= Escalation archetype =

The escalation archetype is one of possible types of system behaviour that are known as system archetypes.

The escalation archetype is common for situations of non-cooperative games where each player can make own decisions and these decisions lead to the outcome for the player. However, when both players try to maximize their output (at the expense of the other one) they can get into a loop where each player will try harder and harder to surpass the opponent. While it can have favourable consequences it can also lead to self-destructive behaviour.

== Structure ==
=== Elements of archetype ===
Escalation archetype system can be described using causal loop diagrams which may consist of balancing and reinforcing loops.

==== Balancing loop ====
Balancing loop is a structure representing negative feedback process. In such a structure, a change in system leads to actions that usually eliminate the effect of that change which means that the system tends to remain stable in time.

==== Reinforcing loop ====
Balancing loop is a structure representing positive feedback process. This reinforcing feedback causes that even a small change in the system can lead to huge disturbances, e.g. variable A is increased which leads to an increase of variable B which leads to another increase of A and so there might be an exponential growth over time.

=== Escalation archetype as balancing loops ===
The image below shows escalation archetype as two balancing loops. When X makes an action, it leads to a change in results of X relative to results of Y. Y then makes action to equalize the situation and the result again changes the balance and induces another action by X. As this repeats actions done by X and Y are bigger and bigger to keep up with other's actions and results.

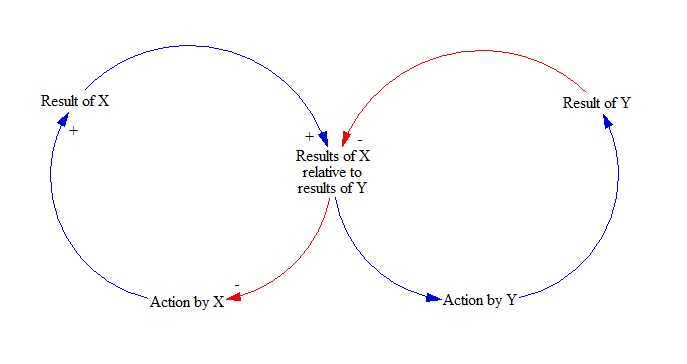
Escalation archetype as two balancing loops displayed as causal loop diagram

=== Escalation archetype as reinforcing loop ===
The causal loop diagram below shows escalation archetype as a single reinforcing loop. It can be read simply as that more action done by X creates bigger results of action done by X. The bigger results of X, the bigger difference between X and Y results. The bigger difference means more action by Y and more action by Y leads to bigger result of Y. The bigger result of Y leads to a smaller difference between X and Y, but the smaller is this difference, the bigger will be the action of X and it starts all over again.

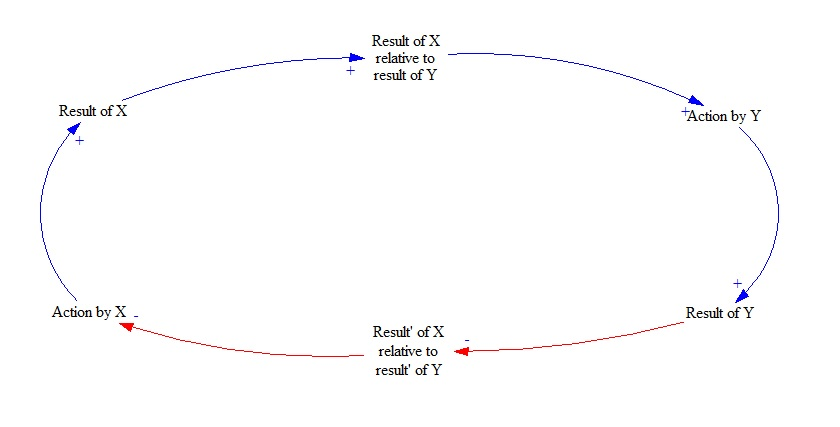
Escalation archetype as one reinforcing loop displayed as causal loop diagram

The image below simplifies reinforcing loop and shows general idea of what happens. Increased activity of X leads to an increase of threat for Y which leads to an increased activity by Y. Increased activity by Y leads to increased threat for X which creates another potential for activity of X to grow.

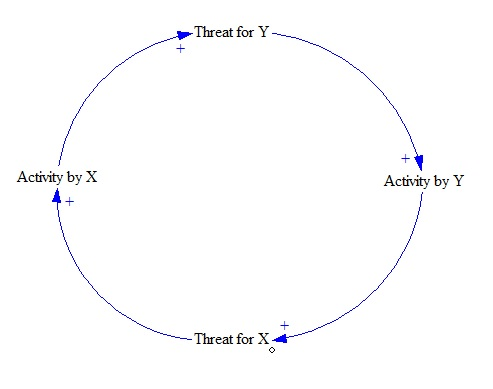
Escalation archetype simplified as one simple reinforcing loop displayed as causal loop diagram

== Examples ==
=== Arms race ===
A well known example of escalation archetype is the arms race. The idea is that in the arms race two (or more) parties are competing to have the strongest army and weapons. An example is the race in producing nuclear weapons by the United States and the Soviet Union that was an important factor in the Cold War. Over the time, each party can get temporarily a slight advantage, but then the other one produces or obtains in other way more weapons and gets the advantage on its side, temporarily. In the end, both parties have great military power that is very threatening not only to them but also to non-aligned parties.

=== Picking apples in an orchard ===
The escalation archetype can turn up in situations such as picking fruit in an orchard. Imagine a large apple orchard with a bountiful crop. An owner of such a plantation cannot pick the whole harvest himself because there are simply too many trees. Therefore, he employs fruit pickers to do the work for him. He tries to figure a way to measure the work they do so that he can reward them fairly. As he is suspicious that workers would might slowly, he is hesitant to link the wage only to hours worked, and he comes up with an idea. He divides workers into two groups and declares that the group which harvests more apples will get a bonus, in addition to their regular wage.

Both groups start harvesting apples with passion and energy. First, group X collects a pallet load a little bit sooner than the second group, Y. Therefore, the Y-group motivates those members who were a little bit slower to increase their pace. Now Y is a little bit better, so they not only catch up, but even finish the second pallet load before the X-group. Then X comes with an idea that they should assign roles to their members – some will pick apples from the upper part of trees using ladders, while some will collect those that are in the lower part of the trees; other will load boxes, and one person will organise the work and help where necessary. This advantage enables X-group to again get ahead of Y. While Y adapts to the model of X, they make some modifications to their procedures, and soon they are the leading group. This improvement of processes continues in several iterations until both parties are exceptionally effective in harvesting apples. The owner can be satisfied with the situation, as pallets are quickly being loaded with apples. Should everything continue this way, the orchard could be harvested in few hours, with X-group beating Y-group by a tenth of a percent. The owner could reward only the winning team or reward both teams, because they were almost equally hard-working.

However, due to the fact that one group was always a little bit behind, the situation in the middle of day is bad for one of the groups, who are slightly slower, let's say it is Y-group. They can continue working at the same rate, and they would finish second, with a loss of a tenth of a percent. Or, they can come up with another innovation, which would enable them to increase their production output. They have an idea that harvesting the topmost apples is slower that harvesting the rest of them. Because of that, they decide to skip these apples and only collect the others. This way, the situation has escalated problematically. While Y could win the competition now, there will be a considerable quantity of apples left on the trees. Or, if both groups are instructed not to leave a single apple in the orchard, they will have to stay much longer to finish these apples, and the owner will have higher costs for their wages.

The owner could, of course, set a condition that no team could leave a tree until it is fully harvested. That would help in some way to break the escalation archetype, unless workers realize they are not punished for some other undesirable behaviour, for example being careless regarding tree condition after the harvest.

As can be seen in this example, the escalation archetype might bring positive results (faster harvesting) but it is necessary to monitor behaviour of the affected system to ensure long-term profitability.

=== The attention fight ===
To avoid naming in this example of escalation archetype occurrence, behaviour of imaginary persons Amy (A), Betty (B), Cecil (C) and Daniel (D)is described.

Amy, Betty, Cecil and Daniel want to become famous celebrities with a lot of money, hordes of admirers and amazing children. They already have many friends and everybody in the town knows each one of them. They all work hard to be best in their field of expertise and soon they are known to the whole country. They know of each other and try to work harder to become more famous than each other. This is when an escalation archetype comes into play. They become the most famous celebrities in the country, and each one of them realizes that to draw more attention than others they need to be unique and very special. As A starts to work even harder than before, B notices that A's fame is growing more than hers and starts to work harder than A. This is noted by C and he does what must be done - starts working more than anyone else. But there is also D, whose ambitions are no smaller; he wants to be the most famous celebrity, so he starts working even harder than anyone else. As A notices her effort is not sufficient, she does what is obvious - starts to work more than before.

Now, this cycle could repeat continuously until Amy, Betty, Cecil or Daniel dies of exhaustion. In the meantime, some of them could start taking drugs with the presumption that it could boost their productivity and ability to concentrate, or with the aim to get rid of depression from working all the time. Another solution presumed by them as feasible would be some way of eliminating their opponents - by false accusation or by pointing out their faults.

Or, if they found it impossible to be better by simply working more, they could try to figure out some way to attract attention by qualitative change instead of merely quantitative change. This way, A could say something shocking on TV; B could simply follow by saying something even more shocking or controversial. Then, C would feel threatened and so he will come up with an idea that he could make controversial photographs. Then D will try to surpass everyone and will do some action that will attract the attention of the media and the public. They would escalate this to an extreme situation.

While, at the beginning, the competitiveness was beneficial for Amy, Betty, Cecil, Daniel and the public, in the long term, many negative consequences result.

What could be a meaningful solution for these people? They could have set some limits for themselves beforehand, for example, how much time they are willing to work to achieve their desire to be a famous celebrity and what is acceptable behaviour and what is not. If they are not able to do so, there has to be some mechanism from outside to stop them - e.g., family or friends giving them cautionary advice.

=== Competing children ===
Tendency of parents to compare their children creates nourishing environment for escalation archetype. Parents tend to compare their kids with other children and among own kids. This creates pressure on children as they are expected to perform well.

Imagine a family with two kids named, for example, Lisa and Bartolomeo. Their parents are very much children-focused and hope their kids will get proper educations and live what they consider successful lives. They invest significant portions of both their family budget and time into both children and hope that this investment will pay off in the form of Lisa and Bartolomeo being successful in school and later in life.

Lisa and Bartolomeo are usual children with some hobbies who study diligently but without extreme passion. They simply do what they got to do. Their results are good but not perfect. So their parents come and start the escalation archetype by telling the kids that the one with better marks will go on special holiday of their choice. As both Lisa and Bartolomeo like travelling a lot, they start to study hard. To satisfaction of their parents children's marks get soon better which is very positive outcome. Yet a problem arises. As they both study really hard to keep pace with the other one, something might go wrong.

For example, when Bartolomeo is very creative and skillful painter but not so talented in studying usual subjects like math or languages. Sooner or later he will reach his limits. Then to keep up the good marks he will have to abandon his painting hobby and his talent will be wasted. Or he will try to sustain great marks and then Bartolomeo will start cheating during exams.

However even when no negative effect happens there will be a difficulty how to reward children after Bartolome finishes second very closely. Should their parents appreciate only Lisa's effort or acknowledge also Bartolomeo's achievements. When they reward only Lisa, Bartolomeo could easily become demotivated and then it would be impossible to make use of positive effects of escalation archetype. On the other hand, rewarding both could mean the same and for both children as they realise that their extra effort does not have necessarily mean better outcome.

There is also an alternative version of how competition amongst children can be affected by escalation archetype. When all parents motivate children to improve in comparison to their peers, they will all study harder and harder while the differences amongst participating kids will remain relatively stable (and if teachers increase requirements they will even retain their marks). Under such simple circumstances most children might benefit from the competition nevertheless children with weaker intellectual skill may become isolated when they are no longer able to pursue others. Reversely in another alternative scenario where all children are demotivated to study for some reason, their results are worse and worse (and if teachers decrease requirements they will retain their marks while being less educated) and downward spiral is working in a way that situation gets worse and worse.

== Risks and opportunities ==
The dangers of systems with escalation archetypes are various. First, it might be difficult to identify the existence of archetype at the first sight. Then the behaviour of the system might look desirable at first and therefore requiring no immediate action. Another risk is a possibility of exponential growth within such structure. Finally the system might have different outcome in short term and long term.

Escalation archetype comes with a possibility to make a big change in the system with a little input or a small action done at the beginning (due to the fact that it behaves like reinforcing loop).

== Solution and optimization ==
To remove downward or upward spiral effect of escalation archetype there is a change in the system necessary which breaks the ongoing pattern. That change is typically switching the actors from non-cooperative game mode to cooperative game behaviour so that they stop escalating their actions to keep with others and rather find mutual solution and movement.

== See also ==
- Attractiveness principle
- Fixes that fail
- Growth and underinvestment
- Limits to growth
