= Reactive destocking =

Reactive destocking in supply chain management is a reduction of the inventory when expected demand goes down. When a company is only doing reactive destocking, the desired inventory to sales ratio, remains unchanged. Reactive destocking in general is done by operational managers of the logistical activities, without additional instructions. The inventory can include finished products, raw materials and/or goods in process.

The term "reactive destocking" is relevant when it is used in connection with active destocking. Active destocking refers to an active decision to reduce the inventory to sales ratio of a company. In general, active destocking is done following an autonomous, often financial decision by a company to improve its efficiency, freeing up cash and reducing its costs. Decisions for active destocking in general are made by financial executives or general managers.

The terms "reactive de-stocking" and "active de-stocking" were first used in an article about the Lehman wave, published by Dutch researchers in 2009.

A Lehman wave refers to an economy-wide fluctuation in production and in economic activity with a wavelength of between 12 and 18 months, driven by a sudden major disruption of the economic system. The Lehman Wave is a dampened, wave-like fluctuation around equilibrium. The amplitude of the Lehman wave is larger for a business that is further away from its end market than for a business that is closer to its end market, which difference is caused by cumulative destocking of the intermediate supply chain.

The first described Lehman wave was caused by global active destocking, followed by reactive destocking after the financial panic following the bankruptcy of Lehman Brothers on September 15, 2008. The Lehman Wave can have strong effects on the sales volume and therefore on the profitability of companies higher in the value chain.

== Effect on the Lehman wave ==
Active destocking caused the Lehman wave and reactive destocking deepened it. The strong dip in the manufacturing industry seen at the end of 2008 was caused by cumulative and synchronized active destocking followed by reactive destocking, triggered by the bankruptcy of Lehman Brothers. Said bankruptcy created a sudden peak in the Libor interest rate, causing the banks to recall credit and companies to start freeing up cash by active destocking, so reducing their stocks. When the customers of a company start active destocking it is experienced by said company as lower demand and said company will respond by doing reactive destocking. End markets also responded by going down, but slower and in most markets not so strongly. The drop in end market plus the active and reactive destocking created a giant damped wave, the so-called Lehman wave.

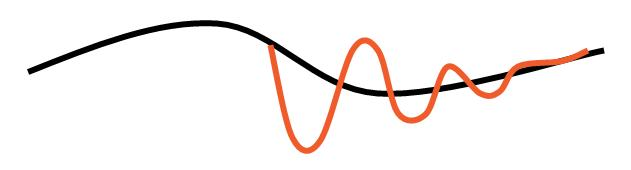
Fig 1: Red curve is the Lehman Wave as a fluctuation around the equilibrium, in this simplified example the black line represents the longer term economic cycle.

== Relation between inventory to sales ratio and inventory following active destocking ==
When a company takes an active destocking decision, said company expresses the wish to reduce the inventory to sales ratio. In a real world, the actual inventory can first go up, before going down, depending on the behavior of the other players in the supply chain.

== Active and reactive destocking ==
Active and reactive destocking explains why some companies can see a strong dip in sales while their end markets are fairly stable. If the supply chain between a company and its end-customer would have a stock depth of "250 days' sales", meaning that it takes at least 250 days for a molecule to travel from a companies' warehouse to the end consumer, and if each firm in such a 250-day supply chain decides to do active destocking of 12%, an amount of stock equal to 30 days’ sales (a whole month) is taken out of the chain. For a company at the beginning of the supply chain this will result in either a business standstill for a whole month or a 33% decline during three months. This discovery of active destocking, reactive destocking and the Lehman Wave can have important implications for manufacturing scheduling, inventory management, work force management and budgeting.

== Relation with active destocking, the Lehman wave and bullwhip effect ==
While the existence of the bullwhip effect has been extensively documented (e.g., Forrester (1961), Sterman (1989), and Lee et al. (1997), Croson and Donohue (2006)), there have been arguments about its existence in the overall economy or in supply chains encompassing numerous companies. Cachon et al. (2007) recently argued that no evidence of the existence of the bullwhip effect could be found. Fransoo and Wouters (2000) and Chen and Lee (2009) argue that in order to observe the bullwhip effect it is crucial to measure it correctly. Both these papers argue that improper aggregation essentially takes away the opportunity to observe the bullwhip effect. In the beer distribution game (Sterman, 1989), the bullwhip effect is created by a single pulse. In Sterman's experiment, this single pulse is an increase in the demand level. In the case of the Lehman wave that started in September 2008 the single pulse is active destocking, in this case a synchronized decrease in the target inventory-over-sales level along the entire supply chain. A reduction of inventories under stable or slightly decreasing sales can only be achieved if purchases are reduced or postponed. As a consequence of the decision to reduce inventory, therefore, many companies substantially reduced their purchases of supplies or raw materials. Obviously, companies further upstream in the supply chain were hit more than companies downstream. Therefore, the Lehman wave can be described as a synchronized bullwhip caused by active destocking, followed by reactive destocking.
