= Active destocking =

Active destocking in supply chain management is an active decision to reduce the inventory-to-sales ratio of a company. The inventory can include finished products, raw materials and goods in process. In general, active destocking is done following an autonomous, often financial decision by a company to improve its efficiency, free up cash and reduce its costs. Decisions for active destocking in general are made by financial executives or general managers.

Active destocking should be distinguished from reactive destocking. Reactive destocking is a reduction of the inventory when expected demand goes down. When a company is only doing reactive destocking the inventory-to-sales ratio remains unchanged. Reactive destocking in general is done by the operational managers of the logistical activities, without additional instructions.

The terms active destocking and reactive destocking were first used in an article about the Lehman Wave, published by Dutch researchers in 2009.

A Lehman wave refers to an economy-wide fluctuation in production and in economic activity with a wavelength of between 12 and 18 months, driven by a sudden major disruption of the economic system. The Lehman wave is a dampened, wave-like fluctuation around equilibrium. The amplitude of the Lehman wave is larger for a business that is further away from its end market than for a business that is closer to its end market, which difference is caused by cumulative destocking of the intermediate supply chain.

The first described Lehman wave was caused by global active destocking and reactive destocking after the financial panic following the bankruptcy of Lehman Brothers on September 15, 2008. The Lehman wave can have strong effects on the sales volume and therefore on the profitability of companies higher in the value chain.

== As cause of the Lehman wave ==
The strong dip in the manufacturing industry seen at the end of 2008 was caused by cumulative and synchronized active destocking followed by reactive destocking, triggered by the bankruptcy of Lehman Brothers. Said bankruptcy created a sudden peak in the Libor interest rate, causing the banks to recall credit and companies to start freeing up cash by active destocking, so reducing their stocks. When the customers of a company start active destocking it is experienced by said company as lower demand and said company will respond by doing reactive destocking. End markets also responded by going down, but slower and in most markets not so strongly. The drop in end market plus the active and reactive destocking created a damped wave with a large amplitude, the so-called Lehman wave.

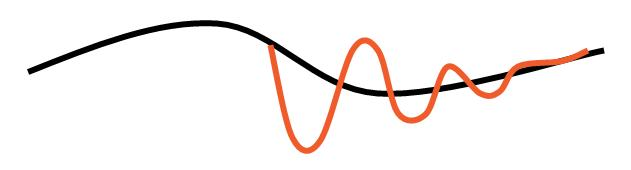
The red curve is the Lehman wave as a fluctuation around the equilibrium, in this simplified example the black line represents the longer term economic cycle.

== Relation between inventory to sales ratio and inventory ==
When a company takes an active destocking decision, said company expresses the wish to reduce the inventory-to-sales ratio. In practice, the actual inventory can go up before going down, depending on the behavior of the other firms in the supply chain.

== Effect on sales ==
Active destocking explains why some companies can see a strong dip in sales while their end markets are fairly stable. If the supply chain between a company and its end-customer would have a stock depth of "250 days' sales", meaning that it takes at least 250 days for a molecule to travel from a company's warehouse to the final consumer, and if each firm in such a 250-day supply chain decides to do active destocking of 12%, an amount of stock equal to 30 days' sales (a whole month) is taken out of the chain. For a company at the beginning of the supply chain this will result in either a business standstill for a whole month or a 33% decline during three months. This discovery of active destocking and the Lehman wave can have important implications for manufacturing scheduling, inventory management, work force management and budgeting.

== Relation with the Lehman wave and bullwhip effect ==
While the existence of the bullwhip effect has been extensively documented (e.g., Forrester (1961), Sterman (1989), and Lee et al. (1997), Croson and Donohue (2006)), there have been arguments about its existence in the overall economy or in supply chains encompassing numerous companies. Cachon et al. (2007) recently argued that no evidence of the existence of the bullwhip effect could be found. Fransoo and Wouters (2000) and Chen and Lee (2009) argue that in order to observe the bullwhip effect it is crucial to measure it correctly. Both these papers argue that improper aggregation essentially takes away the opportunity to observe the bullwhip effect. In the beer distribution game (Sterman, 1989), the bullwhip effect is created by a single pulse. In Sterman's experiment, this single pulse is an increase in the demand level. In the case of the Lehman wave that started in September 2008, the single pulse is active destocking, in this case a synchronized decrease in the target inventory-over-sales level along the entire supply chain. A reduction of inventories under stable or slightly decreasing sales can only be achieved if purchases are reduced or postponed. As a consequence of the decision to reduce inventory, therefore, many companies substantially reduced their purchases of supplies or raw materials. Obviously, companies further upstream in the supply chain were hit more than companies downstream. Therefore, the Lehman wave can be described as a synchronized bullwhip caused by active destocking, deepened by reactive destocking.
