= Lehman Wave =

The term Lehman Wave refers to an economy-wide fluctuation in production and economic activity, with a wavelength of between 12 and 18 months, driven by a sudden major disruption of the economic system. The Lehman Wave is a damped, wave-like fluctuation around equilibrium. The amplitude of the Lehman Wave is larger for a business that is further away from its end market than for a business that is closer to its end market, which difference is caused by cumulative de-stocking of the intermediate supply chain. This term Lehman Wave has first been used by Dutch researchers in 2009 who gave that name to the economic wave that started in September 2008. They argue that the latter was caused by global de-stocking after the financial panic following the bankruptcy of Lehman Brothers on September 15, 2008. The Lehman Wave can have strong effects on the sales volume and therefore on the profitability of companies that are located upstream in the supply chain.

== Mechanism ==
The strong dip in the manufacturing industry seen at the end of 2008 was caused by cumulative and synchronized active destocking, triggered by the bankruptcy of Lehman Brothers. Said bankruptcy created a sudden peak in the Libor interest rate, causing banks to recall credit and companies to start freeing up cash by reducing ownership in company shares. End markets also responded by going down, but much slower and in most markets not so strongly. The de-stocking created a giant damped wave, the so-called "Lehman wave".

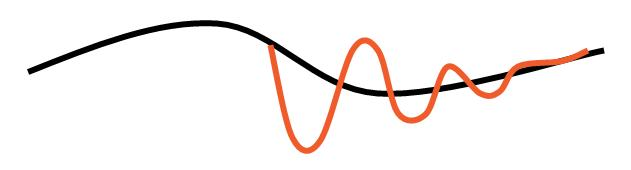
Fig 1: Red curve is the Lehman Wave as a fluctuation around the equilibrium, in this simplified example the black line represents the longer term economic cycle.

== Compared with other business cycles ==
The cyclic pattern of the Lehman Wave can be modelled explicitly since it is the consequence of mechanical behavior of stocks and flows. The Lehman Wave is presumed to have a wave-like character because of the elasticity of the supply chains in which it takes place. Each individual supply chain acts as a string that is oscillating. All supply chains together form the economy, which also oscillates. The wave character of the Lehman Wave makes it possible to predict its cause.

== Active and re-active destocking ==
Active and re-active destocking explains why some companies can see a strong dip in sales while their end markets are fairly stable. If the supply chain between a company and its end-customer would have a stock depth of "250 days' sales", meaning that it takes at least 250 days for a molecule to travel from a companies' warehouse to the end consumer, and if each firm in such a 250-day supply chain decides to do active destocking of 12%, an amount of stock equal to 30 days' sales (a whole month) is taken out of the chain. For a company at the beginning of the supply chain this will result in either a business standstill for a whole month or a 33% decline during three months. This discovery of active destocking, reactive destocking and the Lehman Wave can have important implications for manufacturing scheduling, inventory management, work force management and budgeting.

== Relation to the bullwhip effect ==
While the existence of the bullwhip effect has been extensively documented (e.g., Forrester (1961), Sterman (1989), and Lee et al. (1997)) Croson and Donohue (2006), there have been arguments about its existence in the overall economy or in supply chains encompassing numerous companies. Cachon et al. (2007) recently argued that no evidence of the existence of the bullwhip effect could be found. Fransoo and Wouters (2000) and Chen and Lee (2009) argue that in order to observe the bullwhip effect it is crucial to measure it correctly. Both these papers argue that improper aggregation essentially takes away the opportunity to observe the bullwhip effect. In the beer distribution game (Sterman, 1989), the bullwhip effect is created by a single pulse. In Sterman's experiment, this single pulse is an increase in the demand level. In the case of the Lehman Wave that started in September 2008 the single pulse is a synchronized decrease in the target inventory level along the entire supply chain. A reduction of inventories under stable or slightly decreasing sales can only be achieved if purchases are reduced or postponed. As a consequence of the decision to reduce inventory, therefore, many companies substantially reduced their purchases of supplies or raw materials. Obviously, companies further upstream in the supply chain were hit more than companies downstream. So the Lehman Wave can be described as a synchronized bullwhip.

== Relationship with debates in economics ==
In economics, there has been an ongoing debate whether inventory smooths production or whether it act as an accelerator of business cycles. Feldstein and Auerbach (1976) note that "rarely [does] a study of inventory behavior fail[s] to note that some 75 percent of the cyclical downturn in gross national product from peak to trough can be accounted for by the reduction of business inventories". Theoretical explanations of the inventory accelerator effect list aspects of the Lehman Wave phenomenon, such as delay in adjusting forecasts, but do not capture the essential layered structure of the supply chain. The latter is a novelty in the reasoning behind the Lehman Wave theory.
