= System archetype =

Patterns of behavior of a system

A system archetype is a pattern of behavior of a system. Systems expressed by circles of causality have therefore similar structure. Identifying a system archetype and finding the leverage enables efficient changes in a system. The basic system archetypes and possible solutions of the problems are mentioned in the Examples section. A fundamental property of nature is that no cause can affect the past. System archetypes do not imply that current causes affect past effects.

== Causality ==
The basic idea of system thinking is that every action triggers a reaction. In system dynamics this reaction is called feedback. There are two types of feedback – reinforcing feedback and balancing feedback. Sometimes a feedback (or a reaction) does not occur immediately – the process contains delays. Any system can be drawn as a diagram set up with circles of causality – including actions, feedbacks and delays.

Reinforcing feedback (or amplifying feedback) accelerates the given trend of a process. If the trend is ascending, the reinforcing (positive) feedback will accelerate the growth. If the trend is descending, it will accelerate the decline. Falling of an avalanche is an example of the reinforcing feedback process.

Balancing feedback (or stabilizing feedback) will work if any goal-state exists. Balancing process intends to reduce a gap between a current state and a desired state. The balancing (negative) feedback adjusts a present state to a desirable target regardless whether the trend is descending or ascending. An example of the balancing feedback process is staying upright on bicycle (when riding).

Delays in systems cause people to perceive a response to an action incorrectly. This causes an under- or overestimation of the needed action and results in oscillation, instability or even breakdown.

== Examples ==
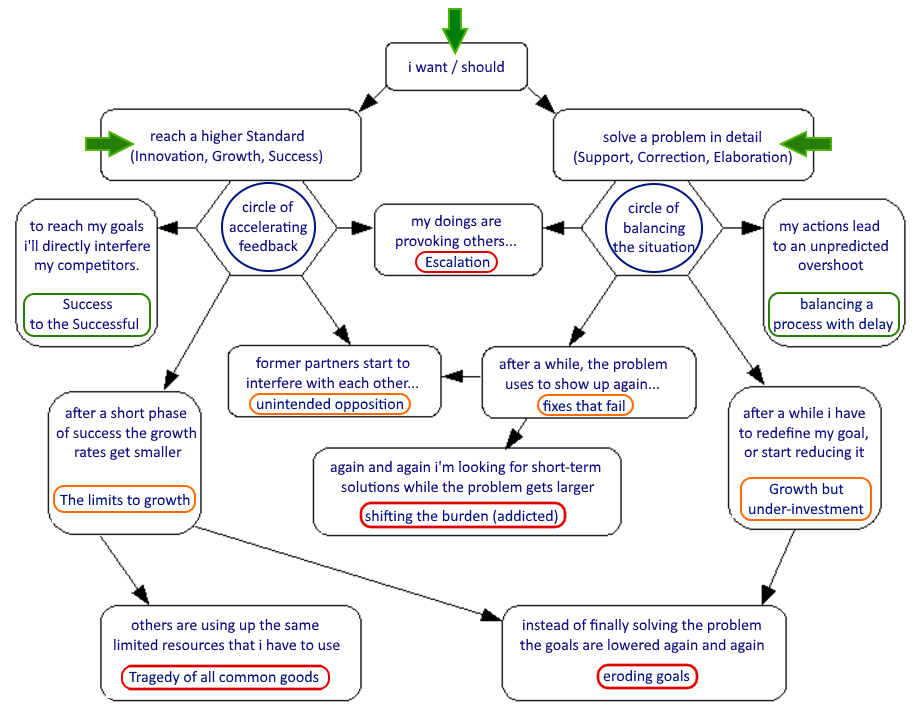
Overview of common System Dynamics Archetypes

The following System Archetypes describe the most common generic structures. Before effectively addressing a specific situation, the underlying pattern must be identified. The following Flow Diagram should help identifying these archetypes. The links between the different archetypes are an indicator of most common connections. Keep in mind that in every situation, there may be more possible ways to follow, though. Consider that everyone is located somewhere in the flow, and that every possible situation has its own advantages, down-sides, caveats, and options. Nevertheless, correctly identifying and understanding your situation is always the first step of solving your problem in a sustainable way.

=== Balancing process with delay ===
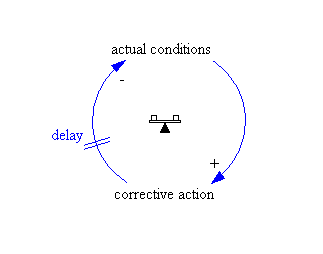
Balancing process with delay

This archetype explains the system in which the response to action is delayed. If the agents do not perceive the delayed feedback, they might overshoot or underestimate the requisite action in order to reach their goals. This could be avoided by being patient or by accelerating reactions of the system to realized measures.

Example: supply chain (The Beer Game)

=== Limits to growth ===
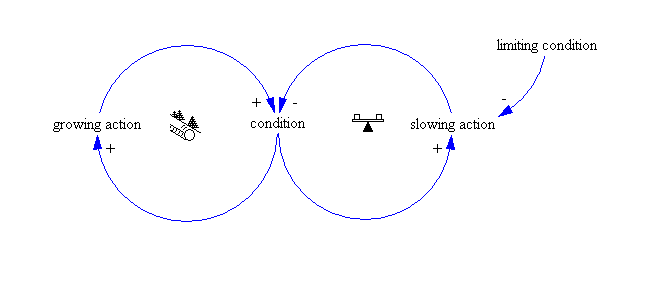
Limits to growth

The unprecedented growth is produced by a reinforcing feedback process until the system reaches its peak. The halt of this growth is caused by limits inside or outside of the system. However, if the limits are not properly recognized; the former methods are continuously applied, but more and more aggressively. This results in the contrary of the desired state – a decrease of the system. The solution lies in the weakening or elimination of the cause of limitation.

Example: dieting, learning foreign languages

The Attractiveness Principle is an archetype derived from Limits to Growth. The main difference is that Attractiveness Principle assumes growth is limited with two or more factors.

=== Shifting the burden ===
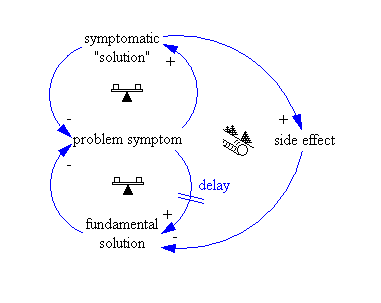
Shifting the burden

The problem is handled by a simple solution with immediate effect, thereby "healing the symptoms". The primary source of the problem is overlooked, because its remedy is demanding and has no immediate outcome. The origin of the problem should be identified and solved in the long-term run during which the addiction to the symptomatic remedy decreases.

Example: drug addiction, paying debts by borrowing

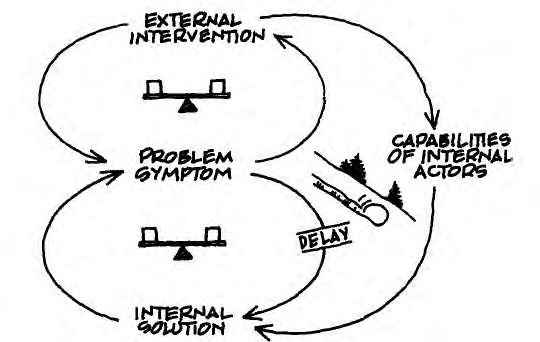
Shifting the burden to the intervenor

A special case of the “Shifting the Burden” systems archetype that occurs when an intervenor is brought in to help solve an ongoing problem. Over time, as the intervenor successfully handles the problem, the people within the system become less capable of solving the problem themselves. They become even more dependent on the intervenor. Examples: ongoing use of outside consultants.

In simple terms, this is an archetype whereby a system grows increasingly dependent on an outside intervenor to help it function. In the short-term this works, but in the long term the system is unable to function on its own due to the dependence on the intervention and eventually fails to perform.

=== Eroding goals ===
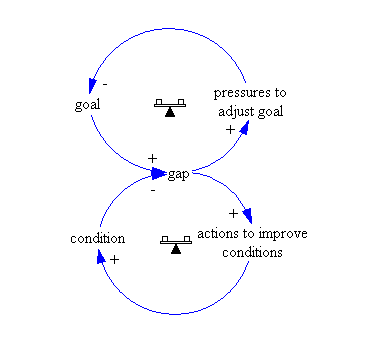
Eroding goals

A kind of drift to low performance archetype.

Example: balancing the public debt, sliding limits of environmental pollution

=== Escalation ===
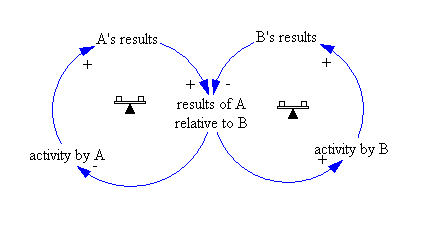
Escalation

The escalation archetype could be seen as a non-cooperative game where both players suppose that just one of them can win. They are responding to actions of the other player in order to “defend themselves”. The aggression grows and can result in self-destructive behavior. The vicious circle can be broken by one agent stopping to react defensively and turn the game into cooperative one. Or by stopping to react to the other, or very slightly.

Example: arms race

=== Success to successful ===
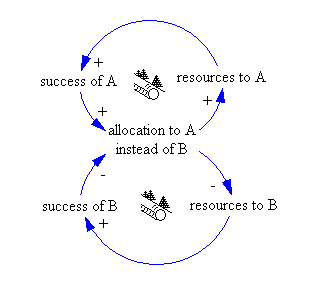
Success to the successful

Two people or activities need the same limited resources. As one of them becomes more successful, more resources are assigned to him/it. The second one becomes less and less successful due to lacking resources, and “prove the right decision” to support the first one. This is a form of preferential attachment.

Problems occur if the competition is unhealthy and interferes with the goals of the whole system. The two activities or agents might be decoupled or they should receive balanced amount of resources.

Examples: two products of one company, work vs. family

=== Tragedy of the commons ===
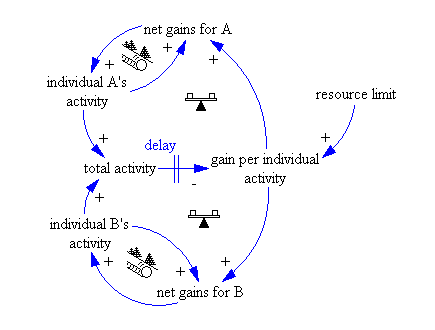
Tragedy of the commons

Agents use common limited resource to profit individually. As the use of the resource is not controlled, the agents would like to continuously raise their benefits. The resource is therefore used more and more and the revenues of the agents are decreasing. The agents are intensifying their exploitation until the resource is completely used up or seriously damaged: this is the tragedy of the commons.

To protect common resources some form of regulation should be introduced.

Example: fish stocks (The Fishing Game)

=== Fixes that fail ===
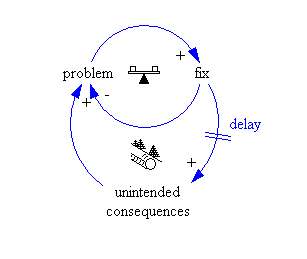
Fixes that fail

In the fixes that fail archetype, the problem is solved by some fix (a specific solution) with immediate positive effect. Nonetheless, the “side effects” of this solution turn out in the future. The best remedy seems to apply the same solution.

Example: saving costs on maintenance, paying interest by other loans (with other interests)

=== Growth and underinvestment ===
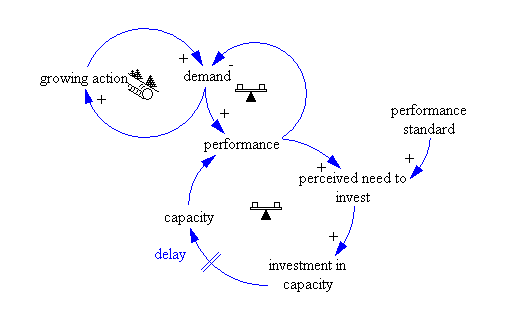
Growth and underinvestment

The limit to growth is the current production capacity. It can be removed by sufficient investment in new capacities. If the investment is not aggressive enough (or it is too low), the capacities are overloaded, the quality of services declines and the demand decreases. This archetype is especially important in capacity planning.

Example: small, but growing company.

== See also ==
- The Fifth Discipline
- System Dynamics
- Organizational learning
- Limits to Growth
- Accidental Adversaries
