= Attractiveness principle =

Systems dynamics archetype

The Attractiveness Principle is an archetype in system dynamics. System archetypes describe common patterns of behavior in dynamic complex systems. The attractiveness principle is a variation of the Limits to Growth (LtG) archetype, with restrictions caused by multiple limits. The limiting factors here are each of different character and usually cannot be dealt with the same way and/or (and very likely) they cannot be all addressed.

The term attractiveness principle was first used by inventor of system dynamics Jay W. Forrester. According to Forrester, the only way to control growth is to control attractiveness. Other references on this topic can be found in The Systems Thinker and in The Fifth Discipline Fieldbook in articles and parts by Michael Goodman and Art Kleiner.

== In business ==
In business, the attractiveness principle incorporates the concept that any product or kind of business cannot ever be “all things to all people” though companies very often strive to follow this way. One needs to make necessary decisions on the characteristics of the product as it cannot be perfect in all dimensions. If they do not, the product is not going to be successful as of the natural constraints (limited resources) it will have to face – sooner or later. It is a fact of life that (assuming we know the relationships among the system's elements) we can influence, inhibit or remove some of these limits through making expert changes in the system. The archetype can help us to get the insight into the system behavior so we could identify and decide which limiting factors to inhibit before they inhibit the results we want to achieve. But there will always be some limits we are not able to reduce and simply “we have to learn to live with them” and make compromises between our goals.

=== In management ===
Knowledge of the attractiveness principle system archetype is essential in management of various projects and businesses. Managers decide which problem is more attractive in terms of possible future improvement of the company – the origin of the archetype's name actually came from this point. Manager as a decision-maker needs efficient support in solving such complex problems, and system dynamics can play this role. Its main advantage is the ability to reach higher complexity and to provide simultaneous calculations. These can be used to determine the future possible behavior of the system. If managers are able to recognize the archetype in a problem it often helps them to solve it with less cost and they are also often able to change its structure.

== System dynamics model ==
=== Structure ===
Figure 1. Causal loop diagram

Figure 2. Stock and flow diagram

The system is made up of a reinforcing loop and at least two balancing loops. See causal loop diagram and stock and flow diagram for the insight into model fundamentals.

The reinforcing loop (R1 in figure 1 and 2) represents accelerating growth – a growing action is producing results. This is a positive feedback loop – the more the growing action taken, the higher the results level, and yet the result itself produces even more of growing action. Balancing loops (B2 and B3 in Figure 1 and 2) represent the way the system turns back to its original state. Result produced in the reinforcing loop is influenced within the balancing loop. There are (at least) two limits causing the slowing actions in the system and adding to them. Limiting actions start to influence the system at various levels of results, generally. Since that moment slowing actions act in the system simultaneously. Both the slowing actions contribute to the total slowing action. Total slowing action then inhibits the results (this process is delayed in time). If we get back to the reinforcing loop then we can see the inhibited results are reducing growing action which is leading to the reduced results again.

=== Trade-offs ===
Trade-offs must be calculated to decide which ones of limits to focus on and address first. The one that is more attractive in terms of future benefit to the results should be chosen to be dealt with. It is necessary to compare the future situations after removing each of the slowing actions and their values in terms of reaching the desired result. But not only the one that will have a greater impact should be chosen but a possible synergetic effect when removing interdependent limits should be considered when making a decision.

=== Simulation ===
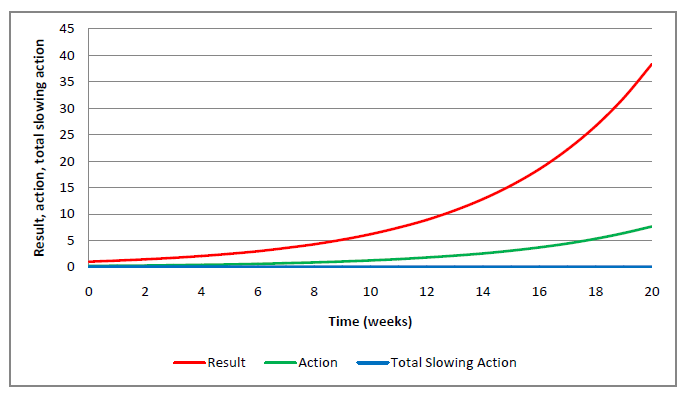
Figure 3. Situation with no limiting factor.

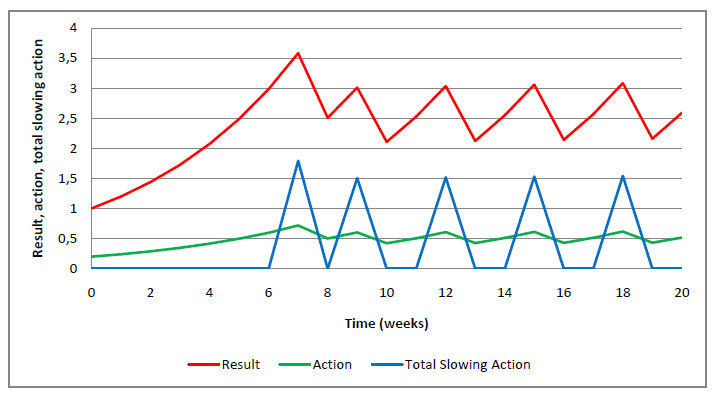
Figure 4. Situation with one limiting factor set at 3 and another one set at 5.

The Simgua Attractiveness principle model can be used to model systems behavior. Graphs in Figure 3 and 4 show the results of simulation in Simgua simulation tool.

== Examples ==
=== Project management ===
There is a project with a negative impact of a risk. Some people were taken off the team, there are unexpected changes in the project content and the economic circumstances have changed, too. The indicators of its quality, schedule and costs need to be kept up. Management's task is to allocate the resources as well as possible in terms of the project's indicators. Due to the fact the resources are limited it is necessary to make tradeoffs among opportunities.

=== Attractiveness of geographical areas ===
Jay W. Forrester studied the attractiveness principle of geographical areas. He states that all the places in the world tend to the equilibrium where they are all equally attractive, no matter the population class. Let attractivity be the overall rating of a city in terms of its desirability for potential inhabitants. If a city has high attractivity people move to this city, which increases the prices of housing which is getting scarce, cause overloading of job opportunities (leading to unemployment), the environmental stress is rising, city getting overcrowded etc. These changes demonstrate the impact of the movement as of an equalizing process which makes the mentioned city less and less attractive – to the (idealized) point when no one wants to move to it anymore. We can illustrate this situation by Forester's words:

To illustrate the attractiveness principle, imagine for a moment the ideal city. Perhaps the ideal city would be one with readily available housing at low cost, a surplus of jobs at high wages, excellent schools, no smoke or pollution, housing located near one's place of work, no crime, beautiful parks, cultural opportunities, and to this list the reader can add his own preferences. Suppose such a city existed. What would happen? It would be perceived as the ideal place to live. People from everywhere would move into the ideal city until the advantages had been so swamped by rising population that the city would offer no net attractiveness compared with other locations. (, pg. 275-276)

As stated by Richard C. Duncan, using Forrester's Word dynamics model to predict the behavior of Third World countries shows that it is not possible to stop the immigration from these countries to USA as these countries can never reach the USA's level of geographical attractiveness (and so there always will be a tendency to immigrate).

== Effective strategies ==
Here is a list of possible effective strategies to deal with attractiveness principle in praxis based on.

1. Knowing the growth is limited is the first step.
2. The insight is complicated by mutual interaction of limits, so analysis of their relation should be a priority. Such an analysis can also reveal possible synergies that can be achieved by allocating resources to carefully chosen limits.
3. Consider replacing limited resources by another ones.
4. Dominant strategy is to monitor the limits and using tradeoff analysis for deciding which of them it is convenient to reduce or remove to obtain desired results.
5. Define the acceptable level of (un)attraction.
6. Slowing actions are not usually appearing at the same time so it is important to manage them through the time.
7. Try to inhibit the limits before they even start to act like limits.
8. As limits start to have impact on various levels of results it is important to keep the right timing – intercept the moment when the limit starts playing its role but not waste the resources to avoid its impact unless it is necessary.

It is important to have in mind that dynamic complexity is very often counterintuitive – cause and effect are distant in time and space, but decision-makers rather tend to look for causes “near” their effects. The solution is not to concentrate on the symptoms of the problem, but on its causes.
