= Plateau principle =

Mathematical model or scientific law

The plateau principle is a mathematical model or scientific law originally developed to explain the time course of drug action (pharmacokinetics). The principle has wide applicability in pharmacology, physiology, nutrition, biochemistry, and system dynamics. It applies whenever a drug or nutrient is infused or ingested at a relatively constant rate and when a constant fraction is eliminated during each time interval. Under these conditions, any change in the rate of infusion leads to an exponential increase or decrease until a new level is achieved. This behavior is also called an approach to steady state because rather than causing an indefinite increase or decrease, a natural balance is achieved when the rate of infusion or production is balanced by the rate of loss.

An especially important use of the plateau principle is to study the renewal of tissue constituents in the human and animal body. In adults, daily synthesis of tissue constituents is nearly constant, and most constituents are removed with a first-order reaction rate. Applicability of the plateau principle was recognized during radioactive tracer studies of protein turnover in the 1940s by Rudolph Schoenheimer and David Rittenberg. Unlike the case with drugs, the initial amount of tissue or tissue protein is not zero because daily synthesis offsets daily elimination. In this case, the model is also said to approach a steady state with exponential or logarithmic kinetics. Constituents that change in this manner are said to have a biological half-life.

A practical application of the plateau principle is that most people have experienced "plateauing" during regimens for weight management or training for sports. After a few weeks of progress, one seems unable to continue gaining in ability or losing weight. This outcome results from the same underlying quantitative model. This entry will describe the popular concepts as well as development of the plateau principle as a scientific, mathematical model.

In the sciences, the broadest application of the plateau principle is creating realistic time signatures for change in kinetic models (see Mathematical model). One example of this principle is the long time required to effectively change human body composition. Theoretical studies have shown that many months of consistent physical training and food restriction are needed to bring about permanent weight stability in people who were previously overweight.

== The plateau principle in pharmacokinetics ==
Most drugs are eliminated from the blood plasma with first-order kinetics. For this reason, when a drug is introduced into the body at a constant rate by intravenous therapy, it approaches a new steady concentration in the blood at a rate defined by its half-life. Similarly, when the intravenous infusion is ended, the drug concentration decreases exponentially and reaches an undetectable level after 5–6 half-lives have passed. If the same drug is administered as a bolus (medicine) with a single injection, peak concentration is achieved almost immediately and then the concentration declines exponentially.

Most drugs are taken by mouth. In this case, the assumption of constant infusion is only approximated as doses are repeated over the course of several days. The plateau principle still applies but more complex models are required to account for the route of administration.

== Equations for the approach to steady state ==
Derivation of equations that describe the time course of change for a system with zero-order input and first-order elimination are presented in the articles Exponential decay and Biological half-life, and in scientific literature.

$$C_t = C_0 e^{-k_e t} \,$$

- C_{t} is concentration after time t
- C_{0} is the initial concentration (t = 0)
- k_{e} is the elimination rate constant

The relationship between the elimination rate constant and half-life is given by the following equation:

$$k_e = \frac{\ln 2}{t_{1/2}}\,$$

Because ln 2 equals 0.693, the half-life is readily calculated from the elimination rate constant. Half-life has units of time, and the elimination rate constant has units of 1/time, e.g., per hour or per day.

An equation can be used to forecast the concentration of a compound at any future time when the fractional degration rate and steady state concentration are known:

$$C_t = C_0 + (C_{ss} - C_0)(1 - e^{-k_e t})\,$$

- C_{ss} is concentration after the steady state has been achieved.

The exponential function in parentheses corresponds to the fraction of total change that has been achieved as time passes and the difference between C_{ss} and C_{0} equals the total amount of change. Finally, at steady state, the concentration is expected to equal the rate of synthesis, production or infusion divided by the first-order elimination constant.

$$C_{ss}= \frac{k_s}{k_e} \,$$

- k_{s} is the rate of synthesis or infusion

Although these equations were derived to assist with predicting the time course of drug action, the same equation can be used for any substance or quantity that is being produced at a measurable rate and degraded with first-order kinetics. Because the equation applies in many instances of mass balance, it has very broad applicability in addition to pharmacokinetics. The most important inference derived from the steady state equation and the equation for fractional change over time is that the elimination rate constant (k_{e}) or the sum of rate constants that apply in a model determine the time course for change in mass when a system is perturbed (either by changing the rate of inflow or production, or by changing the elimination rate(s)).

=== Estimating values for kinetic rate parameters ===
When experimental data are available, the normal procedure for estimating rate parameters such as k_{e} and C_{ss} is to minimize the sum of squares of differences between observed data and values predicted based on initial estimates of the rate constant and steady state value. This can be done using any software package that contains a curve fitting routine. An example of this methodology implemented with spreadsheet software has been reported. The same article reports a method that requires only 3 equally spaced data points to obtain estimates for kinetic parameters. Spreadsheets that compare these methods are available.

== The plateau principle in nutrition ==
Dr. Wilbur O. Atwater, who developed the first database of food composition in the United States, recognized that the response to excessive or insufficient nutrient intake included an adjustment in efficiency that would result in a plateau. He observed: "It has been found by numerous experiments that when the nutrients are fed in large excess, the body may continue for a time to store away part of the extra material, but after it has accumulated a certain amount, it refuses to take on more, and the daily consumption equals the supply even when this involves great waste."

In general, no essential nutrient is produced in the body. Nutrient kinetics therefore follow the plateau principle with the distinction that most are ingested by mouth and the body must contain an amount adequate for health. The plateau principle is important in determining how much time is needed to produce a deficiency when intake is insufficient. Because of this, pharmacokinetic considerations should be part of the information needed to set a dietary reference intake for essential nutrients.

=== Vitamin C ===
The blood plasma concentration of vitamin C or ascorbic acid as a function of dose attains a plateau with a half-life of about 2 weeks. Bioavailability of vitamin C is highest at dosages below 200 mg per day. Above 500 mg, nearly all of excess vitamin C is excreted through urine.

=== Vitamin D ===
Vitamin D metabolism is complex because the provitamin can be formed in the skin by ultraviolet irradiation or obtained from the diet. Once hydroxylated, the vitamin has a half-life of about 2 months. Various studies have suggested that current intakes are inadequate for optimum bone health and much current research is aimed at determining recommendations for obtaining adequate circulating vitamin D_{3} and calcium while also minimizing potential toxicity.

=== Phytochemicals in foods and beverages ===
Many healthful qualities of foods and beverages may be related to the content of phytochemicals (see List of phytochemicals in food). Prime examples are flavonoids found in green tea, berries, defatted cocoa, and spices as well as in the skins and seeds of apples, onions, and grapes.

Investigations into healthful benefits of phytochemicals follow exactly the same principles of pharmacokinetics that are required to study drug therapy. The initial concentration of any non-nutritive phytochemical in the blood plasma is zero unless a person has recently ingested a food or beverage. For example, as increasing amounts of green tea extract are consumed, a graded increase in plasma catechin can be measured, and the major compound is eliminated with a half-life of about 5 hours. Other considerations that must be evaluated include whether the ingested compound interacts favorably or unfavorably with other nutrients or drugs, and whether there is evidence for a threshold or toxicity at higher levels of intake.

== Transitions in body composition ==
=== Plateaus during dieting and weight loss ===
It is especially common for people who are trying to lose weight to experience plateaus after several weeks of successful weight reduction. The plateau principle suggests that this leveling off is a sign of success. Basically, as one loses weight, less food energy is required to maintain the resting metabolic rate, which makes the initial regimen less effective. The idea of weight plateaus has been discussed for subjects who are participating in a calorie restriction experiment Food energy is expended largely through work done against gravity (see Joule), so weight reduction lessens the effectiveness of a given workout. In addition, a trained person has greater skill and therefore greater efficiency during a workout. Remedies include increasing the workout intensity or length and reducing portion sizes of meals more than may have been done initially.

The fact that weight loss and dieting reduce the metabolic rate is supported by research. In one study, heat production was reduced 30% in obese men after a weight loss program, and this led to resistance to further lose body weight. Whether body mass increases or decreases, adjustments in the thermic effect of food, resting energy expenditure, and non-resting energy expenditure all oppose further change.

=== Plateaus during strength training ===
Any athlete who has trained for a sport has probably experienced plateaus, and this has given rise to various strategies to continue improving. Voluntary skeletal muscle is in balance between the amount of muscle synthesized or renewed each day and the amount that is degraded. Muscle fibers respond to repetition and load, and increased training causes the quantity of exercised muscle fiber to increase exponentially (simply meaning that the greatest gains are seen during the first weeks of training). Successful training produces hypertrophy of muscle fibers as an adaptation to the training regimen. In order to make further gains, greater workout intensity is required with heavier loads and more repetitions, although improvement in skill can contribute to gains in ability.

When a bodily constituent adjusts exponentially over time, it usually attains a new stable level as a result of the plateau principle. The new level may be higher than the initial level (hypertrophy) in the case of strength training or lower in the case of dieting or disuse atrophy. This adjustment contributes to homeostasis but does not require feedback regulation. Gradual, asymptotic approach to a new balance between synthesis and degradation produces a stable level. Because of this, the plateau principle is sometimes called the stability principle. Mathematically, the result is linear dynamics despite the fact that most biological processes are non-linear (see Nonlinear system) if considered over a very broad range of inputs.

=== Changes in body composition when food is restricted ===
Data from the Minnesota Starvation Experiment by Ancel Keys and others demonstrate that during food restriction, total body mass, fat mass and lean body mass follow an exponential approach to a new steady state. The observation that body mass changes exponentially during partial or complete starvation seems to be a general feature of adaptation to energy restriction.

== The plateau principle in biochemistry ==
Each cell produces thousands of different kinds of protein and enzymes. One of the key methods of cellular regulation is to change the rate of transcription of messenger RNA, which gives rise to a change in the rate of synthesis for the protein that the messenger RNA encodes. The plateau principle explains why the concentration of different enzymes increases at unique rates in response to a single hormone. Because each enzyme is degraded with at a unique rate (each has a different half-life), the rate of change differs even when the same stimulus is applied. This principle has been demonstrated for the response of liver enzymes that degrade amino acids to cortisone, which is a catabolic hormone.

The method of approach to steady state has also been used to analyze the change in messenger RNA levels when synthesis or degradation changes, and a model has also been reported in which the plateau principle is used to connect the change in messenger RNA synthesis to the expected change in protein synthesis and concentration as a function of time.

== The plateau principle in physiology ==
Excessive gain in body weight contributes to the metabolic syndrome, which may include elevated fasting blood sugar (or glucose), resistance to the action of insulin, elevated low-density lipoprotein (LDL cholesterol) or decreased high-density lipoprotein (HDL cholesterol), and elevated blood pressure. Obesity was designated as a disease in 2013 by the American Medical Association. It is defined as a chronic, relapsing, multi-factorial, neurobehavioral disease, wherein an increase in body fat promotes adipose tissue dysfunction and abnormal fat mass physical forces, resulting in adverse metabolic, biomechanical, and psychosocial health consequences. Because body mass, fat mass and fat free mass all change exponentially during weight reduction, it is a reasonable hypothesis to expect that symptoms of metabolic syndrome will also adjust exponentially towards normal values.

== The plateau principle in compartmental modeling ==
Scientists have evaluated turnover of bodily constituents using radioactive tracers and stable isotope tracers. If given orally, the tracers are absorbed and move into the blood plasma, and are then distributed throughout the bodily tissues. In such studies, a multi-compartment model is required to analyze turnover by isotopic labeling. The isotopic marker is called a tracer and the material being analyzed is the tracee.

In studies with humans, blood plasma is the only tissue that can be easily sampled. A common procedure is to analyze the dynamics by assuming that changes can be attributed to a sum of exponentials. A single mathematical compartment is usually assumed to follow first-order kinetics in accord with the plateau principle. There are many examples of this kind of analysis in nutrition, for example, in the study of metabolism of zinc, and carotenoids.

The commonest assumption in compartmental modeling is that material in a homogeneous compartment behaves exponentially. However, this assumption is sometimes modified to include a saturable response that follows Michaelis–Menten kinetics or a related model called a Hill equation. When the material in question is present at a concentration near the K_{M}, it often behaves with pseudo first-order kinetics (see Rate equation) and the plateau principle applies despite the fact that the model is non-linear.

== The plateau principle in system dynamics ==
Compartmental modeling in biomedical sciences primarily originated from the need to study metabolism by using tracers. In contrast, System dynamics originated as a simple method of developing mathematical models by Jay Wright Forrester and colleagues. System dynamics represents a compartment or pool as a stock and movement among compartments as flows. In general, the rate of flow depends on the amount of material in the stock to which it is connected. It is common to represent this dependence as a constant proportion (or first-order) using a connector element in the model.

System dynamics is one application of the field of control theory. In the biomedical field, one of the strongest advocates for computer-based analysis of physiological problems was Dr. Arthur Guyton. For example, system dynamics has been used to analyze the problem of body weight regulation. Similar methods have been used to study the spread of epidemics (see Compartmental models in epidemiology).

Software that solves systems of equations required for compartmental modeling and system dynamics makes use of finite difference methods to represent a set of ordinary differential equations. An expert appraisal of the different types of dynamic behavior that can be developed by application of the plateau principle to the field of system dynamics has been published.
