= DYNAMO (programming language) =

Simulation language & graphical notation

DYNAMO (DYNAmic MOdels) is a simulation language and accompanying graphical notation developed within the system dynamics analytical framework. It was originally for industrial dynamics but was soon extended to other applications, including population and resource studies and urban planning.

DYNAMO was initially developed under the direction of Jay Wright Forrester in the late 1950s, by Dr. Phyllis Fox, Alexander L. Pugh III, Grace Duren, and others at the M.I.T. Computation Center.

DYNAMO was used for the system dynamics simulations of global resource depletion reported in the Club of Rome's Limits to Growth, but has since fallen into disuse.

== Beginnings ==
In 1958, Forrester unwittingly instigated DYNAMO's development when he asked an MIT staff programmer to compute needed solutions to some equations, for a Harvard Business Review paper he was writing about industrial dynamics. The programmer, Richard Bennett, chose to implement a system (SIMPLE - "Simulation of Industrial Management Problems with Lots of Equations") that took coded equations as symbolic input and computed solutions. SIMPLE became the proof-of-concept for DYNAMO: rather than have a specialist programmer "hard-code" a special-purpose solver in a general purpose programming language, users could specify a system's equations in a special simulation language and get simulation output from one program execution.

== Design goals ==
DYNAMO was designed to emphasize the following:

- ease-of-use for the industrial dynamics modeling community (who were not assumed to be expert programmers);
- immediate execution of the compiled model, without producing an intermediate object file; and
- providing graphical output, with line printer and pen plotter graphics.

Among the ways in which DYNAMO was above the standard of the time, it featured units checking of numerical types and relatively clear error messages.

== Implementation ==
The earliest versions were written in assembly language for the IBM 704, then for the IBM 709 and IBM 7090. DYNAMO II was written in AED-0, an extended version of Algol 60. Dynamo II/F, in 1971, generated portable FORTRAN code and both Dynamo II/F and Dynamo III improved the system's portability by being written in FORTRAN.

Originally designed for batch processing on mainframe computers, it was made available on minicomputers in the late 1970s, and became available as "micro-Dynamo" on personal computers in the early 1980s. The language went through several revisions from DYNAMO II up to DYNAMO IV in 1983,

== Impact and issues ==
Apart from its (indirectly felt) public impact in environmental issues raised by the controversy over Limits to Growth, DYNAMO was influential in the history of discrete-event simulation even though it was essentially a package for continuous simulation specified through difference equations. It has been said by some to have opened opportunities for computer modelling even for users of relatively low mathematical sophistication. On the other hand, it has also been criticized as weak precisely where mathematical sophistication should be required and for relying only on Euler integration.

== Bibliography ==
- Introduction to System Dynamics Modeling with Dynamo (1981), George P. Richardson; Alexander L. Pugh III, Pegasus Communications, ISBN 1-883823-43-9
- Modeling the Environment: An Introduction To System Dynamics Modeling Of Environmental Systems (1999), Andrew Ford, Island Press, ISBN 1-55963-601-7
  - Appendix D: Dynamo
- "The Prophet of Unintended Consequences", Lawrence M. Fisher, strategy+business #40 Autumn 2005
- Corporate Planning and Policy Design: A System Dynamics Approach (1981), James M. Lyneis, (MIT Press/Wright-Allen Series in System Dynamics) ISBN 0-262-12083-6
- Modeling for Learning Organizations (2000), John D.W. Morecroft, John D. Sterman; Productivity Press (System Dynamics Series) (Hardcover) ISBN 1-56327-250-4
- Dynamics of growth in a finite world (1974), Dennis L. Meadows, Wright-Allen Press, ISBN 0-9600294-4-3
  - Appendix C: How to Read a DYNAMO Flow Diagram;
  - Appendix D: How to Read Dynamo Equations
  - Appendix E: How to Read a DYNAMO Graphical Output
- Computer-Assisted Theory Building: Modeling Dynamic Social Systems (1988), Dr. Robert Hanneman, Sage Publications, Inc., 0803929617
- Computer Simulation in Management Science (1998), Michael Pidd, Wiley, ISBN 0-471-97931-7
- Simulation for the social scientist (2005), G. Nigel Gilbert, Klaus G. Troitzsch, Open University Press, ISBN 0-335-21600-5
