= Forrester effect mapping =

Technique to analyse supply chain disturbance

The Forrester effect map is a business technique used to analyse the disturbance on the supply chain of reorder activity.

The tool is one of the seven value stream mapping tools as defined by Hines and Rich.

Forrester's research, (Industrial Dynamics, MIT Press 1961) showed that demand could be erratic with peaks and troughs commonplace within most organizations. These variations in requirements and supply are amplified within the supply chain when re-orders are made.

== Process ==
The map is portrayed as a graph with a line showing elements such as customer forecasts, shipments to customers, orders for raw materials on the y-axis, over a period of time shown on the x axis.

== Results ==
Distortion between inventory levels is shown as a result of poor communication and an inability to schedule accurately. The flatter the lines displayed the leaner the system and more accurate the forecast.

== See also ==
- Bullwhip effect
- Jay Forrester
