= Phyllis Fox =

American mathematician and computer scientist (1923–2017)

Phyllis Ann Fox
- Born: March 13, 1923; Denver, Colorado, U.S.
- Died: May 23, 2017 (aged 94)
- Education: Wellesley College; University of Colorado Boulder; Massachusetts Institute of Technology
- Known for: DYNAMO (programming language); LISP; PORT Mathematical Subroutine Library
- Scientific career
- Workplaces: General Electric; Courant Institute of Mathematical Sciences; Massachusetts Institute of Technology; Newark College of Engineering; Bell Labs
- Thesis: On the use of coordinate perturbations in the solution of physical problems (1954)
- Doctoral advisor: Chia-Chiao Lin

Phyllis Ann Fox (March 13, 1923 – May 23, 2017) was an American mathematician, electrical engineer and computer scientist.

== Early life and education ==
Fox was born on March 13, 1923, and raised in Colorado. She did her undergraduate studies at Wellesley College, earning a Bachelor of Arts in mathematics in 1944.

From 1944 until 1946 she worked for General Electric as an operator for their differential analyser project. She earned a second baccalaureate, a Bachelor of Science in electrical engineering, from the University of Colorado Boulder in 1948. She then moved on to graduate studies at the Massachusetts Institute of Technology, earning an Master of Science in 1949 in electrical engineering, and a doctorate (Sc.D.) in mathematics in 1954 under the supervision of Chia-Chiao Lin. During this time, she also worked as an assistant on the Whirlwind project at the Massachusetts Institute of Technology, under Jay Wright Forrester.

== Later career ==
From 1954 to 1958, Fox worked on the numerical solution of partial differential equations on the Univac, for the Computing Center of the United States Atomic Energy Commission at the Courant Institute of Mathematical Sciences of New York University. In 1958, following her husband, she returned to Jay Wright Forrester's system dynamics research group at Massachusetts Institute of Technology, where she became part of the team that wrote the DYNAMO programming language. She then became a collaborator on the first LISP interpreter, and was the main author of the first LISP manual.

In 1963, she moved from Massachusetts Institute of Technology to the Newark College of Engineering, where she became a full professor in 1972. During this time, she also consulted for Bell Labs, where she moved in 1973 to work on a highly portable numerics library (PORT). She retired from Bell Labs in 1984.

== Personal life and death ==
Fox married George Sternlieb. They moved to Short Hills, New Jersey in 1949. Fox died on May 23, 2017, at the age of 94.

== Recognition ==
Fox was named a Fellow of the American Association for the Advancement of Science in 1986.
