= Magoroh Maruyama =

Japanese-American educator and researcher

- Born: April 29, 1929
- Died: March 16, 2018 (aged 88)

Academic background
- Education: Ludwig-Maximilians-Universität München; Heidelberg University; Lund University

Academic work
- Institutions: Stanford University; Brandeis University; Antioch College; University of Hawaii at Manoa; University of Illinois

Magoroh Maruyama (April 29, 1929 – March 16, 2018) was a Japanese/American business educator, consultant and researcher, best known for his contributions to cybernetics.

== Biography ==
Maruyama was born in 1929 in Tokyo, Japan, son of Shinsaku Maruyama and Toyoko (Takashima) Maruyama, and moved to the United States in 1950. He received his B.A. from the University of California, Berkeley in 1951. After postgraduate studies at the Ludwig-Maximilians-Universität München and Heidelberg University in Germany, he obtained his Ph.D. from Lund University in Sweden.

Maruyama started his academic career as assistant professor in human development at the University of California, Berkeley in 1960. Among his many academic appointments he was professor for Systems Science at Portland State University from 1973 to 1976. He was also Professor in the School of International Politics, Economics and Communication at Aoyama Gakuin University in Japan and was on the faculty of Stanford University, Brandeis University, Antioch College, the University of Hawaii at Manoa and the University of Illinois.

== Work ==
Magoroh Maruyama is the author of over a hundred publications. The subjects of his research include cybernetics, systems science, philosophy, psychology, neuroscience, anthropology, sociology, social change, business management, architectural design and urban planning. He has been consulting companies and institutions such as NASA, the US Department of Commerce and the US Department of Interior in the United States, the OECD, Volvo and Michelin in Europe, the MITI of Japan, the City of Baghdad, the Government of Ivory Coast and Federal Motors of Indonesia.

His highly cited paper from 1963 "The second cybernetics: Deviation-amplifying mutual causal processes" describes a theory of increase of heterogeneity by causal loops.

== Publications ==
Some of Maruyama's best known publications are:

- Maruyama, Magoroh. "Morphogenesis and morphostasis." Methodos 12.48 (1960): 251-296.
- Maruyama, Magoroh. "The second cybernetics: Deviation-amplifying mutual causal processes." American scientist 51.2 (1963): 164-179.
- Maruyama, Magoroh. "Paradigmatology and its Application to Cross‐Disciplinary, Cross‐Professional and Cross‐Cultural Communication." Dialectica 28.3‐4 (1974): 135-196.
- Maruyama, Magoroh. "Heterogenistics and morphogenetics." Theory and society 5.1 (1978): 75-96.
- Maruyama, Magoroh, Beals, K.L. & Bharati, A. "Mindscapes and Science Theories [and Comments and Reply]." Current anthropology 21.5 (1980): 589-608.
- Maruyama, Magoroh. "Alternative concepts of management: Insights from Asia and Africa." Asia Pacific Journal of Management 1.2 (1984): 100-111.
- Maruyama, Magoroh (editor). "Context and Complexity: cultivating contextual understanding". New York: Springer-Verlag. 1991.
