= Stock depth =

Supply chain terminology

Stock depth is the total stock level build up in a supply chain, from the firm most upstream to the firm most downstream in the chain. The stock depth of the supply chain is calculated as the sum of the stock levels of all firms in a given supply chain.

== Relation with Lehman wave ==
Stock depth is an important element in the behavior of the Lehman wave. If the growth of an end market changes X% in a period t, the supply chain on average changes (1+0.5*Stock depth/t)*X% Therefore Y%= Stock Multiplier * X% = (1+SD/t) * X%. If SD=1 and t=1 the multiplier for the average supply chain is 1 1/2. If the change is more sudden, say, within 6 months, the multiplier is 2, and if the change is very sudden, say within 3 months, the multiplier is as high as 3.

In a market with stable growth the effects are small. The further away a company is from the end market, the bigger the reaction. Firms that are far from the end market thus experience higher variations in growth. During a Lehman Wave, firms start active destocking. If the stock depth of a supply chain is large, the variation in growth becomes larger too, explaining why firms upstream in the supply chain experienced heavy growth variations during the Lehman Wave. During the Lehman Wave, companies upstream were hit more than companies downstream in the supply chain.

When the sales of automobiles suddenly dropped in Q4 2008, the suppliers to the automotive producers not only had to absorb the decline itself, but also the corresponding re-active destocking in the whole supply chain that followed the declining end market. This is because the Automotive industry started active destocking.
