= Vicious circle =

Self-reinforcing sequence of events

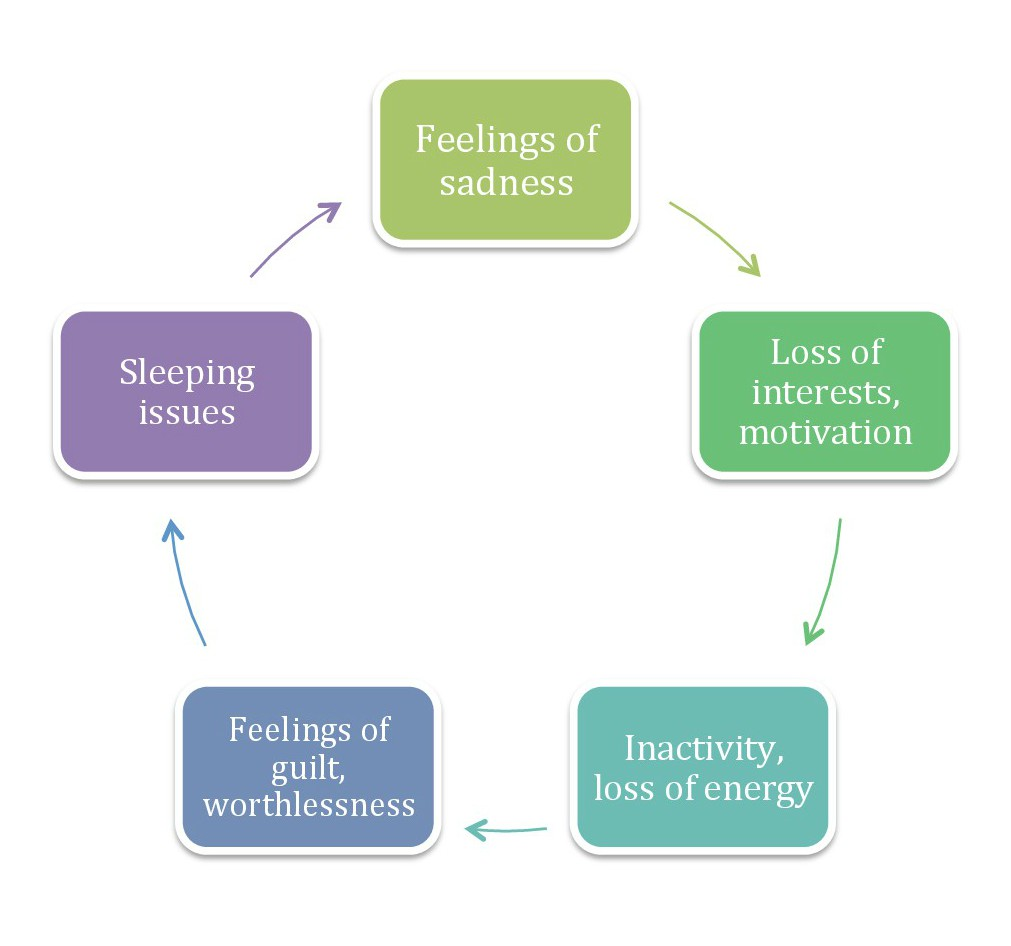
Depression expressed as a vicious circle

A vicious circle (or cycle) is a complex chain of events that reinforces itself through a feedback loop, with detrimental results. It is a system with no tendency toward equilibrium (social, economic, ecological, etc.), at least in the short run. Each iteration of the cycle reinforces the previous one, in an example of positive feedback. A vicious circle will continue in the direction of its momentum until an external factor intervenes to break the cycle. A well-known example of a vicious circle in economics is hyperinflation.

When the results are not detrimental but beneficial, the term virtuous cycle is used instead.

== Examples ==
=== Subprime mortgage crisis ===
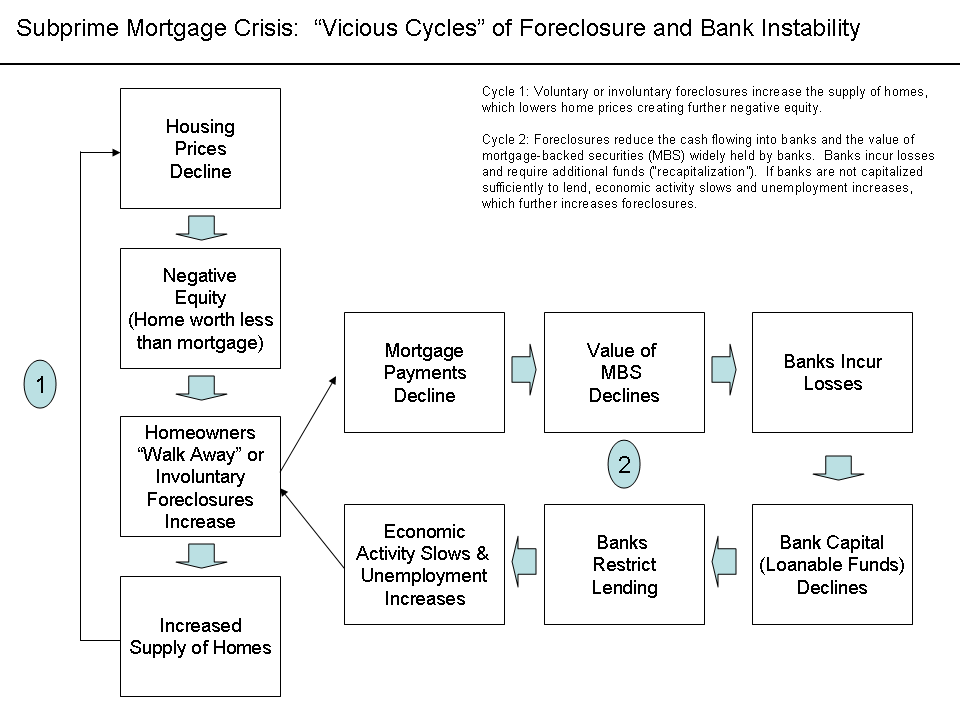
Vicious cycles in the subprime mortgage crisis

The contemporary subprime mortgage crisis is a complex group of vicious circles, both in its genesis and in its manifold outcomes, most notably the late 2000s recession. A specific example is the circle related to housing. As housing prices decline, more homeowners go "underwater", when the market value of a home drops below that of the mortgage on it. This provides an incentive to walk away from the home, increasing defaults and foreclosures. This, in turn, lowers housing values further from over-supply, reinforcing the cycle.

The foreclosures reduce the cash flowing into banks and the value of mortgage-backed securities (MBS) widely held by banks. Banks incur losses and require additional funds, also called "recapitalization". If banks are not capitalized sufficiently to lend, economic activity slows and unemployment increases, which further increase the number of foreclosures. Economist Nouriel Roubini discussed vicious circles in the housing and financial markets in interviews with Charlie Rose in September and October 2008.

=== Virtuous cycles ===
Production of technology such as renewable energy sources starts a positive feedback loop to form what has been called a virtuous cycle—the opposite of a vicious cycle. For example, as more and more solar modules are deployed, prices fall because of the economies of scale, allowing the technology to become cost-competitive in new applications that in turn increase demand for more deployment.

A virtuous cycle is the opposite of a vicious cycle. By involving all stakeholders in managing ecological areas, a virtuous circle can be created where improved ecology encourages the actions that maintain and improve the area.

=== Other ===
Other examples include the poverty cycle, sharecropping, and the intensification of drought. In 2021, Austrian Chancellor Alexander Schallenberg described the recurring need for lockdowns in the COVID-19 pandemic as a vicious circle that could only be broken by a legally-required vaccination program.

== See also ==
- Catch-22 (logic) – Situation in which one cannot avoid a problem because of contradictory constraints
- Causal loop diagram – Visualization of variable interrelationships
- Chain reaction – Self-amplifying chain of events
- Cycle of poverty – Vicious cycle that reinforces poverty
- Cycle of violence – Violent behavior learned as a child, and then repeated as an adult
- Closed timelike curve – World line of a particle in spacetime which returns to its starting point
- Endogeneity (econometrics) – Concept in econometrics
- Positive feedback – Loop that increases an initial effect
- Rational addiction – Addiction modeled as economically rational form of consumption
- Reflexivity (sociology) – Circular relationships between cause and effect
- Self-fulfilling prophecy – Prediction that causes itself to become true
- Spiral of silence – Political science and mass communication theory
- Unintended consequences – Unforeseen outcomes of an action
- Weight cycling – Cyclical loss and gain of weight

== General and cited references ==
- Schlesinger, L.; Heskett, J. (1991). "Breaking the cycle of failure in services". Sloan Management Review. 31: 17–28.
- Rational Choice with Passion:Virtue in a Model of Rational Addiction – In this link the author uses Aristotelian virtue as a mediator between passion and reason in the construction of utility/consumption functions in an esoteric part of consumer behaviour theory related to decision making in addictive situations.
- China: A Stabilizing or Deflationary Influence in East Asia? The Problem of Conflicted Virtue – In this paper the author is using virtue in the sense of a positive outcome (balance of payments surplus) that conflicts with long term regional growth and stability.
