= Beer distribution game =

Game

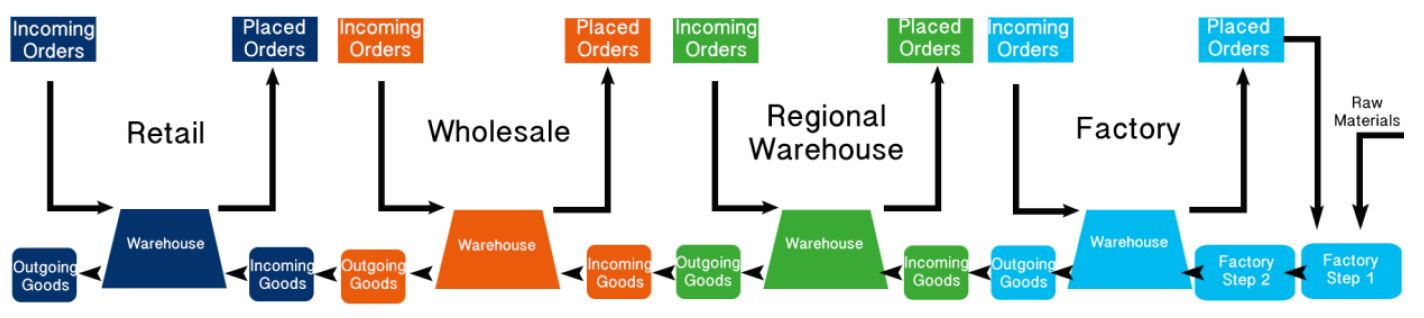
- An example of players at a game board.
- Players: Multiple teams with a minimum of 4 players
- Setup time: 10–20 minutes
- Playing time: 60–90 minutes; another 60–90 minutes for debriefing
- Chance: None
- Skills: Recommended for graduate students, members of the business management community

The beer distribution game (also known as the beer game) is an educational game that is used to experience typical coordination problems of a supply chain process. It reflects a role-play simulation where several participants play with each other. The game represents a supply chain with a non-coordinated process where problems arise due to lack of information sharing. This game outlines the importance of information sharing, supply chain management and collaboration throughout a supply chain process. Due to lack of information, suppliers, manufacturers, sales people and customers often have an incomplete understanding of what the real demand of an order is. The most interesting part of the game is that each group has no control over another part of the supply chain. Therefore, each group has only significant control over their own part of the supply chain. Each group can highly influence the entire supply chain by ordering too much or too little which can lead to a bullwhip effect. Therefore, the order taking of a group also highly depends on decisions of the other groups.

== History ==
The Beer Game was invented by Jay Wright Forrester at the MIT Sloan School of Management in 1960. The beer game was a result of his work on system dynamics.

== Rules ==
In the beer game participants enact a four-stage supply chain. The task is to produce and deliver units of beer: the factory produces, and the other three stages deliver the beer units until it reaches the customer at the downstream end of the chain. The goal of the game is to meet customer demand with minimal expenditure on back orders and inventory.

The game is played in 24 rounds and in each round of the game the following four steps have to be performed:

1. Check deliveries: How many units of beer are being delivered to the player from the wholesaler.
2. Check orders: How many units the customer has ordered.
3. Deliver beer: Deliver as much beer as a player can to satisfy the demand (in this game the step is performed automatically).
4. Make order decision: Decide how many units are needed to order to maintain stock.

As previously said, there are four stages, manufacturer, distributor, supplier, retailer, with a two-week communication gap of orders toward the upstream and a two-week supply chain delay of product towards the downstream. There is a one-point cost for holding excess inventory and a one-point cost for any backlog (old backlog + orders - current inventory). In the board game version, players cannot see anything other than what is communicated to them through pieces of paper with numbers written on them, signifying orders or product. The retailer draws from a deck of cards for what the customer demands, and the manufacturer places an order which, in turn, becomes product in four weeks.

Players look to one another within their supply chain frantically trying to figure out where things are going wrong. The team or supply chain that achieves the lowest total costs wins. At the end during the debriefing, it is explained that these feelings are common and that reactions based on these feelings within supply chains create the bullwhip effect. The game illustrates in a compelling way the effects of poor system understanding and poor communication for even a relatively simple and idealized supply chain. Although players often raise the lack of perfect information about the customer orders as a primary reason for their poor team performance in the game, analysis of the minimum possible score using the optimal strategy under different conditions shows an expected value of perfect information of 0 for the standard game, and simulations that included giving players perfect information still showed poor team performance.

== Supply chain ==
A supply chain is a network between a company and its suppliers to produce and distribute a specific product to the final buyer. This network includes different activities, people, entities, information, and resources. The supply chain also represents the steps it takes to get the product or service from its original state to the customer. Supply chains are developed by companies so they can reduce their costs and remain competitive in the business landscape. It is important to understand how to manage the supply chain in the right way. Supply chain management (SCM) is the management of the flow of goods and services and includes all processes that transform raw materials into final products. It involves the active streamlining of a business's supply-side activities to maximize customer value and gain a competitive advantage in the marketplace. SCM represents an effort by suppliers to develop and implement supply chains that are as efficient and economical as possible. Supply chains cover everything from production to product development to the information systems needed to direct these undertakings.

Typically, SCM attempts to centrally control or link the production, shipment, and distribution of a product. By managing the supply chain, companies are able to cut excess costs and deliver products to the consumer faster. This is done by keeping tighter control of internal inventories, internal production, distribution, sales, and the inventories of company vendors. SCM is based on the idea that nearly every product that comes to market results from the efforts of various organizations that make up a supply chain. Although supply chains have existed for ages, most companies have only recently paid attention to them as a value-add to their operation.

== Bullwhip effect ==
The bullwhip effect (or whiplash or whipsaw effect) is a well-known symptom of coordination problems in traditional supply chains. It refers to the role played by periodical order amounts as one moves upstream in the supply chain toward the production end. Even when demand is stable, small variations in that demand, at the retail-end, tend to dramatically amplify themselves upstream through the supply chain. The resulting effect is that order amounts become very erratic. Very high one week, and then zero the next. The term was first coined around 1990 when Procter & Gamble perceived erratic and amplified order patterns in its supply chain for babies' diapers. As a consequence of the bullwhip effect, a range of inefficiencies occur throughout the supply chain:

- high (safety) stock levels
- poor customer service levels
- poor capacity utilization
- aggravated problems with demand forecasting
- ultimately high cost and low levels of inter-firm trust

While the effect is not new, it is still a timely and pressing problem in contemporary supply chains. Generally, the reasons for the bullwhip effect are:

- Order batching: Happens when each member in the chain orders more quantities than it needs, warping the original quantities demanded.
- Price fluctuation: Special discounts and cost changes can cause buyers to take advantage, resulting in irregular production and distorted demand.
- Demand information misuse: When past demand information for new estimates do not take into account fluctuations.
- Lack of communication: This can lead to constraints when processes are not run efficiently, this usually happens when organizations identify the product demand differently within different links of the supply chain.
- Free return policies: Customers may overstate demands due to shortages, if customers cannot return items, retailers will continue to exaggerate their needs, cancelling orders and causing in excess product or materials.

== Types ==
There are several options how to play the beer game. The various approaches are explained in more detail below.

=== Traditional board game ===
The traditional version of the beer game is a physical board game where people have to move actual objects. The tokens on the board game represent orders and stocks of a supply chain process. The main disadvantage is that this type of beer game takes much more time than the software version. Moreover, it is quite complex to play it since people need physical objects that represent the inventory on the board. Additionally, inventory levels of other supply chain stages are transparent and are therefore quite hard to estimate.

=== Table version ===
This version of the beer game was introduced by the University of Klagenfurt. The game can be played with the usage of paper slips where the players have to write numbers on top. This type of game is a more pragmatic approach to moving orders and stock in the supply chain. Additionally, there is one person with the role of a bookkeeping person that keeps track of everything happening.

==== Adapted ====
The adapted table version is an expanded version of the table version where the bookkeeper is eliminated to achieve a more straightforward game. In order to play this game a spreadsheet and a laptop on each table are needed. The laptops are used for people's play sheets, which eliminates risks of miscalculating inventory levels.

=== Software ===
The software version of the beer game is an online approach. This approach can be either used as a one player simulation demonstration or as a multiplayer simulation demonstration.
