= Pestel =

Pestel may refer to:

== People ==
- Eduard Pestel (1914–1988), German economist, politician, and professor of mechanics
- François Pestel (1763–1828), French naval architect
- Gottfried Pestel (1654–1732), German composer and organist
- Pavel Pestel (1793–1826), revolutionary leader in Russia's 1825 revolt

== Other uses ==
- Pestel, Grand'Anse, a commune in Haïti
- Pestèl City, the principal town of Pestèl commune
- PEST analysis, a schematic for engaging in macro-environmental analysis and research

== See also ==
- Pestle, a blunt club-shaped object used for grinding solids
