= Fritz Fischer (physicist) =

Swiss physicist (1898-1947)

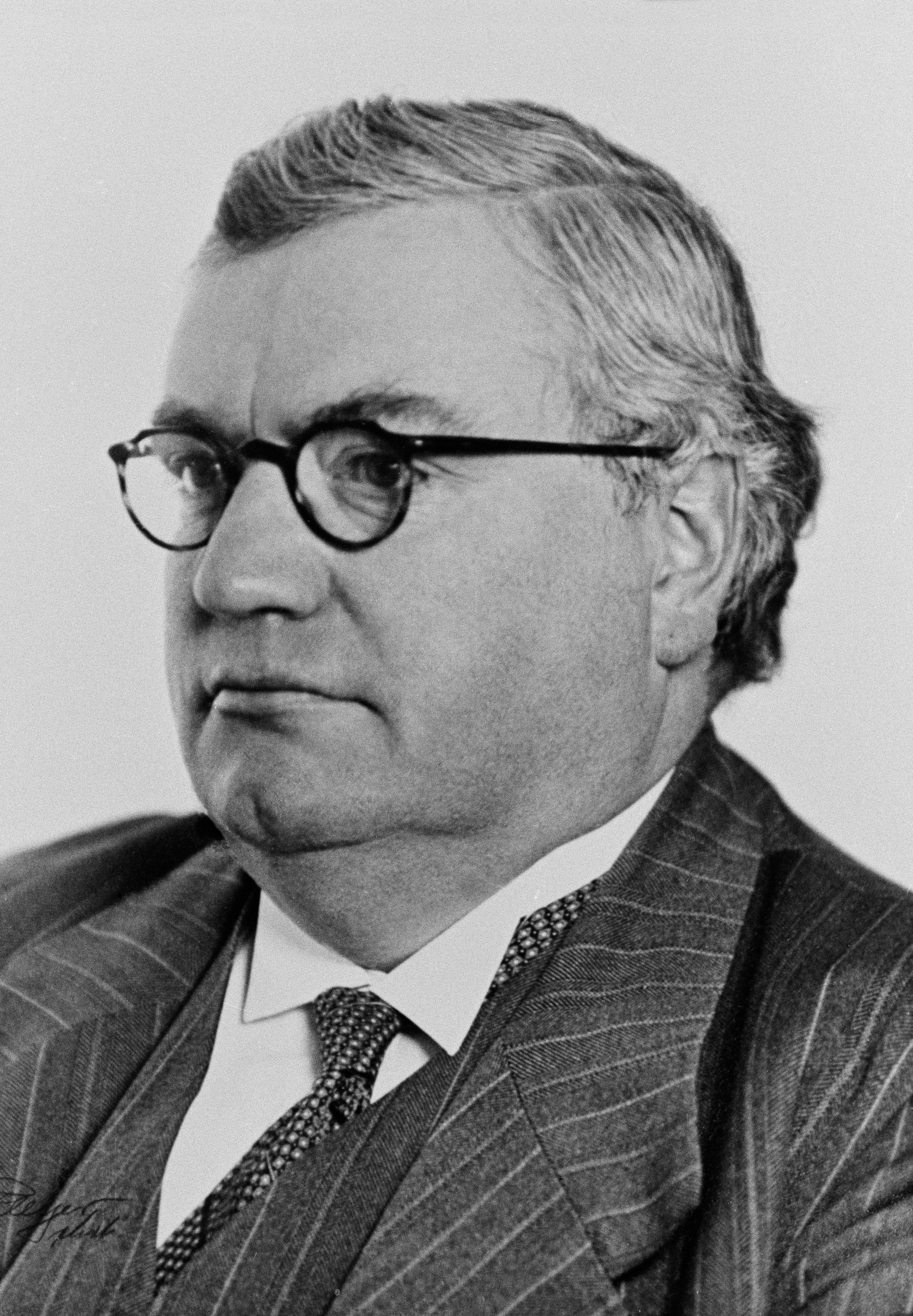
Fritz Fischer in c. 1946

Fritz Fischer (9 February 1898 – 28 December 1947) was a technical physicist, engineer and inventor. He was married to Maud Schätti.

== Biography ==
Fritz Fischer was born on 9 February 1898 in Oberdiessbach. He studied electrical engineering at the ETH Zurich from 1917 till 1921 and graduated as Dr. sc. tech in 1924. Working at the Telephonwerke Albisrieden he improved the transmission quality of speech, whereupon he was called to the central laboratories of the mother company Siemens & Halske in Berlin. There he built the first remotely controlled ships and airplanes and investigated the physical properties of colour film. Over 70 patent applications resulted from his work at Siemens. He was lecturer at the Technische Hochschule in Charlottenburg (now Technische Universität Berlin).

1932 he received a call to the ETH Zurich, where he became professor and founded the Institute of Technical Physics. He developed and patented the Eidophor technique of displaying television pictures the size of cinema screens. Edgar Gretener, his chief assistant at the ETH, was project leader for the development of Eidophor. This project was transferred to a company founded by Gretener, which later became Gretag AG. After years of development, Eidophor achieved commercial success until Liquid Crystal Display LCD (another invention with important Swiss contributors) and Digital Light Processing DLP video projectors became available.

Other early assistants at his Institute were Hugo Thiemann (founding member of the Club of Rome), Gustav Guanella, Werner Lindecker and Erna Hamburger, who became famous on their own.

Fritz Fischer was one of the important technical scientists of his day. He was co-founder together with Max Lattmann, his first Ph.D. graduate, of Contraves AG, a Swiss defence and aerospace company, now part of Rheinmetall Air Defence AG, Zürich.

Fischer died on 28 December 1947 in Zürich, at the age of 49.
