= Alexander Christakis =

American social scientist (born 1937)

Aleco Christakis
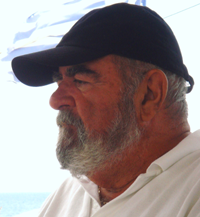
- Born: 1937 (age 88–89); Archanes, Crete, Greece
- Education: Yale University
- Awards: The Hellenic Society for Systemic Studies Medal (2007); DEMOSOPHIA Award (1993); Creative Programming Award' (1983)
- Scientific career
- Fields: nuclear physics systems science structured dialogic design
- Workplaces: Institute for 21st Century Agoras; Future Worlds Center

Alexander "Aleco" Christakis (Greek: Αλέξανδρος Χρηστάκης; born 1937) is a Greek American social scientist, systems scientist and cyberneticist, former faculty member of several Universities, organizational consultant and member of the Club of Rome, known for his "study and design of social systems".

== Biography ==
Christakis came to the United States in 1956, and received a BA in theoretical physics at Princeton University and a Ph.D. in theoretical nuclear physics at Yale. Later on he proceeded studying urban planning, and systems science until 1970.^{where?}

After the birth of his son Nicholas he returned to Greece and joined the architectural firm of Doxiadis Associates which was specialized in architecture and town planning. In 1968 he was co-founder of the Club of Rome, where he was a collaborator of Aurelio Peccei, Erich Jantsch and Hasan Özbekhan. Since the 1970s Christakis has served on the faculties of Yale University, Georgetown University, University of Athens, and the University of Virginia. He also spent five years at George Mason University as the Director of the Center for Interactive Management headed by John N. Warfield. In 1989 Christakis founded his own management consultancy firm CWA Ltd. dedicated to apply Interactive Management principles, and he has been CEO ever since.

Christakis serves on the Editorial Boards of several journals, including Systems Research and Behavioral Sciences, Systems: Journal of Transdisciplinary Systems Science, and the Journal of Applied Systems Studies.

In 2002, Christakis served as president of the International Society for the Systems Sciences. He also serves as president of the Institute for 21st Century Agoras, a non-profit organization dedicated to the evolution of civic, global, and institutional capacity for coordinated democratic decision-making using systems principles (Co-Laboratories of Democracy.) The Institute for 21st Century Agoras is credited for the formalization of the science of Structured dialogic design in its present form. Christakis is also a partner with Dialogic Design International, a consulting firm that deploys SDD in systemic design approaches for complex organizational and systems problems.

In 2007 he served on the board of directors of the Americans for Indian Opportunity (AIO), of Future Worlds Center, and also as an Advisor to the Ambassadors Program of AIO which serves indigenous people around the world.

He has received numerous awards and distinctions including the Demosophia Award, the Creative Programming Award from the National University Continuing Education Association and the most prestigious medal of the Hellenic Society for Systemic Studies to name a few.

== Contributions to international peace building ==
Christakis has been invited to support the peace process in Cyprus and the Middle East. He and Laouris led the implementation of series of mass scale dialogues using the structured dialogic design process in the Civil Society Dialogue project in Cyprus and in the Act Beyond Borders project in Middle East.

== Publications ==
Christakis has published over 100 papers on the management of complexity in refereed journals. He is also the co-author of three books on "Technology Assessment". Books:

- 2009. The Talking Point:Creating an Environment for Exploring Complex Meaning. With T.R. Flanangan. Boston, MA: Information Age Publishing.
- 2006. Co-laboratories of democracy: how people harness their collective wisdom to create the future. With Kenneth C. Bausch. Boston, MA: Information Age Publishing.
- 2005. Pragmatic Design Dialogue.

Articles and papers, a selection:

- 1970. "The Predicament of Mankind Quest for Structured Responses for Growing World-wide Complexities and Uncertainties". With co-authors like Hasan Özbekhan, Erich Jantsch, Peccei, ...and others (PDF)
- 1987. John N. Warfield, and Christakis, A.N. "Dimensionality," Systems Research 4, pp. 127–137
- 2004. "Retrospective Inquiry of the predicament of menkind prospectus of the Club of Rome"
- 2009. Interview: Learnings and Vistas based on revisiting 40 years of the "Global Problematique" Interview in Europe'sWorld by Heiner Benking , November, 2009
- 2011. Interview: The Predicament of the Individual, Communities, and Humankind in the 21st Century by Heiner Benking, September 2011
