= Hasan Özbekhan =

Turkish philosopher (1921–2007)

Dr. Hasan Özbekhan (1921–February 12, 2007) was a Turkish American systems scientist, cyberneticist, philosopher and planner who was Professor Emeritus of Management at the Wharton School of the University of Pennsylvania. He applied the field-of-systems theory to global problems, helped inspire the group of planners, diplomats, scientists and academics who came together as the Club of Rome.

== Biography ==
Hasan Özbekhan was born in what was then the Ottoman Empire in 1921, into a diplomatic family. He studied at the Lycée Chateaubriand in Rome, and then studied Law and Political and Administrative sciences at the Faculte de Droit and the École Libre des Sciences Politiques in Paris, and his graduate studies at the London School of Economics. He undertook his postgraduate work at the University of Cambridge after being elected to the Leverhume Fellowship.

In the 1960s, Ozbekhan worked as management consultant to large multinational corporations. The work he did for governments includes Science Policy design for Turkey and a large study for the French Government analyzing the nature of present events that, most probably, will shape the future of Paris. The recommendations derived from these analyses currently constitute the basis of the policies adopted by the French Government with respect to the city's long-term development. From 1963 to 1969, he was principal scientist and director of planning at the System Development Corporation, a military research group and software development company in Santa Monica, California.

In 1970, he started working at the University of Pennsylvania on the faculty of the Wharton School, where he became Professor of Operations Research and Statistics, and Chairman of the Graduate Group in the Social Systems Sciences Department. From 1986 until his retirement in 1992 he was Professor of Management at the Wharton School.

He has been a Fellow of the Royal Economic Society, and held membership in The Economic Club of New York, the American Economic Association, the National Academy of Economics and Political Science, The Society of Business Advisory Professions, the Comité National Belge de l'Organisation Scientifique, the American Society for Political and Legal Philosophy, Mankind 2000, Futuribles.

He died on February 12, 2007, in Philadelphia.

== Work ==
Özbekhan applied the field-of-systems theory to global problems, helped inspire the group of planners, diplomats, scientists and academics who came together as the Club of Rome. He wrote a paper, "The Predicament of Mankind," that became an influential core document of the group, addressing issues of energy, overpopulation, depletion of resources and environmental degradation.

In the 1970s Özbekhan was co founder and first director of The Club of Rome, with Aurelio Peccei an Italian Industrialist, and Alexander Christakis, a physicist and systems research designer. Özbekhan wrote the original prospectus for The Club of Rome, The Predicament of Mankind. This document served as vision for systems scientists who, under the leadership of Alexander Christakis and the 21st Century Agoras developed the science of structured dialogic design. Özbekhan is credited for the formulation of the Axiom of Engagement, which states that 'it is unethical to try to change any socio-technical system without the explicit permission and participation of those involved'. The related Requisite Law of Action states that 'any attempts to do so are bound to fail' (Law of Requisite Action; Yiannis Laouris).

Together with Robert Jungk, Johan Galtung and many others he was member of MANKIND 2000.

== Publications ==
- 1957, The Isle of Princes
- 1968, Toward a General Theory of Planning.
- 1970, The Predicament of Mankind. Report to the Club of Rome.
