= Guanella =

Guanella is an Italian surname. Notable people with the surname include:

- Gustav Guanella (1909–1982), Swiss inventor
- Luigi Guanella (1842–1915), Italian Roman Catholic priest

== See also ==
- Guanella Pass, a mountain pass of Colorado, United States
