= One-page management system =

The one-page management system (OPMS) is a set of methods to help people generate ideas through systematic brainstorming and to structure (or organize) ideas as needed for effective resolution of problems. G. S. Chandy invented OPMS, based on John N. Warfield's "interactive management" and "structural approach to system design". OPMS has been applied and codified by other entrepreneurial practitioners across the world, and has been summarized by Alexander Christakis, a long-standing collaborator of Warfield.

OPMS aims to enable 'people-at-large' as well as experts to create and implement usable systems of all kinds—individual, organisational or societal.

In brief, OPMS enables individual and group users to:

1. Choose an appropriate 'mission' depending on problem/situation confronted;
2. Identify the issue or problem, which provides a simple 'mission statement';
3. Integrate all the good ideas available to tackle the problem or issue at hand, and eliminate the bad ideas—with a view to enable accomplishment of the chosen mission.

The structuring methods of OPMS have developed from the systems modeling tools invented by Warfield:

- Interpretive structural modeling (ISM); and
- Field representation & profiling method (FRP).
