= Alfred A. Marcus =

American academic (born 1950)

Alfred Marcus
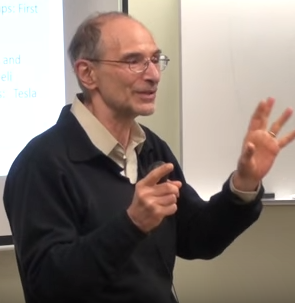
- Born: 1950 (age 75–76); Pittsburgh, Pennsylvania, U.S.
- Education: University of Chicago; Harvard University; Technion; Tel Aviv University
- Known for: Innovation and sustainability
- Scientific career
- Fields: Environmental policy; Business strategy; Clean technologies; Business ethics; Energy
- Workplaces: Carlson School of Management, University of Minnesota; Battelle Memorial Institute; Technion, INCAE; BI Norwegian Business School; MIT
- Thesis: What Does Reorganization Accomplish: The Case of the Environmental Protection Agency (1977)
- Doctoral advisor: James Q. Wilson

Alfred Allen Marcus (born 1950) is an American author and the Edson Spencer Professor of Strategy and Technology Leadership at the Carlson School of Management, University of Minnesota and the Technological Leadership Institute. He has worked as a consultant with companies such as 3M, Corning Inc., Xcel Energy, Medtronic, General Mills, and IBM and has also taught as a visiting professor at Technion, INCAE, BI Norwegian Business School, Fordham University, and MIT.

== Environmental and energy policy career ==
Marcus was born in Pittsburgh, Pennsylvania and grew up in the Squirrel Hill neighborhood. He attended the University of Chicago for his bachelor's and master's degrees, before finishing his PhD in political science at Harvard University under James Q. Wilson. Outside academy, he has worked on environmental and energy policy analysis during the Carter and Reagan years at the Battelle Human Affairs Research Centers in Seattle, Washington. There he conducted and participated in studies on the commercialization of alternative energy technologies and new energy saving technologies.

Following the Three Mile Island nuclear power incident, he also became involved in the work carried out by the Nuclear Regulatory Commission on the organization and management of nuclear power plants. Marcus has written many academic articles relating to organizational safety in publications like the Academy of Management Journal, the Strategic Management Journal, and Organization Science.

=== Published works ===
His work focuses primarily on the relationship between public policy, the environment, and American business and his books include:

- Promise and Performance: Choosing and Implementing an Environmental Policy (1980) - Praeger. ISBN 0-313-207070
- The Adversary Economy (1984) - Praeger. ISBN 0-899-300553
- Managing Environmental Issues: A Casebook (1992) - Prentice Hall. ISBN 0-135-638917
- Controversial Issues in Energy Policy (1992) - SAGE Publications. ISBN 0-803-939701
- Reinventing Environmental Regulation: Lessons from Project XL (2002) -Routledge. ISBN 1-891-853090
- Strategic Foresight - A New Look at Scenarios (2010). - Palgrave Macmillan. ISBN 0-230-611729
- Innovations in Sustainability (2015) - Cambridge University Press. ISBN 1-107-42111X

=== Selected bibliography ===
- Marcus, Alfred A.; Goodman, R. S. (1991). "Victims and Shareholders: The Dilemmas of Presenting Corporate Policy During a Crisis". Academy of Management Journal. 34 (2): 281–305. doi:10.2307/256443. JSTOR 256443. Archived from the original on 7 July 2014.
- McEvily, B.; Marcus, A. A. (2005). "Embedded Ties and the Acquisition of Competitive Capabilities". Strategic Management Journal. 26 (11): 1033–1055. doi:10.1002/smj.484.
- Majumdar, S. K.; Marcus, A. A. (2001). "Rules Versus Discretion: The Productivity Consequences of Flexible Regulation". Academy of Management Journal. 44 (1): 170–179. doi:10.2307/3069344. JSTOR 3069344. Archived from the original on 30 March 2014.
- Maxwell, J; Rothenburg, S.; Briscoe, F; Marcus, A. A. (2001). "Green Schemes: Corporate Environmental Strategies and their Implementation". California Management Review. 39 (3): 118–134. doi:10.2307/41165902. hdl:1721.1/1456. JSTOR 41165902. S2CID 153666867. Archived from the original on 2016-02-07.
- Starik, M; Marcus, A. A. (2000). "Introduction to the Special Research Rorum on the Management of Organizations in the Natural Environment: A Field Emerging from Multiple Paths, with Many Challenges Ahead". Academy of Management Journal. 43 (4): 539–547. doi:10.2307/1556354. JSTOR 1556354. Archived from the original on 30 March 2014.
- Marcus, Alfred A.; Fremeth, A. A. (2009). "Green Management Matters Regardless". Academy of Management Perspectives. 23 (3): 17–26. doi:10.5465/AMP.2009.43479261.
- Marcus, Alfred A.; Nichols, M. L. (1998). "On the Edge: Heeding the Warnings of Unusual Events". Organization Science. 10 (4): 482–499. doi:10.1287/orsc.10.4.482.
- Fox, Isaac; Marcus, A. A. (1992). "The Causes and Consequences of Leveraged Management Buyouts". Academy of Management Review. 17 (1): 62–85. doi:10.5465/AMR.1992.4279571.
- Marcus, Alfred A.; Anderson, M. (2006). "A General Dynamic Capability: Does it Propagate Business and Social Competencies in the Retail Food Industry?". Journal of Management Studies. 43 (1): 19–46. doi:10.1111/j.1467-6486.2006.00581.x.
- Naveh, E; Marcus, A. A. (2004). "When Does the ISO 9000 Quality Assurance Standard Lead to Performance Improvement? Assimilation and Going Beyond". IEEE Transactions on Engineering Management. 51 (3): 352–363. doi:10.1109/TEM.2004.830864. S2CID 19656993.
- Marcus, Alfred (1988). "Implementing Externally Induced Innovations: A Comparison of Rule-bound and Autonomous Approaches". Academy of Management Journal. 31 (2): 235–256. CiteSeerX 10.1.1.383.5492. doi:10.2307/256547. JSTOR 256547. Archived from the original on 9 June 2014.
- Marcus, Alfred A. (1989). "The Deterrent to Dubious Corporate Behavior: Profitability, Probability and Safety Recalls". Strategic Management Journal. 10 (3): 233–250. doi:10.1002/smj.4250100304.
- Marcus, Alfred A.; Geffen, Donald (1998). "The Dialectics of Competency Acquisition: Pollution Prevention in Electric Generation". Strategic Management Journal. 19 (12): 1145–1168. doi:10.1002/(SICI)1097-0266(1998120)19:12<1145::AID-SMJ6>3.0.CO;2-B. JSTOR 3094201.

== See also ==
- Paul Shrivastava
