= Edgar Gretener =

Swiss electrical engineer (1902-1958)

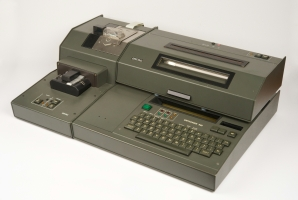
Gretacoder 805 teletype encryptor

Edgar Gretener (2 March 1902 in Lucerne – 21 October 1958 in Zurich) was a Swiss electrical engineer.

Gretener was the twelfth of 14 siblings. He studied electrical engineering at Swiss Federal Institute of Technology (ETH Zurich), where he received his Ph.D. in 1929. He then became head of development at the Albiswerk factory in Zurich. In 1930, he worked as head of the telegraph laboratory of Siemens & Halske in Berlin. There he got in contact with Fritz Fischer (physicist), another Swiss engineer, working as a manager at the central research labs of Siemens. When Fritz Fischer got the call to become professor at the ETH Zurich in 1932, he made Gretener his chief assistant a few years later. Fischer invented the Eidophor video projection system. Gretener was in charge of its implementation.

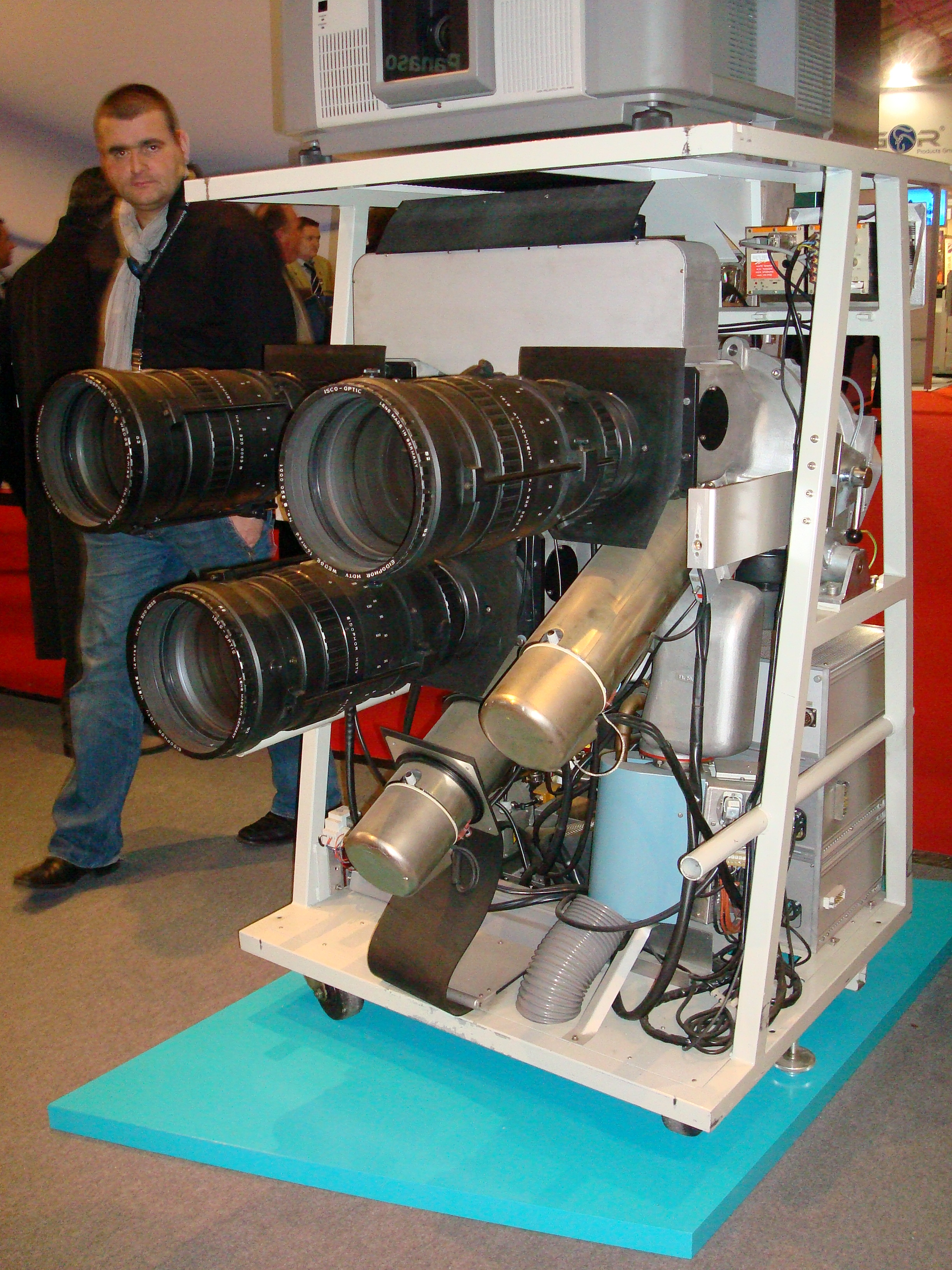
Eidophor Video Projector

When World War II started, the Swiss authorities asked Gretener to develop an encryption device for teleprinters. For this purpose the Dr. Edgar Gretener AG was set up as a company in 1943. Gretener got absorbed by this new challenge. As his replacement, Hugo Thiemann continued the development of the Eidophor system at the ETH. When Fischer died unexpectedly in 1947, Thiemann and the Eidophor project were transferred to Gretener's company. It now had two lines of R&D: encryption devices and Eidophor, which still needed development to make it a viable product. Finally, the marketing effort led to first contracts for this new wide-screen video projection system.

The untimely death of Gretener in 1958 led to the renaming of his company, which continued under new ownership as GRETAG AG.

== Literature ==
- W. Gerber: Obituary in Schweizerische Bauzeitung, 1958 (76), p. 782.
