= Alexander King (chemist) =

British chemist and environmentalist (1909–2007)

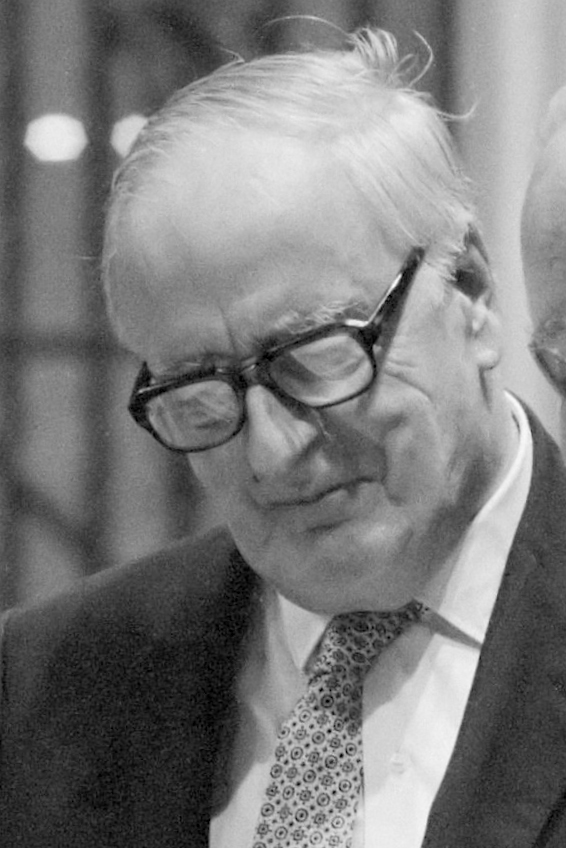
King in 1987

Alexander King CMG CBE (26 January 1909 – 28 February 2007) was a British chemist and pioneer of the sustainable development movement who co-founded the Club of Rome in 1968 with the Italian industrialist Aurelio Peccei. The Club was one of the first institutions to voice concerns about the impact on the environment of unprecedented economic growth in the 20th century. "Peccei and King were lonely prophets at a time of overwhelming optimism," who did much to push environmental issues on to the political agenda. At the time of the Club's founding, King was Director-General for Scientific Affairs at the Paris-based Organisation for Economic Co-operation and Development (OECD).

== Life and career ==
Born in Glasgow, King attended Highgate School and later studied chemistry at Imperial College, where he edited the college's literary magazine and served as president of its literary and debating society. From 1929 to 1931, he pursued postgraduate research on a fellowship at the Ludwig-Maximilians-Universität München. On his return to London, he became a lecturer and then senior lecturer in physical chemistry at Imperial. In 1938, he was awarded the Edward Harrison Memorial Prize by the Royal Society of Chemistry.

With the outbreak of WWII, Sir Henry Tizard invited King to join the Ministry of Production as Deputy Scientific Adviser. It was during this period that a letter from the Geigy Company in Switzerland to its Manchester branch office, detailing the composition of a new "mothballing agent" dichlorodiphenyltrichloroethane, was intercepted by the censor. King recognized the importance of the chemical agent and its potential use as an insecticide, allegedly coining the acronym DDT. In 1943, King travelled to the United States, becoming Head of the UK Scientific Mission and Scientific Attaché at the British Embassy in Washington. Following the war, King became Secretary of the Advisory Council on Scientific Policy and personal adviser to the Lord President of the Council, Herbert Morrison. King was named a Commander of the Order of the British Empire (CBE) in the 1948 Birthday Honours. He later became Chief Scientific Adviser to the Department of Scientific and Industrial Research.

In 1957, King joined the European Productivity Agency (EPA) as Director in Paris, subsequently becoming Director-General for Scientific Affairs at the OECD At the OECD, "he initiated the Science Policy Surveys, which took a critical look at the state of science and technology in the OECD countries. Among other things, his initiatives encouraged new forms of education." He retired from the OECD in 1974, taking up the chairmanship of the International Federation of Institutes of Advanced Studies (IFIAS), an organization based in Stockholm.

== The Club of Rome ==
King has been described as "a cool catalyst with the golden knack of transforming ideas into action." It was while working at the OECD that King co-founded the influential think tank the Club of Rome. In 1966, he came across the transcript of a speech given by Aurelio Peccei and the two met to discuss common interests. With the support of the Agnelli Foundation, they invited 30 European scientists, economists and industrialists to Rome to discuss global issues. While the initial 1968 meeting at Accademia dei Lincei (Palazzo Corsini) was a failure, it led to the formation of a network of individuals with shared concerns about the environmental consequences of untrammelled global development. The first formal meeting of the Club of Rome took place in Bern in 1970.

The 1972 best-selling report The Limits to Growth, which was commissioned by the Club of Rome and funded by the Volkswagen Foundation, was the first attempt to simulate the consequences of development on the earth's limited resources. The book "challenged the economic orthodoxy that the earth would always provide the resources for human prosperity, and became the biggest-selling environmental book in history." In questioning prevalent assumptions about the inevitability and benefits of economic growth, the Club of Rome sometimes provoked fierce controversy and accusations of elitism. Its warnings about the dangers of anthropogenic environmental change were disputed in ways that anticipate contemporary opposition to scientific assessments of global climate change. The Club of Rome's concerns with overpopulation were viewed by some as neo-Malthusian. However, the Club of Rome's mission to bring awareness to the pressures of development on the environment – and in particular the publication of The Limits to Growth – according to King's obituary, "touched a raw nerve in the body politic. Its warnings resonated with the fears of others that there was an emerging environmental crisis. The United Nations Environment Programme was established a few months after [the book] appeared. The word 'environment' does not even appear in the 1945 UN Charter, and King helped expand the UN's role into environmental protection."

After Peccei's death, King served as the Club's President from 1984 to 1990. He was the recipient of many honors: in 1975 he was made a Companion of the Order of St Michael and St George (CMG) and in 1987 he was awarded the Erasmus Prize for his contribution to raising awareness of "the positive and negative impact of technological progress on society."

== Works ==
King's autobiography, Let the Cat Turn Round: One Man's Traverse of the Twentieth Century, was published in 2006 and acclaimed by the scientist, and Limits to Growth co-author Dennis Meadows, as "a chronicle of a century": "Few science policy advisers were better situated than Alex King to observe the way technology co-evolved with politics and economics in the 1900s. This book summarizes his contributions and offers his insights. Both are of major importance." Other books by King include The State of the Planet (Pergamon, 1980) and, with Bertrand Schneider, The First Global Revolution (Pantheon, 1991).

King wrote a monograph, Science, Technology and the Quality of Life (1972) and co-authored An Eye to the Future (1975) for the London-based Institute for Cultural Research, which was founded and directed by the writer and thinker, Idries Shah, a fellow member of the Club of Rome.

== Personal life ==
The King family originated from Dunblane and Doune in Scotland. Alexander King's father, James Mitchell King, worked for the Nobel Explosives Company and eventually became a director of Imperial Chemical Industries (ICI). On his mother's side, King was a descendant of the industrialist David Dale. In 1933, King married Sarah Maskell Thompson whom he had met in Munich, a niece of the Liberal politician Walter Runciman, Viscount Runciman of Doxford, and granddaughter of the Liberal MP and industrialist James Cochran Stevenson. His eldest daughter, Jane, specialised in population studies and later pioneered new multidisciplinary approaches to economic and environmental planning. King’s middle daughter, Catherine Peckham, is a well-known doctor, who became the first Professor of Paediatric Epidemiology in the UK. His youngest daughter, Margaret, a promising oboist, died in a mountaineering accident in France in her early twenties.
