= Gustav Guanella =

Swiss inventor (1909–1982)

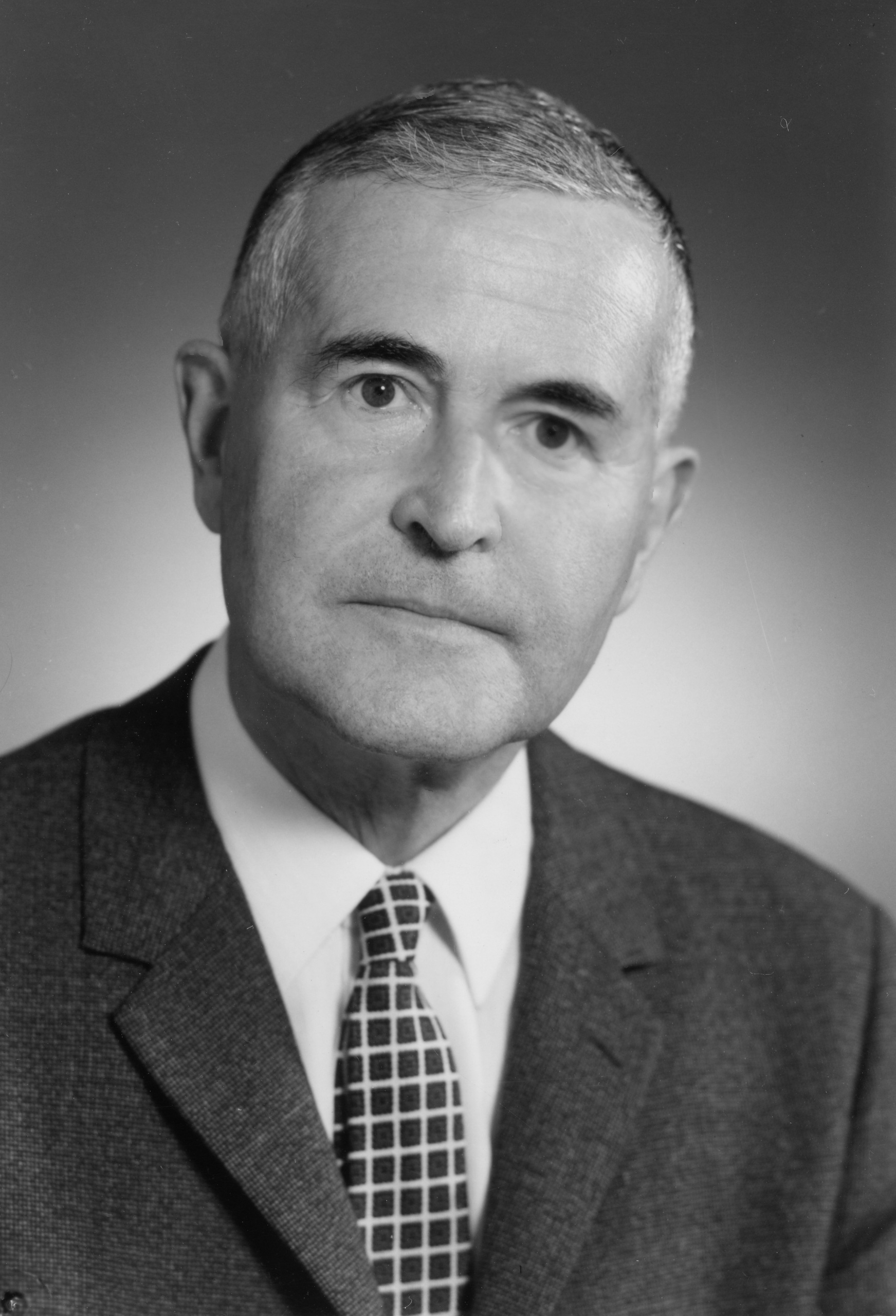

Gustav Guanella (21 June 1909 – 12 January 1982) was a Swiss inventor who held numerous patents.

== Life ==
Guanella was born in Chur, then educated in Lucerne, Switzerland. He finished high school in 1929, studied electrical engineering at the Swiss Federal Institute of Technology in Zurich (ETH Zurich) and graduated in 1933. There, he became assistant to Professor Fritz Fischer, known as the inventor of the Eidophor large-screen video projection system, at the Institute of Technical Physics until 1937, followed by a few years as a consultant to different companies.

In 1938 he married Hanni Zietzschmann.

From 1941 until his retirement he worked for Brown, Boveri & Cie, Baden, Switzerland (BBC). Already in 1943 he was made head of a department involved in high-frequency electronics product development, where he made important contributions to this field.

He retired in 1973 and died of brain tumor in 1982.

== Achievements ==
Guanella had a strong interest in electronics, especially high-frequency (HF) techniques. While he did consulting work for various companies such as Philips, AEG and BBC, he came up with inventions resulting in 40 patent application before entering employment at BBC. Some of these early inventions related to locating and radio direction-finding solutions as predecessors to radar before and during the first years of World War II.

His most important inventions were conceived while working for BBC from 1941 onwards. It is less known that BBC had a rapidly growing electronics division besides electrical equipment manufacturing. Guanella and other outstanding engineers positioned the company in the fields of radio transmitters, power line communications, microwave links and encryption techniques. In particular, Guanella is credited as one of the inventors of the Direct Sequence Spread Spectrum (DSSS) transmission technique. The patent filing date in Switzerland was January 29, 1942. The corresponding U.S. patent 2,405,500 Means for and method of secret signaling was granted in 1946. In the Spread Spectrum Communications Handbook by M.Simon et al., Guanella is referred to as Swiss pioneer of noise-modulated radar and speech privacy systems. DSSS is of considerable importance for mobile radio up to now.

Guanella is best known for the Guanella Balun, a high-frequency impedance adapter. The term balun is an abbreviation of balanced-unbalanced signals, referring to a suitable coupling at such interfaces. Patents were granted in many countries, such as U.S. patent 2,470,307 and GB 617870. Widespread use led to considerable royalty income.

In his lifetime, Guanella was inventor or co-inventor of more than 200 patents. He was not only a brilliant Swiss inventor but also a successful department manager bringing various HF products to the market.

== Honors ==
The Institute of Electrical and Electronics Engineers elevated him to the grade of IEEE Fellow in 1965.

The ETH Zurich honored him with the title Dr. sc. tech. (honoris causa) in 1969 together with Albert Hofmann, discoverer of LSD, married to his sister Anita Guanella.

A building of Asea Brown Boveri (ABB), the company resulting from the merger of Asea and BBC, in Turgi AG, Switzerland, carries his first name.
