= Paul Shrivastava =

Indian scholar

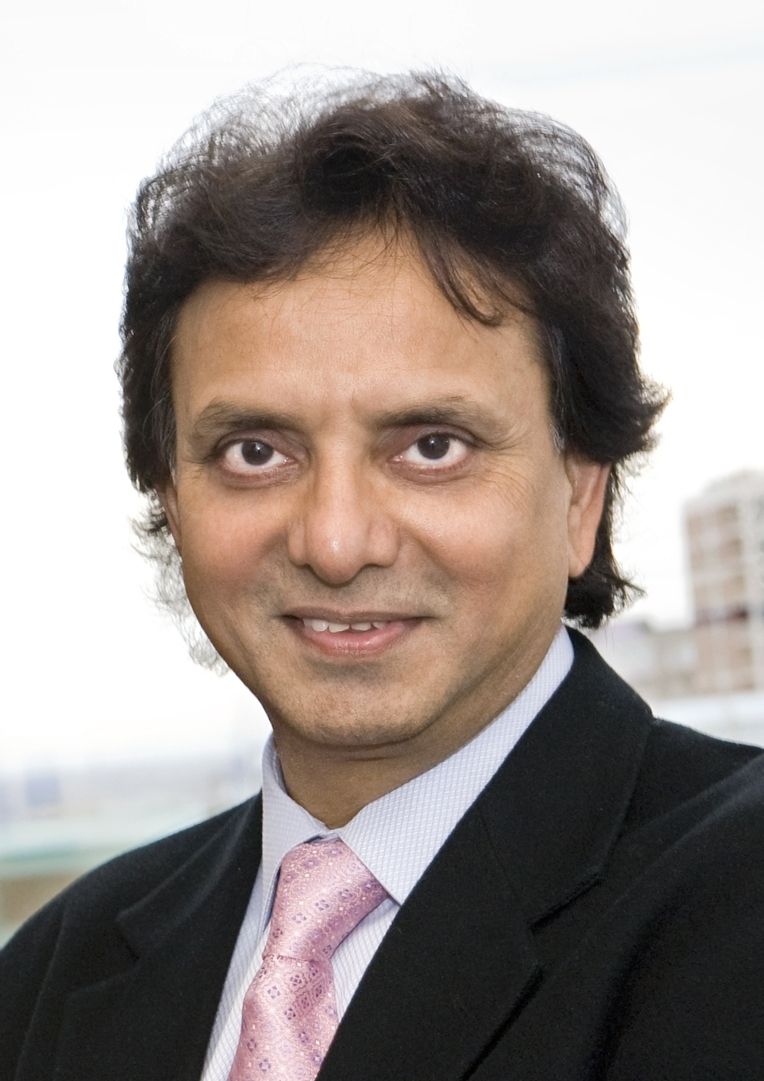
- Paul Shrivastava, in 2011.
- Born: Bhopal, India
- Education: NIT Bhopal, IIM Calcutta
- Known for: Art and Sustainable Enterprise; Crisis Management
- Scientific career
- Fields: Sustainability; Organizational Strategy; Crisis Management
- Workplaces: New York University; Bucknell University; Concordia University; Future Earth; The Pennsylvania State University

Paul Shrivastava is an Indian-American scholar. He is a professor of management and organizations at Pennsylvania State University and a co-president of the Club of Rome. He previously served as Penn State's first chief sustainability officer and director of its Sustainability Institute, was executive director of Future Earth, and was David O'Brien Distinguished Professor of Sustainable Enterprise at Concordia University in Montreal.

His 1987 book Bhopal: Anatomy of a Crisis examined the Bhopal disaster.

== Early life and education ==
Shrivastava was born in Bhopal, India. He attended the St. Joseph's Convent School in Bhopal. He received a bachelor's degree in Mechanical Engineering from the Maulana Azad National Institute of Technology, Bhopal, a Post Graduate Diploma in Management (MBA) from the Indian Institute of Management Calcutta and a Ph.D. from the University of Pittsburgh.

== Academic career ==
Shrivastava held the Howard I. Scott Chair in Management, a distinguished professorship at Bucknell University, and was Associate Professor of Management at the Stern School of Business, New York University. He was awarded a Fulbright Program Senior Scholar award to study Japanese corporate environmental management at Kyoto University, Japan.

In February 2015 Shrivastava was appointed Executive Director of Future Earth. He also holds the International Research Chair in Art and Sustainable Enterprise at ICN Business School, Nancy, France. He has published 17 books and over 100 articles.

Shrivastava later joined Concordia University in Montreal, where he became David O'Brien Distinguished Professor of Sustainable Enterprise at the John Molson School of Business. He was the founding director of the David O'Brien Centre for Sustainable Enterprise.

Shrivastava joined Pennsylvania State University as a professor of management and organizations in the Smeal College of Business. He became the university's first chief sustainability officer and served as director of the Sustainability Institute from 2017 to 2022.

In November 2023, Shrivastava was elected co-president of the Club of Rome. He served as co-president alongside Sandrine Dixon-Decleve and Silvia Zimmermann del Castillo.

== Research ==
Shrivastava is the author of Bhopal: Anatomy of a Crisis (1989), a book that launched the field of organizational crisis management.

A 1988 article co-authored with Ian Mitroff, Danny Miller, and Anil Miclani developed a conceptual framework for industrial crises and compared the Bhopal disaster with the Tylenol poisonings and the Space Shuttle Challenger disaster.

His 1993 article "Crisis theory/practice: Towards a sustainable future" proposed sustainable development as a framework for addressing technological and environmental crises.

In 1995, Shrivastava published "Ecocentric Management for a Risk Society" in the Academy of Management Review.

He developed "embodied learning" methods wherein concepts are intertwined with physically and emotionally engaging activities to create learning experiences that endure and transform.

== Publications ==
Partial List of Publications:

- Shrivastava, P., Bhopal: Anatomy of a Crisis, Vol. 2. Paul Chapman Publishing Ltd, London.: 1992.
- Shrivastava, P., Strategy Formulation and Implementation. Cincinnati, OH: Southwestern Publishing Co., 1994.
- Shrivastava, P., A. Huff and J. Dutton (Eds). Advances in Strategic Management, Vol. 10. 1994, Greenwich CT.: JAI Press.
- Shrivastava, P., and C. Stubbart, Advances in Strategic Management, Vol 12 (A & B), (Challenges from Outside the Mainstream, Challenges Within the Mainstream), Greenwich CT: JAI Press, 1995.
- Shrivastava, P., Greening Business: Profiting the Corporation and the environment. Cincinnati, OH: Thomson Executive Press, 1996.
- Shrivastava, P., A. Huff and J. Dutton (Series Eds). Advances in Strategic Management: Organizational Learning and Strategic Management, Vol. 14. 1997, Greenwich CT.: JAI Press.
- Timo Busch and P. Shrivastava, Corporate Strategies for Global Climate Change, Greenleaf Publishers, London, 2011.
- Paul Shrivastava and Matt Statler, Learning from the Global Financial Crisis: Sustainably, Reliably, Creatively. Stanford University Press, Palo Alto CA, 2011.
- Alfred Marcus, Paul Shrivastava, Sanjay Sharma, and Stefano Pogutz (Eds), Cross Sector Leadership for the Green Economy, Palgrave Macmillan, New York, 2012.
