= Earth Summits =

Decennial meetings of world leaders

The Earth Summits are decennial meetings of world leaders, organized since 1972 with help of the United Nations, to help defining ways to stimulate sustainable development at the global level. The aim is to bring together the best individuals and organisations humanity can bring forward from all kind of categories of life, to identify and update what are humanity's most pressing challenges, to quantify them, identify solutions and develop a plan of action not to run into a wall. This plan of action is called Agenda 21 and implemented by many local governments under the name Local Agenda 21. The plan of action is designed as a TQM - Total Quality Manual, designed smartly and open enough, so that also organisations, companies and individuals can use it as a basis for their own plan of action and guidance not to miss out on important issue; it helps speed up understanding and identifying partners by e.g. using similar wordings and symbols. The 2000-2015 Millennium Development Goals and the 2015-2030 Global Goals are results from these Earth Summits. The first summit took place in Rio de Janeiro (Brazil) in 1992 . Last Earth Summit, called Rio+20, also took place in Rio de Janeiro in 2012.

Evidence of the development of a global culture of respect for the environment, the Earth Summits are symbolically very important as - together with the United Nations ObservancesCalendar - they aim to demonstrate the collective capacity to manage, address and bring attention to humanity's most pressing challenges, global problems and affirm the need to respect ecological constraints. The 2 summit gave birth to the United Nations Environment Program (UNEP), while the 1992 Summit launched the United Nations Framework Convention on Climate Change (UNFCCC), whose signatory countries have met annually since 1995.

== Procedure ==
The entry into force of an international treaty usually takes several years. This is a complex process as each country needs to complete two steps to join: signing the treaty, and then ratifying it formally. The treaty enters into force only when a sufficient number of countries have ratified it (the number varies from one treaty to another).

The signatory countries of this type of treaty organize, roughly once a year, a conference of the parties (COP). Before each conference there is a preparatory meeting called the Subsidiary Body on Scientific, Technical and Technological Advice (SBSTTA) where governments negotiate the technical details of the treaty. The process is similar for the Earth Summit, which includes a series of preparatory pre-conferences.

== List of Earth Summits ==
1. 1972 - The United Nations Conference on the Human Environment in Stockholm
2. 1982 - The 1982 Earth Summit in Nairobi (Kenya). An Earth Summit was held in Nairobi, Kenya, from 10 to 18 May 1982. The disinterest of US President Ronald Reagan (who appointed his delegated daughter Of the United States) made this summit a failure. Now no longer admitted by the United Nations as an official Earth Summit
3. 1992 - The United Nations Conference on Environment and Development (UNCED) or Earth Summit in Rio de Janeiro (Brazil)
4. 2002 - The World Summit on Sustainable Development, Earth Summit 2002 or Rio+10, Johannesburg (South Africa)
5. 2009 - 2009 United Nations Climate Change Conference or Copenhagen Summit, Copenhagen (Denmark)
6. 2012 - The United Nations Conference on Sustainable Development (UNCSD) or Rio+20, Rio de Janeiro (Brazil)
7. 2018 - The 7th Digital Earth Summit 2018, DES-2018, on Digital Earth for Sustainable Development in Africa was to be held in El Jadida (Morocco), at the Faculty of Science, Chouaib Douakkali University from April 17–19, 2018
8. 2019 - The Santiago Climate Change Conference, featuring the 25th session of the Conference of the Parties (COP 25) to the United Nations Framework Convention for Climate Change (UNFCCC) and meetings of the UNFCCC subsidiary bodies, convened from 2nd to 13 December 2019.
9. 2022 - Stockholm

== See also ==
- Earth for All initiative
