= Aurelio Peccei =

Italian industrialist and philanthropist

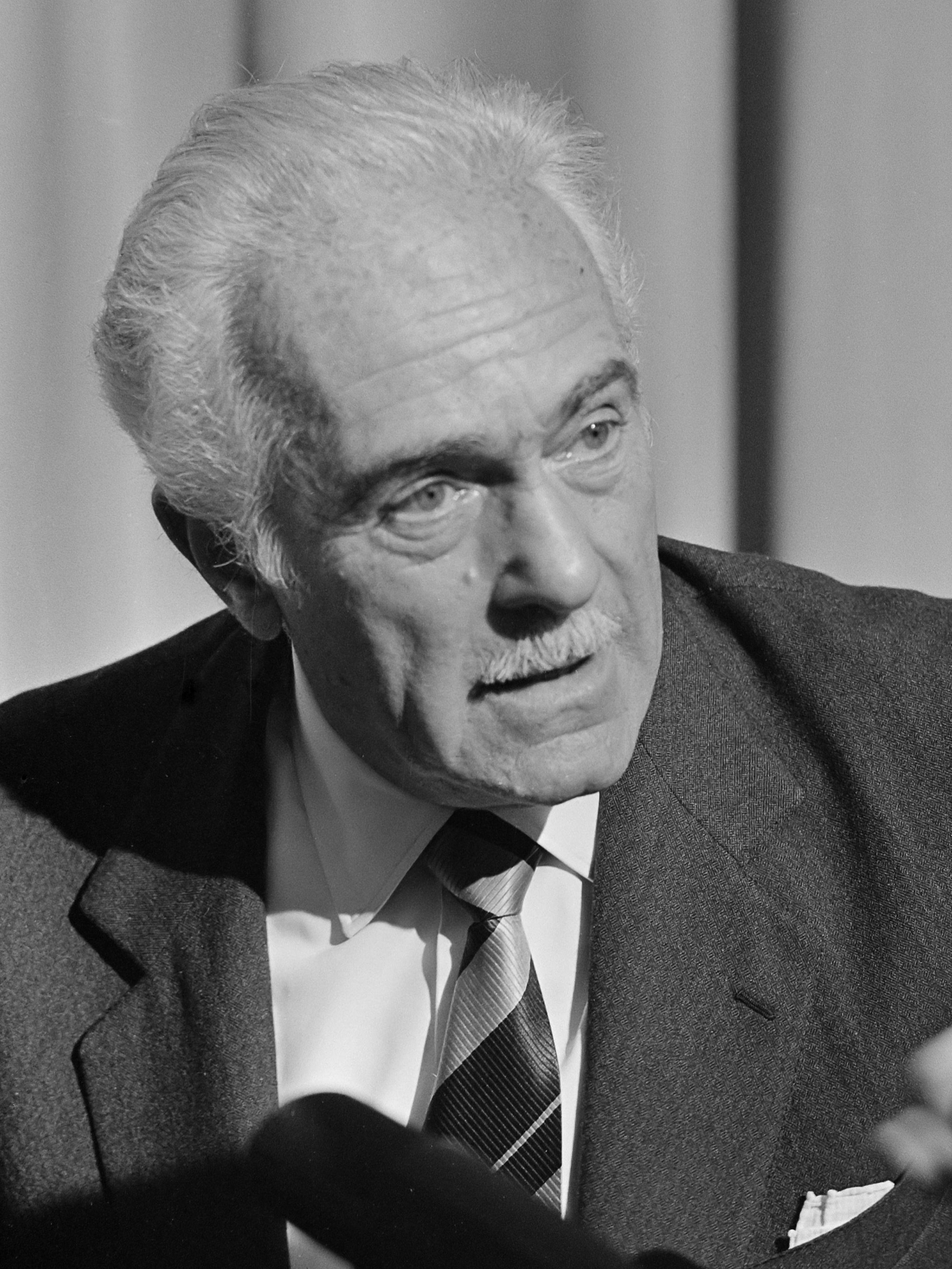
- Aurelio Peccei in 1976
- Born: July 4, 1908; Turin, Italy
- Died: March 14, 1984 (aged 75); Rome, Italy
- Occupation: Industrialist
- Known for: First president of the Club of Rome
- Spouse: Marisa Peccei
- Children: 3, Paola Sarmiento; Roberto Peccei; Riccardo Peccei

Aurelio Peccei (Italian pronunciation: [auˈrɛːljo petˈtʃɛi]; 4 July 1908 – 14 March 1984), was an Italian industrialist and philanthropist, who co-founded with Alexander King and first president of the Club of Rome, an organisation which, in 1972, produced The Limits to Growth report.

== Early life ==
Peccei was born on 4 July 1908 in Turin, the capital of the Piedmont region of Italy. He spent his youth there, eventually graduating from the University of Turin with a degree in economics in 1930. Soon thereafter he went to the Sorbonne with a scholarship and was awarded a free trip to the Soviet Union.

His knowledge of other languages brought him to Fiat S.p.A. Although under continual suspicion as an anti-fascist in the early 1930s, in 1935 a successful mission for Fiat in China established his position in Fiat management.

During World War II, Peccei joined the anti-fascist movement and the resistance, when he was a member of the "Giustizia e Libertà". He was arrested, imprisoned, and tortured. After 11 months in prison, he was freed in January 1945.

== Business ventures ==
After the war, Peccei was engaged in the rebuilding of Fiat. He was concurrently involved in various private and public efforts then underway to rebuild Italy, including the founding of Alitalia.

In 1949, he went to Latin America for Fiat, to restart their operations, as Fiat operations in Latin America had been halted during the war. He settled in Argentina, where he was to live for a decade with his family. He realised that it would make sense to start manufacturing locally and set up the Argentine subsidiary, Fiat-Concord, which built cars and tractors. Fiat-Concord rapidly became one of the most successful automotive firms in Latin America.

In 1958, with the backing of Fiat, Peccei founded Italconsult (a para-public joint consultancy venture involving major Italian firms such as Fiat, Innocenti, Montecatini), and became its chairman, a position he held until the 1970s when he became honorary president. Italconsult was an engineering and economic consulting group for developing countries. It operated under Peccei's leadership, on the whole, more as a non-profit consortium. Italconsult was regarded by Peccei as a way of helping tackle the problems of the Third World, which he had come to know first-hand in Latin America.

In 1964, Peccei was asked to become president of Olivetti. Olivetti was facing significant difficulties at that time due to the profound changes occurring in the office machine sector. Peccei, with his foresight and his entrepreneurial vision, was able to turn the situation at Olivetti around.

But Peccei was not content merely with the substantial achievements of Italconsult, or his responsibilities as president of Olivetti, and threw his energies into other organisations as well, including ADELA, an international consortium of bankers aimed at supporting industrialisation in Latin America. He was asked to give the keynote speech in Spanish at the group's first meeting in 1965, which is when the series of coincidences leading to the creation of the Club of Rome began.

== The Club of Rome ==
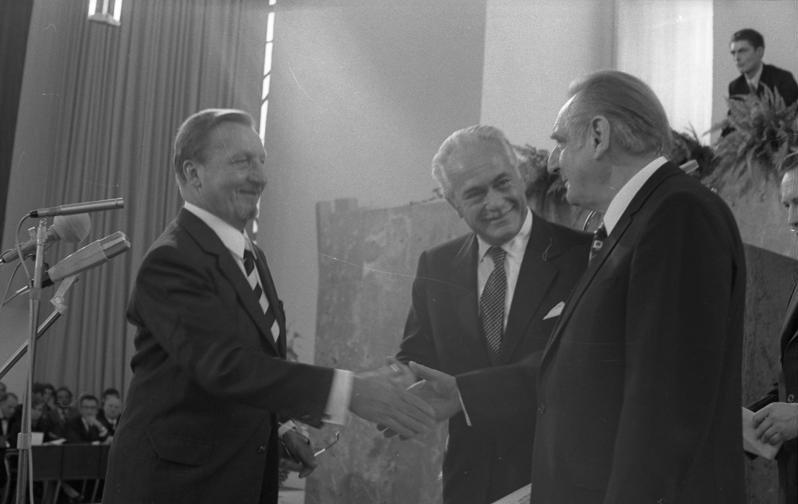
Aurelio Peccei (center), 1973

Peccei's speech caught the attention of Dean Rusk, then US Secretary of State, who had it translated into English and distributed at various meetings in Washington. A Soviet representative at the annual meeting of the United Nations Advisory Committee on Science and Technology (ACAST), Jermen Gvishiani, Alexei Kosygin's son-in-law and vice-chairman of the State Committee on Science and Technology of the Soviet Union, read the speech and was so taken by it that he decided he should invite the author to come for private discussions, outside Moscow. Gvishiani therefore asked an American colleague on ACAST, Carroll Wilson, about Peccei. Wilson did not know Peccei, but he and Gvishiani both knew Alexander King, by then Director General for Scientific Affairs for the Organization for Economic Co-operation and Development (OECD) in Paris, so Wilson appealed to him for information.

As it happened, King did not know Peccei, but he was equally impressed by the ADELA paper and tracked down its author via the Italian Embassy in Paris. King wrote to Peccei, passing on Gvishiani's address and his wish to invite him to the Soviet Union, but also congratulating him on his paper and suggesting that they might meet sometime as they obviously shared similar concerns. Peccei telephoned King and they arranged to have lunch.

The two men got on well from the outset. They met several times in the latter part of 1967 and early 1968, and then decided that they had to do something constructive to encourage longer-range thinking among Western European governments.

Peccei accordingly persuaded the Agnelli Foundation to fund a two-day brainstorming meeting on 7–8 April 1968 of around 30 European economists and scientists at the Accademia dei Lincei in Rome. The goal of the meeting was to discuss the ideas of Peccei and King on the global problems facing mankind and of the necessity of acting at the global level. The meeting at the Accademia dei Lincei was not a success, partly due to the difficulty of the participants to focus on a distant future.

After the meeting there was an informal gathering of a few people in Peccei's home, which included Erich Jantsch (one of the great methodologists of planning studies), Alexander King, Hugo Thiemann, Lauro Gomes-Filho, Jean Saint-Geours, and Max Kohnstamm. According to King, within an hour they had decided to call themselves the Club of Rome and had defined the three major concepts that have formed the club's thinking ever since: a global perspective, the long-term, and the cluster of intertwined problems they called "the problematique". Although the Rome meeting had been convened with just Western Europe in mind, the group realised that they were dealing with problems of much larger scale and complexity—in short, "the predicament of mankind". The notion of problematique excited some because it seemed applicable at a universal level, but worried others, who felt that the approach was valid only for smaller entities such as a city or community. Saint-Geours and Kohnstamm therefore soon dropped out, leaving the others to pursue their informal programme of learning and debate.

Thus started what Peccei called "the adventure of the spirit". He was fond of stating that, "If the Club of Rome has any merit, it is that of having been the first to rebel against the suicidal ignorance of the human condition." Peccei felt "It is not impossible to foster a human revolution capable of changing our present course."

About the same time, a study at the Massachusetts Institute of Technology (MIT), headed by Jay Forrester, began on the implications of continued growth on population increase, agricultural production, non-renewable resource depletion, industrial output, and pollution generation. He made an offer to the Club of Rome to adapt his dynamic model to handle global issues. A fortnight later, a group of club members visited Forrester at MIT and were convinced that the model could be made to work for the kind of global problems which interested the club. The results of the study were published in the 1972 book The Limits to Growth, which received both worldwide acclaim and strong criticism.

In 1972, Peccei was one of the principal founders of the International Institute for Applied Systems Analysis (IIASA), in Laxenburg, Austria. This institute was formed after considerable struggle, but then served as an important bridge between East and West, partly because its founders included the United States (through the National Academy of Sciences), the Soviet Union (through the Soviet Academy of Sciences), Italy (through the Comitato Nazionale di Ricerche) and various other countries in the Western and Eastern sectors of the world. IIASA became a meeting place for scholars and scientists of different countries and provided a bridging function for the scientific world, producing important studies in different fields, including climate change, energy, and agriculture.

It was during this same period that Peccei became involved in the World Wildlife Fund (now the World Wide Fund for Nature), becoming a member of its international board and becoming a strong supporter of their mission, not only internationally but also locally in Italy.

In the early 1970s, several other studies were undertaken to improve upon The Limits to Growth, with varying degrees of support from the Club of Rome. Reflecting general criticism from the Third World, a Latin American model was developed by the Bariloche Institute in Argentina. The Club of Rome helped to find funding for the project but did not give its imprimatur to the final report ("Catastrophe or New Society?", A.O. Herrera et al., 1976).

With the idea of placing greater stress on the human dimension, Peccei approached the Dutch economist and Nobel laureate Jan Tinbergen and proposed a study of the likely impact of a doubling of the population on the global community. Tinbergen and his colleague Hans Linnemann came to the conclusion that the topic was unmanageably large and decided to focus on the problems of food for a doubling world population. When this was put to the Club of Rome, Peccei and others disagreed strongly, feeling that other aspects such as strains on housing, urban infrastructure, and employment should not be ignored. Ultimately Linnemann and his group pursued their research with funds they had already raised in the Netherlands and published their results independently, not as a report to the Club of Rome.

In that same month, OPEC met, resulting in the first oil shock of 1973. The framework of discussion changed radically, at least for a while, and the club was to become involved in the United Nations debate on the New International Economic Order (NIEO).

Peccei persuaded the Austrian Chancellor, Bruno Kreisky, to host a meeting on north–south problems in February 1974 in Salzburg, Austria. Besides Bruno Kreisky, the following heads of state of government were present in Salzburg: Leopold Senghor, President of Senegal; Luis Echeverría, President of Mexico; Joop den Uyl, Prime Minister of the Netherlands; Olof Palme, Prime Minister of Sweden; Pierre Trudeau, Prime Minister of Canada; as well as the representatives of the prime ministers of Algeria and Ireland. Peccei deliberately did not invite any of the major European powers, the US, or the Soviet Union so as to prevent the debate turning into a forum for national or ideological position statements. To encourage the participants to speak freely, they were asked to come without accompanying civil servants and assured that nothing they said would be attributed to them. The two-day private brainstorming meeting ended with a press conference for 300 journalists.

As a logical extension of the Salzburg meeting, Peccei asked Jan Tinbergen to produce a follow-up report on global food and development policies, exploring these aspects much more thoroughly than the coverage in The Limits to Growth. Scholars from the First, Second and Third Worlds were invited to participate in the RIO project (Reshaping the International Order), though only Poland and Bulgaria accepted from the Communist bloc. The basic thesis was that the gap between rich and poor countries (with the wealthiest roughly 13 times richer than the poorest) was intolerable and the situation was inherently unstable, and that ways should be found to reduce the gap to 6:1 over the next 15 to 30 years. Unlike The Limits to Growth, the model allowed the developing countries five percent growth per annum, whereas the industrialised countries would have zero or negative growth. According to the report, all would benefit from more sensible use of energy and other resources and a more equitable distribution of global wealth. The main report argued that people in the rich countries would have to change their patterns of consumption and accept lower profits, but a dissenting group saw consumption as a symptom rather than a cause of the problems, which stemmed from the fundamental power structure.

After numerous working sessions and presentations over an 18-month period, the final results of RIO were presented at a meeting in Algiers in October 1976 and accepted as a report to the Club of Rome. The report did not have the hoped-for impact.

The last meeting Peccei organized and participated in was in Bogotá, Colombia, on 15–17 December 1983, with the title "Development in a World of Peace". Co-organizer of the meeting with Peccei was the President of Colombia, Belisario Betancur. Peccei visited Las Gaviotas in the Vichada and endorsed the project of Paolo Lugari to regenerate the rainforest that was destroyed by decades of extensive cattle farming.

== Death and legacy ==
Peccei died on 14 March 1984 in Rome.

A biography was written by his long-time assistant, Gunter Pauli entitled, Crusader for the Future: A Portrait of Aurelio Peccei. It was published in 1987.

== Works ==
Peccei wrote several books, including:

- The Chasm Ahead, Macmillan, NY (1969), ISBN 0-02-595360-5
- The Human Quality, Pergamon Press (1977), ISBN 0-08-021479-7
- One Hundred Pages for the Future, Pergamon Press (1981), ISBN 0-08-028110-9
- Before it is Too Late: A Dialogue with Daisaku Ikeda, I.B. Tauris (2008), ISBN 978-1845118884
