= Mihajlo D. Mesarovic =

Serbian scientist (born 1928)

Mihajlo D. Mesarovic (Serbian Latin: Mihajlo D. Mesarović, Serbian Cyrillic: Михајло Д. Месаровић; born 2 July 1928) is a Serbian scientist, who is a professor of Systems Engineering and Mathematics at Case Western Reserve University. Mesarovic has been a pioneer in the field of systems theory, he was UNESCO Scientific Advisor on Global change and also a member of the Club of Rome.

== Biography ==
Mihajlo D. Mesarović was born on 2 July 1928, in Zrenjanin, Yugoslavia. He was awarded the B.S. from the University of Belgrade Faculty of Electrical Engineering in 1951. In 1955 he received a Ph.D. in Technical sciences from the Serbian Academy of Sciences and Arts.

From 1951 to 1955, Mesarović was a research assistant at the Nikola Tesla Institute in Belgrade. From 1955 to 1958 he was head of the inspection department of the Institute. At the same time, Mesarović held academic positions at the University of Belgrade, Yugoslavia from 1954 to 1958. In 1958 he became a professor at the Massachusetts Institute of Technology / USA (MIT), where he served until 1959. He was an associate professor at Case Western Reserve University from 1959 to 1964 and professor from 1964 to 1978. In that time he was head of the Systems Engineering Group 1965–68, head of the Systems Engineering Department 1968-72 and director of the Systems Research Center 1968–78. Starting 1978, Prof. Mesarović has been the Cady Staley Professor of Systems Engineering and Mathematics. One of his students was Roger W. Brockett.

He has lectured in more than 60 countries, advised government officials on a variety of issues, consulted for international organizations, and published widely. He was also the founder of the 'Mathematical Theory of General Systems' Journal, Springer Verlag.

In 1999, he was appointed a Scientific Advisor on Global Change by Federico Mayor, Director-General of UNESCO. In that role, Mesarović travelled to UNESCO's headquarters in Paris and advised the director general's office on issues such as climate change, economics, population, technology transfer, and the education of women in developing countries.

In 2005 he was awarded the Hovorka Prize from Case Western Reserve University for exceptional achievements. In 2005 he was awarded the USA Club of Rome Lifetime Achievement Award at the United Nations.

== Work ==
His research interests include areas and topics like complexity, complex systems theory, global change and sustainable human development, hierarchical systems, large-scale systems theory, mathematical theory of general systems, multi-level systems, systems biology, and world and regional modelling. In the field of mathematics he is considered to be the founder of:

- Mathematical theory of coordination
- Multi-level Hierarchical Systems Developer,
- Negotiation Support Software System

== Publications ==
Mesarovic published several books and numerous articles. A selection:

- 1960. Multi-variable Control Systems. MIT Press.
- 1962. General Systems Theory and Systems Research Contrasting Conceptions of Systems Science. (ed.) Proceedings from the Second System Symposium.
- 1964. Foundations for a General Systems Theory. (ed.)
- 1968. Systems Theory and Biology. (ed.). Springer Verlag.
- 1970. Non-Numerical Problem Solving. with R. Banerji (ed.), Springer Verlag, 1970.
- 1970. Theory of Multi-level Hierarchical Systems. With D. Macko and Yasuhiko Takahara. Academic Press.
- 1972. Mathematical Theory of General Systems. With Y. Takahara. Academic Press.
- 1972. Organization Structure: Cybernetic Systems Foundation. IFSR Int’l. Series on Systems Science and Engineering, Vol. 22. Kluwer, Academic Publishers.
- 1972. Systems Approach and the City. Edited with Arnold Reisman. North Holland Publishing Co., Amsterdam.
- 1974. Mankind at the Turning Point, Second Report to the Club of Rome, co-authored with Eduard Pestel. Dutton, reviewed with summaries of chapters.
- 1975. General Systems Theory: Mathematical Foundations. With Yasuhiko Takaraha.
- 1994. Abstract Systems Theory, Springer

Articles:

- 1996. "Cybernetics of global change: human dimension and managing of complexity". With David L. McGinnis and A. West Dalton. UNESCO MOST policy papers 3, 43 p.

== See also ==
- Club of Rome
- Foundation for the Rights of Future Generations
- Systems biology
- Ladislaus Bortkiewicz
