= John N. Warfield =

American systems scientist

John Nelson Warfield (November 21, 1925 – November 17, 2009) was an American systems scientist, who was professor and director of the Institute for Advanced Study in the Integrative Sciences (IASIS) at George Mason University, and president of the Systems, Man, and Cybernetics Society.

== Biography ==
Warfield was born November 21, 1925, and grew up in Missouri, and studied at the University of Missouri in Columbia. Originally he majored in chemistry and minored in mathematics, but his studies were interrupted by World War II. After basic training in the U. S. Army Infantry, the Army put him in a specialized training program to study electrical engineering, which he found very interesting, especially electronics and communications. After the war he completed his original undergraduate program and continued on to get advanced degrees in electrical engineering. He received the Bachelor of Arts in 1948, Bachelor of Science in Electrical Engineering in 1948, and Master of Science in Electrical Engineering in 1949 from the University of Missouri, Columbia, Missouri. He received the Doctor of Philosophy degree from Purdue University, West Lafayette, Indiana, in 1952. His major was electrical engineering with a specialty in communications engineering.

He gained about 10 years of industrial experience with the firms: Wilcox Electric Company, Battelle Memorial Institute, and Burroughs Corporation. His industrial experience included theoretical and experimental research, electronic development and reliability testing of navigational equipment for jet aircraft. His longest service in this group was with the Battelle Memorial Institute from 1968 to 1974, where he held the title Senior Research Leader. At Battelle, and later at Virginia and George Mason universities, he developed the sociotechnology of interpretive structural modeling (ISM) and developed interactive management in collaboration with Alexander Christakis from 1979 till 1989.

He was elected President of the Systems, Man, and Cybernetics Society of the Institute of Electrical and Electronics Engineers IEEE, and of the International Society for the Systems Sciences (formerly called the Society for General Systems Research). He served as Editor of the IEEE Transactions on Systems, Man, and Cybernetics from 1968 to 1971, and as founding Editor-in-Chief of the Pergamon journal Systems Research, during the period 1981–1990. Warfield was a member of the Academic Committee of the International Encyclopedia of Systems and Cybernetics.

He was a Life Fellow of the Institute of Electrical and Electronics Engineers, and holds that organization's Centennial Medal. He was a member of the Association for Integrative Studies, and in the Board of Governors of the International Society for Panetics.

In 2006 John N. Warfield was awarded the Joseph G. Wohl Award for Career Achievement at the 2006 annual meeting of the IEEE Systems, Man, and Cybernetics Society. This is the highest award given by the society, and is not awarded every year. He was awarded for his contributions to systems engineering concepts, methodology, design, education and management. Warfield was also awarded the IEEE Third Millennium Medal.

== Publications ==
Warfield was the author of more than 10 books and 100 papers. His books:

- 1958. Synthesis of Linear Communications Networks. with G. E. Knausenberger, New York: McGraw-Hill.
- 1959. Introduction to Electronic Analog Computers. Englewood Cliffs: Prentice-Hall.
- 1963. Principles of Logic Design. Boston: Ginn and Company.
- 1976. Societal Systems: Planning, Policy, and Complexity. New York: Wiley Interscience.
- 1990. A Science of Generic Design: Managing Complexity through Systems Design. Ames, IA: Iowa State University Press 1994.
- 1994. A Handbook of Interactive Management. With Roxana Cárdenas, Ames, IA: Iowa State University Press 1994.
- 2002. Understanding Complexity: Thought and Behavior. AJAR Publishing Company, Palm Harbor, FL.
- 2003. The Mathematics of Structure. AJAR Publishing Company, Palm Harbor, FL.
- 2006. An Introduction to Systems Sciences. World Scientific, Singapore

Articles, papers and monographs, a selection:

- 1956. Systems Engineering. United States Department of Commerce PB111801.
- 1957. "How to Improve Systems Engineering". Aeronautical Engineering Review, 16(7), July, 1957, 50–51.
- 1969. "What is System Planning?". With R.W. House, in: Automatica Vol. 5, 1969, pp. 151–157.
- 1972. A Unified Systems Engineering Concept. With J. D. Hill, et al., Columbus: Battelle Memorial Institute, Monograph No. 1, June, 1972.
- 1974. Structuring Complex Systems. Columbus: Battelle Memorial Institute Monograph No. 4, April, 1974
- 1987. "Dimensionality" with Alexander Christakis Systems Research 4, pp. 127–137
- 2003. "A Proposal for Systems Science". In: Systems Research and Behavioral Science, Vol. 20 (2003), pp. 507–520.
- 2003. "Autobiographical Retrospectives: Discovering Systems Science". In: International Journal of General Systems, December 2003 Vol 32 (6), pp. 525–563.

== See also ==
- One-page management system
