= Talaria projector =

Brand of video projector

Talaria was the brand name of a large-venue video projector from General Electric introduced in 1983.

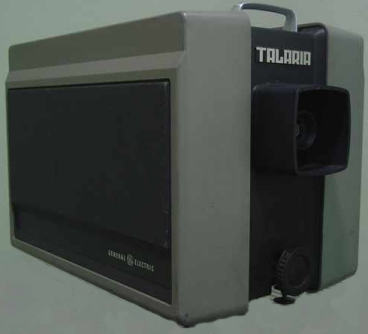
Early model GE Talaria light valve video projector.

Light from a Xenon arc lamp was modulated by a light valve consisting of a rotating glass disc that was continuously re-coated with a viscous oil. An electron beam similar to the one in a cathode ray tube traced a raster on the surface of the coated glass, deforming the surface of the oil. Where the oil was undisturbed, the light would be reflected into a light trap. The raster traced into the oil formed a diffraction grating.

The basic unit was monochrome (PJ7000 line). Color display is accomplished in one of two ways:

The single lens color projector (PJ5000 line) use dichroic filters to separate the white light of the xenon bulb in two channels, Green and Magenta.

RGB color separation and processing is obtained using vertical wobbulation of the electron beam on the oil film to modulate the green channel and sawtooth modulation is added to the horizontal sweep to separate and modulate Red and Blue channels. The optical system used in the Talaria line is a Schlieren optic like an Eidophor, but the color extraction is much more complex.

Two units (MLV) or three units (3LV) are stacked one atop the other, each one devoted to a single color (3LV).

In early models (PJ5000), the light source was a 650 watt xenon bulb (sealed beam) similar to the units in modern 35mm film projectors, and produced 250 lumens at a 75:1 contrast ratio. The later 3LV model produced as much as 3500 lumens at a 250:1 contrast ratio.

The later LV series had an optional "Multiple Personality" (MP) module that would allow the projector to display various resolutions and scan rates produced by computers of the time. It could produce an 8,000 lumen image onto a 15 foot by 20 foot screen from 64 feet away.

== See also ==
- Comparison of display technology
