= Gottfried Pestel =

German composer and organist

Gottfried Ernst Pestel originally Bestel(Berka 1654-1732) was a German composer and organist at Weida, Thuringia and Altenburg south of Leipzig. He was princely organist in the castle church from 1686-1732, after which he was succeeded by Christian Lorenz.

== Works, editions and recordings ==
- 17 organ preludes in the Mylauer-Tabulaturbuch
- Ciaconna (in Schneeberger Orgelbuch um 1705)
- Cantata Komm du schoene Freudenkrone (recording on collection by Sächsisches Vocalensemble, Batzdorfer Hofkapelle, directed Matthias Jung CPO 2009)
