= Academy of Management Journal =

- Logo
- Discipline: Management
- Language: English
- Edited by: Quinetta Roberson

Publication details
- Former name: Journal of the Academy of Management
- History: 1958–present
- Publisher: Academy of Management (United States)
- Frequency: Bimonthly
- Impact factor: 9.5 (2023)

Standard abbreviations
- ISO 4: Acad. Manag. J.

Indexing
- ISSN: 0001-4273 (print); 1948-0989 (web)
- LCCN: 58003817
- OCLC no.: 803928135

Links
- Journal homepage; Online access; Online archive

The Academy of Management Journal is a bimonthly peer-reviewed academic journal covering all aspects of management. It is published by the Academy of Management and was established in 1958 as the Journal of the Academy of Management, obtaining its current name in 1963.

According to the Journal Citation Reports, the journal has a 2023 impact factor of 9.5. It is also on the Financial Times list of 50 journals used to rank business schools and is one of the four general management journals that the University of Texas Dallas uses to rank the research productivity of universities. The current chief editor is Professor Quinetta Roberson (Michigan State University).
