= Eduard Pestel =

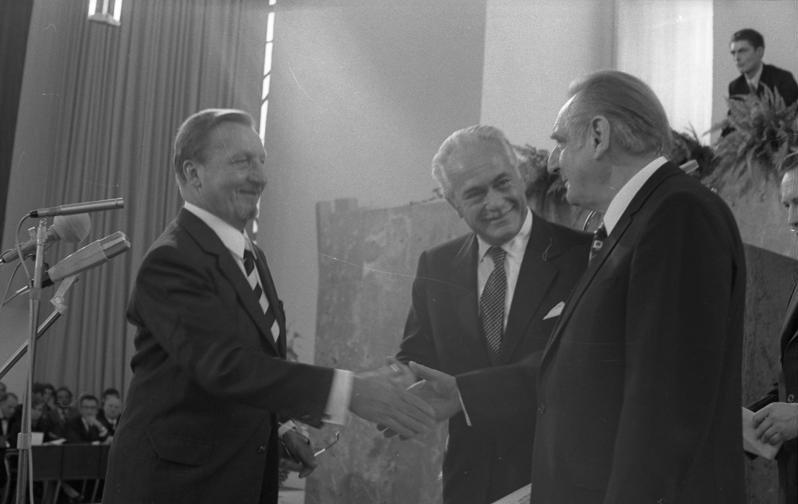
Eduard Pestel (rechts), 1973

Eduard Kurt Christian Pestel (29 May 1914 – 19 September 1988) was a German industrial designer, economist, professor of mechanics and politician who was born in Hildesheim and died in Hannover. He was coauthor with Mihajlo Mesarovic of Mankind at the turning point, the second report to the Club of Rome in 1974 which reviewed and greatly expanded the methodology and predictions of The Limits to Growth.

== Biography ==
After a three year study for bricklayer, Pestel received further education at the Fachhochschule in Hildesheim and from 1935 to 1938 at the Leibniz University Hannover and subsequently at Rensselaer Polytechnical Institute (RPI) in Troy, New York, where he received a master's degree in mechanical engineering.

While in Troy, he met Mary Jaqueline Evans, whom he married in early 1941. Because of the US-imposed Blockade, they were unable to go to Germany across the Atlantic and decided to take the Asian route across the USSR. After stopping briefly in San Francisco and Hawaii, they arrived in Japan in August 1941. Their intention was to stay there long enough for Jackie to give birth to their first son, Robert, and then catch the Trans Siberian Express out of Manchuria in the Spring of 1942. Before those plans could be carried out, however, Pearl Harbor happened on December 7th, sinking both the American Pacific war fleet and their hopes of returning to Europe anytime soon. In fact, they would be compelled, because of the war, to remain in Kobe until 1946. During that time, Pestel worked for an engineering firm in nearby Osaka, and supported his family —eventually three children including Robert (Susanne, b.1943, Wendy, b.1946).

At the end of the war, Pestel won commissions through his company to build 50,000 western toilets and refrigerators for the allied soldiers led by General MacArthur. Out of gratitude for Pestel’s efficient delivery of the products, General MacArthur granted his personal permission for Pestel’s family to be flown back to the States. The family arrived at Air-force headquarters in Dayton, Ohio where Pestel, a German national, was promptly detained and sent back to Germany. His wife and children stayed in Troy, NY for next three years, while Pestel continued his studies in Mechanical Engineering under Professor Flachsbart at the Technische Hochschule Hannover.

The continuing Atlantic Blockade prevented any family reunion until the Fall of 1949 after which Pestel's fourth child, Michael, was born in Germany in 1950. Pestel matriculated at the Hochschule in 1951 with a doctorate in mechanical engineering, and received his full Professorship of Mechanics at the Technische Hochschule Hannover (today Leibniz University Hannover) in 1956. Eduard and Jackie divorced in 1960.

From 1966 until his death in 1988, he was a member of the NATO Science Committee, and later a member of the Board of Trustees of the Volkswagen Foundation and Vice President of the Deutsche Forschungsgemeinschaft. In 1968 he was one of the founders of the Club of Rome. He also founded the German Association of the Club of Rome (DGCoR) in 1978, of which he was the first chair, a position he held until his death. In 1975, he founded the Institute for Applied Systems Analysis and Forecast (ISP), which was renamed in his honor as the Eduard Pestel Institute for Systems Research. Around that time, he also founded the chair of mechanics in the Faculty of Mechanical Engineering at the Technical University of Haifa (Technion) in Israel.

In Lower Saxony, he was Minister of Science and Arts from 1977 to 1981 as a member of the CDU Party. During this time, he worked on the restructuring of the German Technion Society founded by Albert Einstein in 1924, which had been banned during the Nazi era and fully restored by 1982. The Society promotes cooperation between Jewish and German scientists. Eduard Pestel was president of this society until his death.

In 1982, Pestel was awarded the Max Born Medal for Responsibility in Science. Pestel was married to Anneliese Ude-Pestel, an analytical psychotherapist and author.

== Publications ==
- 1963. Matrix methods in elastomechanics. With Frederick A. Leckie.
- 1968. Dynamics. With William T. Thomson.
- 1969. Statics . With William Tyrrell Thomson
- 1974. Multilevel computer model of world development system, April 29-May 3, 1974 : summary of the proceedings. Edited with M. Mesarovic.
- 1974. Mankind at the turning point. With Mihajlo Mesarovic.
- 1989. Beyond the Limits to growth : a report to the Club of Rome.
