= The First Global Revolution =

Book by Alexander King

- Cover of first edition (paperback)
- Author: Alexander King and Bertrand Schneider
- Cover artist: Fearn Cutler (1991 First Edition)
- Language: English
- Genre: Nonfiction
- Publisher: Pantheon Books
- Publication date: 1991
- Publication place: United States
- Media type: Print (hardback & paperback)
- Pages: 259 pp
- ISBN: 0-679-73825-8
- Preceded by: The Limits to Growth

The First Global Revolution is a book written by Alexander King and Bertrand Schneider, and published by Pantheon Books in 1991. The book follows up the earlier 1972 work-product from the Club of Rome titled The Limits to Growth. The book's subtitle is A report by the Council of the Club of Rome. The book was intended as a blueprint for the 21st century putting forward a strategy for world survival at the onset of what they called the world's first global revolution.

A second edition was published by Orient Longman in 1993 (ISBN 978-0001160323).

== Contents ==
- The Problematique

- The Whirlwind of Change
- Some Areas of Acute Concern
- The International Mismanagement of the World Economy
- Intimitations of Solidarity
- The Vacuum
- The Human Malaise
- Conclusion: The Challenge

- The Resolutique

- Introduction
- The Three Immediacies
- Governance and the Capacity to Govern
- Agents of the Resolutique
- Motivations and Values
- Learning Our Way Into a New Era

== Overview ==
The book is a blueprint for the twenty-first century at a time when the Club of Rome thought that the onset of the first global revolution was upon them. The authors saw the world coming into a global-scale societal revolution amid social, economic, technological, and cultural upheavals that started to push humanity into an unknown. The goal of the book was to outline a strategy for mobilizing the world's governments for environmental security and clean energy by purposefully converting the world from a military to a civil economy, tackling global warming and solving the energy problem, dealing with world poverty and disparities between the Northern Hemisphere and the Southern Hemisphere.

The book saw humankind at the center of the revolution centered on:

- Global economic growth
- New technologies
- Governments and the ability to govern
- Mass Media
- Global food security
- Water availability
- Environment
- Energy
- Population growth
- Learning systems
- Values/religions
- Materials

The product of a think tank, the book attempted to transcend the nation-state governance paradigm of the nineteenth-century and the twentieth-century and sought a way to eliminate some of the challenges seen inherent with those older systems of global governance. As such, it explored new and sometimes controversial viewpoints.

Can we live without enemies? Every state has been so used to classifying its neighbours as friend or foe, that the sudden absence of traditional adversaries has left governments and public opinion with a great void to fill. New enemies have to be identified, new strategies imagined, and new weapons devised.

[...]

In searching for a common enemy against whom we can unite, we came up with the idea that pollution, the threat of global warming, water shortages, famine and the like, would fit the bill. In their totality and their interactions these phenomena do constitute a common threat which must be confronted by everyone together. But in designating these dangers as the enemy, we fall into the trap, which we have already warned readers about, namely mistaking symptoms for causes. All these dangers are caused by human intervention in natural processes, and it is only through changed attitudes and behaviour that they can be overcome. The real enemy then is humanity itself.

== See also ==
- Politics of global warming
- United Nations Framework Convention on Climate Change and accompanying Kyoto Protocol (CO2 Regulations)
- Post–Kyoto Protocol negotiations on greenhouse gas emissions
- Green Climate Fund
