= Eidophor =

Type of television projector

Eidophor

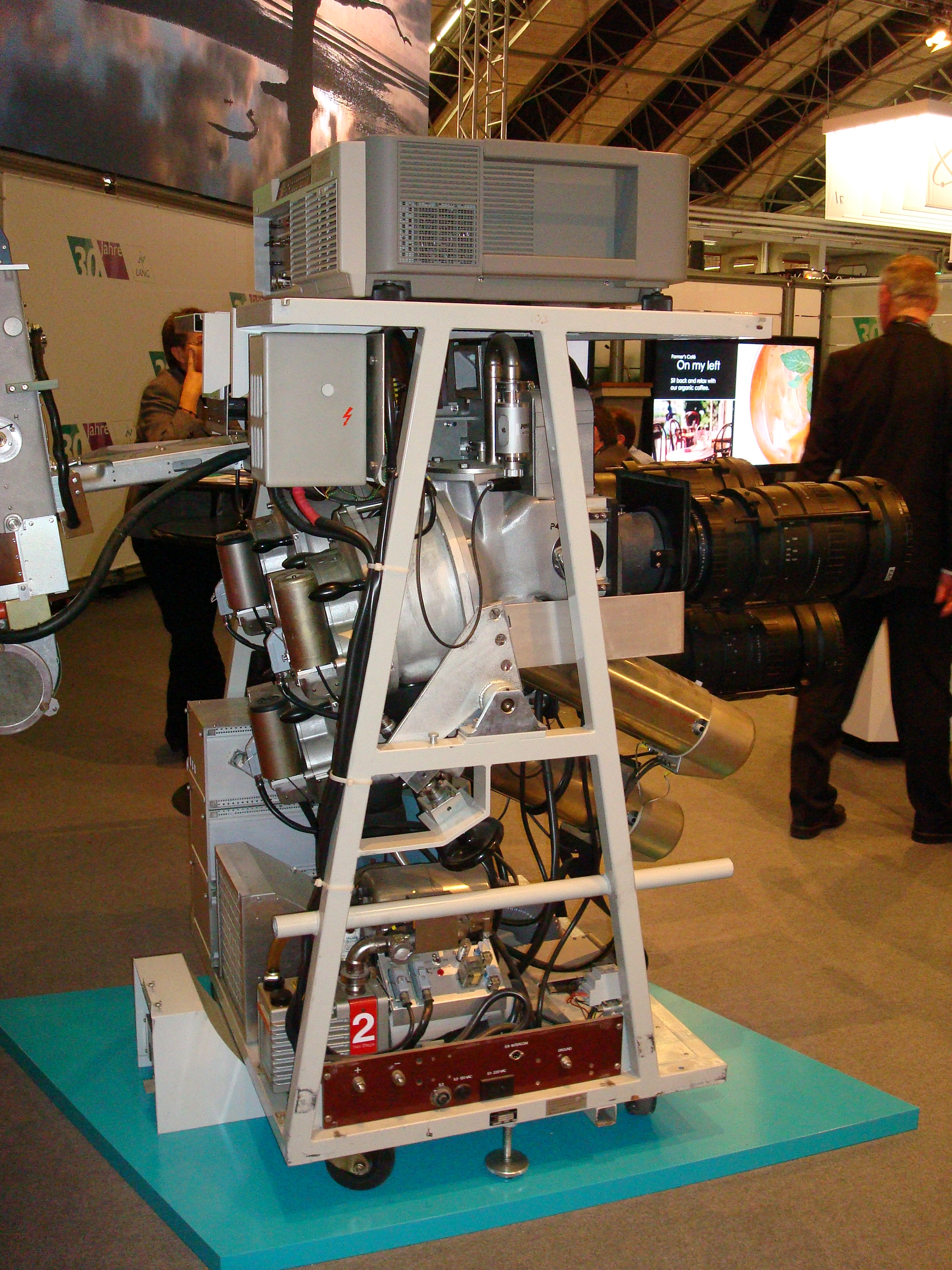
Side

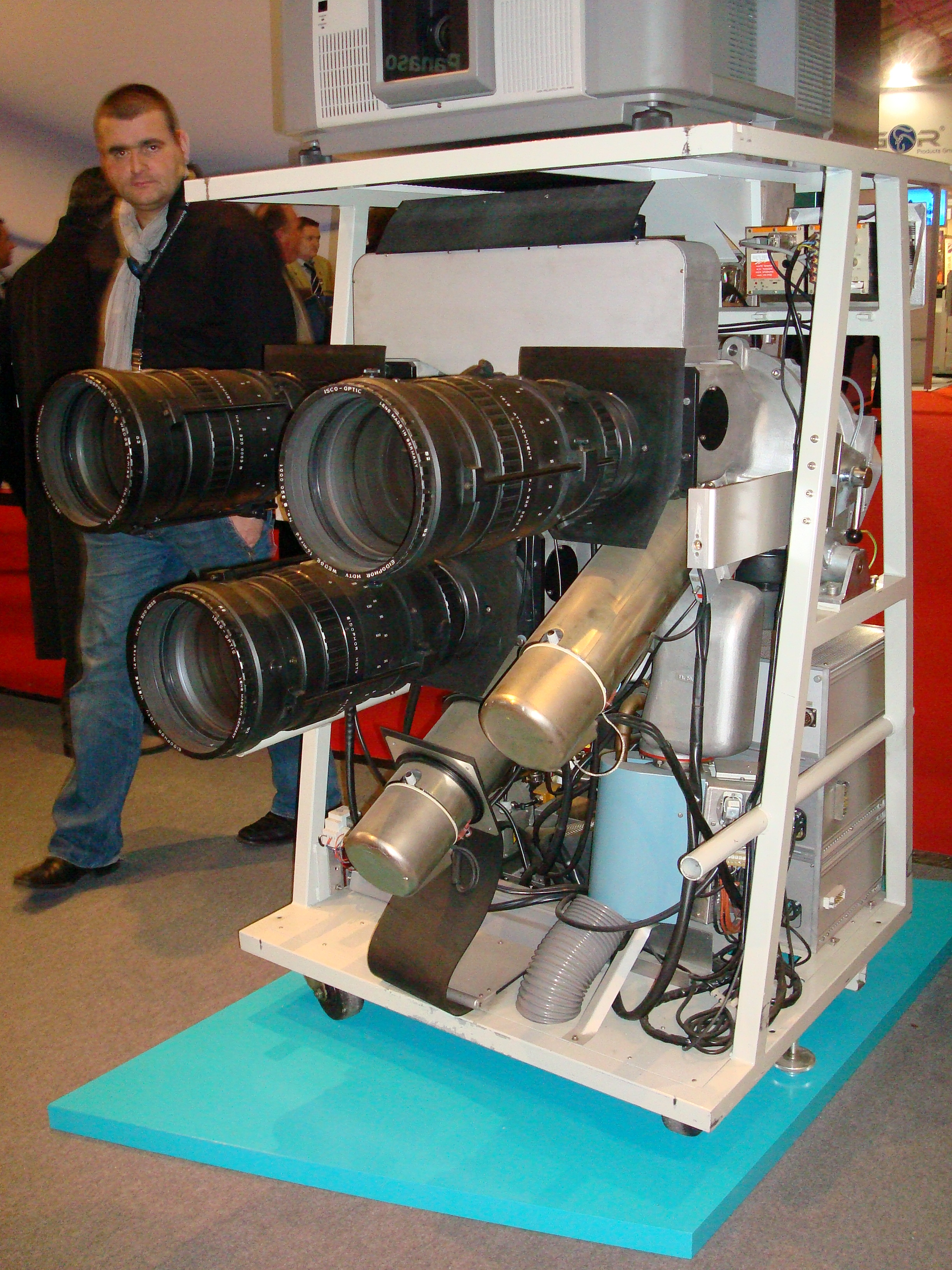
Front

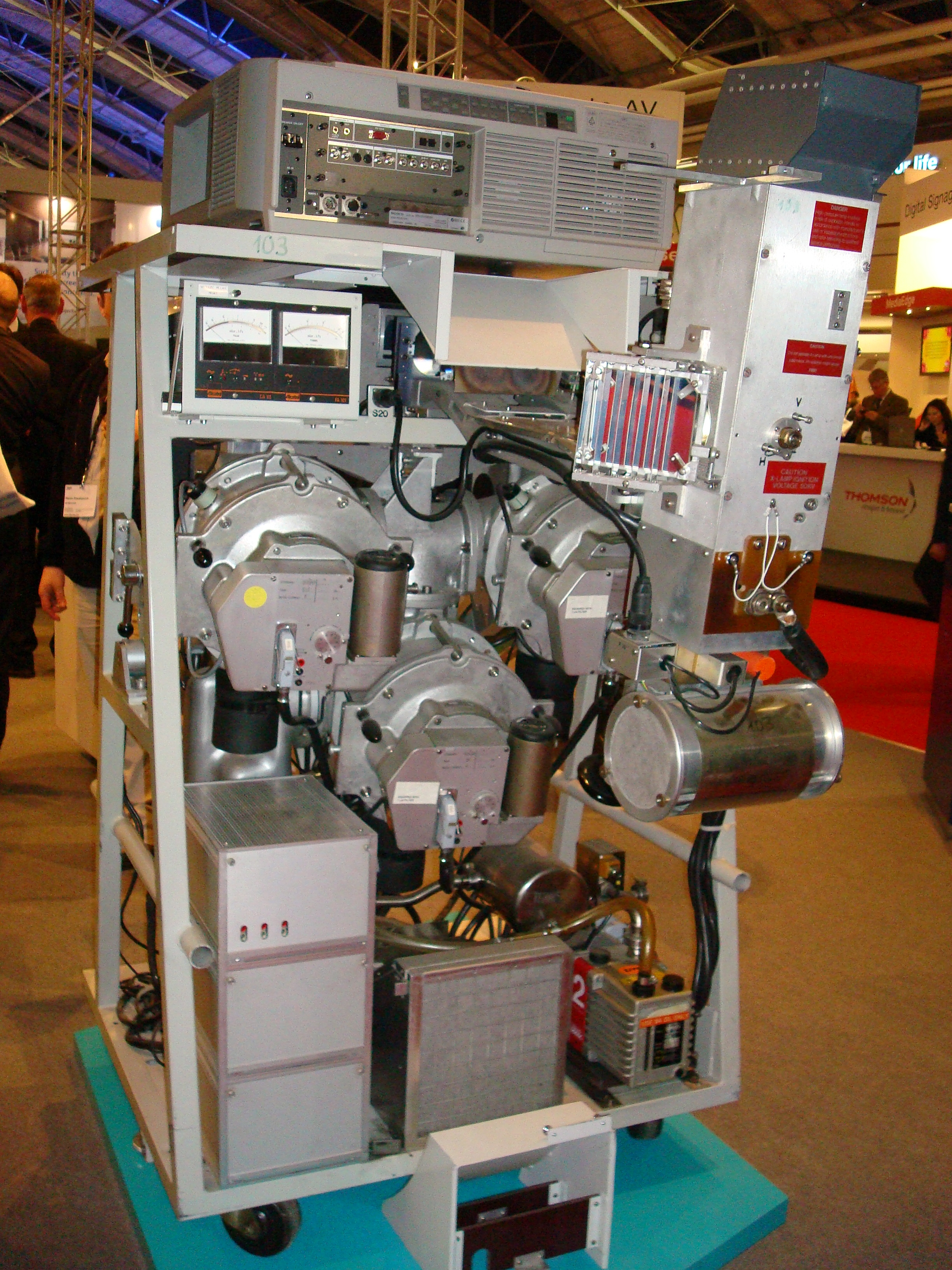
Back

An Eidophor was a video projector developed in the 1940s, used to create theater-sized images from an analog video signal. The name Eidophor is derived from the Greek word roots eido and phor meaning 'image' and 'bearer' (carrier). Its basic technology was the use of electrostatic charges to deform an oil surface.

== History and use ==
The idea for the original Eidophor was conceived in 1939 in Zürich by Swiss physicist Fritz Fischer, professor at the Labor für technische Physik of the Swiss Federal Institute of Technology, with the first prototype being unveiled in 1943. A basic patent was filed on November 8, 1939, in Switzerland and granted by the United States Patent and Trademark Office (patent no. 2,391,451) to Friederich Ernst Fischer for the Process and appliance for projecting television pictures on 25 December 1945. During the Second World War, Edgar Gretener worked together with Fischer at the Institute of Technical Physics to develop a prototype. When Gretener launched his own company Dr. Edgar Gretener AG in 1941 to develop enciphering equipment for the Swiss army, he stopped working on Eidophor. Hugo Thiemann took over this responsibility at the ETH. After six years of work on this project at the ETH, Thiemann moved together with the project to the company Dr. Edgar Gretener AG, which was licensed by the ETH to further develop Eidophor, following Fischer's death in 1947. An original August 1952 magazine article in the Radio and Television News credits the development of the Eidophor to Edgar Gretener.

Following the Second World War, a first demonstration of an Eidophor system as a cinema video projector was organized in the Cinema Theater REX in Zürich to successfully show a TV broadcast in April 1958. An even more promising perspective was the interest of Paramount Pictures and 20th Century Fox, which experimented with the concept of "theatre television", where television images would be broadcast onto cinema screens. Over 100 cinemas were set up for the project, which failed because of financial losses and the refusal of the U.S. Federal Communications Commission (FCC) to grant theatre owners their own UHF radio bands for presentation. Eidophors were not commonly used until there was a need for good-quality large-screen projection by the NASA space program, where the technology was deployed in mission control; they were also used in stadiums by touring music groups for live event visual amplification.

== Operation ==
The Eidophor used an optical system somewhat similar to a conventional movie projector, but substituted a slowly rotating mirrored disk or dish for the film. The disk was covered with a thin film of transparent high-viscosity oil, and through the use of a scanned electron beam, electrostatic charges could be deposited onto the oil, causing its surface to deform. Light was shone onto the disc by a striped mirror consisting of strips of reflective material alternating with transparent non-reflective areas. Areas of the oil unaffected by the electron beam would allow the light to be reflected directly back to the mirror and towards the light source, whereas light passing through deformed areas would be displaced and would pass through the adjacent transparent areas and onwards through the projection system. As the disk rotated, a doctor blade discharged and smoothed the ripples in the oil, readying it for re-use on another television frame.

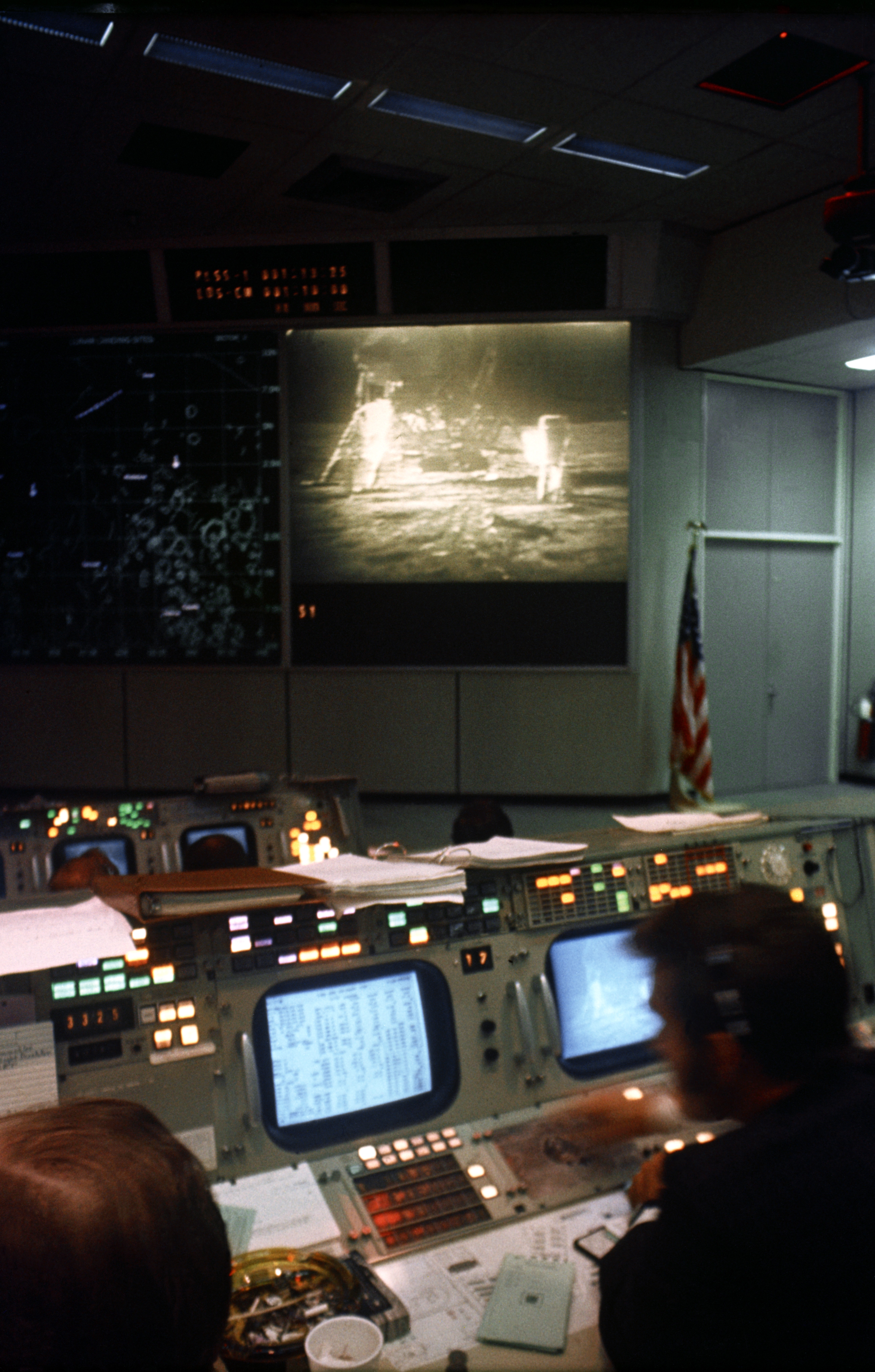
The Mission Control room in Houston featured Eidophor projection systems.

The Eidophor was a large and cumbersome device. It required a setup crew of at least two engineers, and three-phase AC power. Contamination of the oil bath would often cause visible artifacts to appear in the projected image. A rainbow-effect "eyebrow", or halo, surrounded the projected image.

Simple Eidophors produced black-and-white images. Later units used a color wheel (equivalent to the color television standard CBS tried to bring to the market against RCA/NBC's FCC-approved NTSC system, and today's DLP projection system) to produce red, green, and blue fields. The last models produced used separate red, green, and blue units in a single case. The Eidophor was 80 times brighter than CRT projectors of the time. The last Eidophors were able to project color images up to 18 meters wide.

== Eventual obsolescence ==
An early prototype of a new type of projector with limited resolution using a passive matrix-addressed liquid-crystal display was shown at a conference in San Francisco by Swiss engineer Peter J. Wild in 1972. The new devices, using active matrix addressing of LCDs were smaller and cheaper. While their projected images were not nearly as bright as those produced by the Eidophor, they were far cheaper to use. Advances in projection television technology in the 1990s brought about the end of the Eidophor. Current technologies include liquid-crystal display (LCD) and digital light processing (DLP) projectors, both of which produce superior results from easily portable devices.

== See also ==
- Comparison of display technology
- Talaria projector
- Telecinema
- Closed-circuit television
