= Hugo Thiemann =

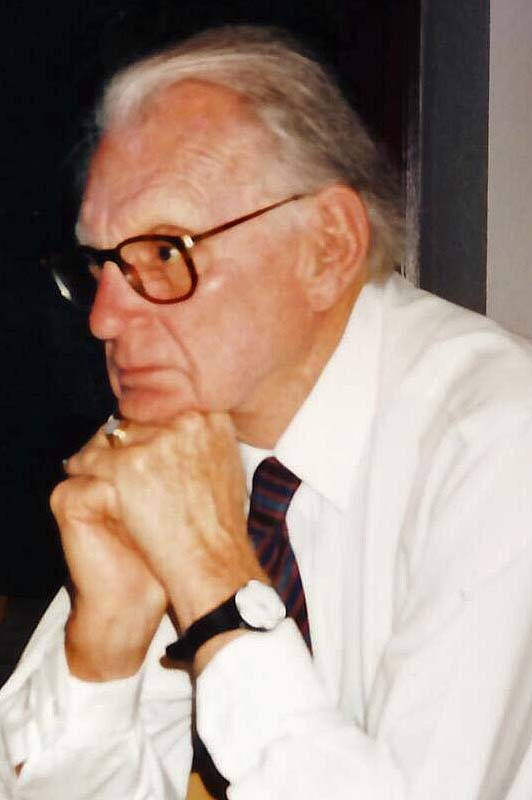
Thiemann in 1995

Hugo Thiemann (2 February 1917 – 10 June 2012) was a Swiss R&D manager and visionary. He was a founding member of the Club of Rome.

== Life ==
Hugo Ernst Thiemann was born in Heiden, Switzerland, then educated in nearby St. Gallen, Switzerland. He studied electrical engineering at the Swiss Federal Institute of Technology in Zurich (ETH Zurich), graduated in 1939 and got his PhD in 1947. There, he was assistant to Professor Fritz Fischer (physicist), known as the inventor of the Eidophor large-screen video projection system, at the Institute of Technical Physics. Thiemann was leading the Eidophor project from 1941 onwards.

He lost an eye during his education according to his autobiography (unpublished). In 1946 he married Marianne Beatrice Sturzenegger.

When the Eidophor project was transferred from the ETH to Dr. Edgar Gretener AG, a small Swiss company, he joined this company, which was founded by his former colleague Gretener. Later, Thiemann joined the European subsidiary of the Battelle Memorial Institute, Geneva, in 1953 and was its general manager for over 20 years. In 1974 he became general manager of Nestec SA, Vevey, Switzerland, charged with the coordination of all R&D in the Nestlé Group until 1985.

Although of German mother tongue, he spent most of his professional life together with his family in the French-speaking part of Switzerland, where he died at the age of 95.

== Achievements ==
After leaving academia, Thiemann was instrumental in industrializing and commercializing Eidophor while working for GRETAG, the successor company to Edgar Gretener AG. The new video projection system was demonstrated in the US. A potential application in cinemas was evaluated. After a lecture explaining the physics underlying the Eidophor system, Robert Oppenheimer offered him a position at the Institute for Advanced Study (IAS) in Princeton, NJ.

Instead, Thiemann decided to accept an offer from Battelle. He grew the newly founded European operations of the Battelle Memorial Institute, in French Institut Battelle Genève, to become a major industry-financed research institution with 750 employees at its peak. Among its international clients was Nestlé SA, the world-famous food company. In 1968 he became involved in the efforts of the Club of Rome as a participant of the inauguration meeting and then as a member of its executive committee. The Limits to Growth became a famous publication issued by this organization in 1972.

The top management of Nestlé became aware of the talents and knowledge of Thiemann during research contracts granted to Battelle. He was invited to join Nestlé in the capacity of general manager of Nestec SA, an R&D subsidiary of Nestlé, in order to conduct basic research and coordinate R&D in the divisions. In this capacity, he proved to be a visionary. He established the Rive Reine Conference, an annual gathering of Nestlé's top management with guests from industry, politics and finance. Among the new product sectors proposed by Thiemann was drinking water purification and distribution as well as the concept of Nespresso for ready-made premium coffee.

After retiring from his role at Nestlé he founded the Geneva Consulting & Management GC&M SA and remained its chairman until 1999.

== Honours ==
- The Institute of Electrical and Electronics Engineers elevated him to the grade of IEEE Fellow
- The Swiss Federal Institute of Technology in Lausanne honoured him with the title Dr. sc. tech. (honoris causa)
- The University of Geneva, Switzerland, granted him the title Dr. h.c. ès sc.
- Thiemann was an honorary member of the Club of Rome
