= Club of Rome =

Swiss-based think tank

The Club of Rome
- Founded: 1968 by Aurelio Peccei, Alexander King, Hasan Özbekhan and Alexander Christakis; Co-Presidents: Sandrine Dixson-Declève and Paul Shrivastava
- Type: Non-profit; NGO
- Location: Winterthur, Canton Zurich, Switzerland
- Fields: Global warming, well-being, humanitarian challenges
- Key people: Presidents: Paul Shrivastava; Silvia Zimmermann del Castillo
- Award: Friedenspreis des Deutschen Buchhandels (October 14, 1973)
- Website: ClubOfRome.org

The Club of Rome is a nonprofit, informal organization of intellectuals and business leaders whose goal is a critical discussion of pressing global issues. The Club of Rome was founded in 1968 at Accademia dei Lincei in Rome, Italy. At least until the early 2000s, the 'main club' has allegedly been limited to one hundred members, often selected from current and former heads of state and government, UN administrators, high-level politicians, diplomats, scientists, economists, and business leaders from around the globe. It stimulated considerable public attention in 1972 with the first report to the Club of Rome, The Limits to Growth. Since 1 July 2008, the organization has been based in Winterthur, Switzerland.

== History ==
=== Origins ===
In 1965, the Italian industrialist Aurelio Peccei gave a speech about the dramatic scientific and technological changes happening in the world. The speech was noticed by Alexander King, a British scientist who had advised the British government, and who was currently serving as Director-General for Scientific Affairs at the OECD. King arranged a meeting with Peccei. The pair shared a lack of confidence that the problems faced by the world could be solved by development and technological progress.

In April 1968, Peccei and King convened a small international group of people from the fields of academia, civil society, diplomacy, and industry met at Villa Farnesina in Rome. The background paper to set the tone of the meeting was entitled "A tentative framework for initiating system wide planning of world scope", by Austrian OECD consultant Erich Jantsch. However, the meeting was described as a "monumental flop", with discussions becoming bogged down in technical and semantic debates.

After the meeting, Peccei, King, Jantsch, and Hugo Thiemann decided to form the Club of Rome, named for the city of their meeting.

=== First steps ===
Central to the formation of the club was Peccei's concept of the problematic. It was his opinion that viewing the problems of humankind—environmental deterioration, poverty, endemic ill-health, urban blight, criminality—individually, in isolation or as "problems capable of being solved in their own terms", was doomed to failure. All are interrelated. "It is this generalized meta-problem (or meta-system of problems) which we have called and shall continue to call the 'problematic' that inheres in our situation."

In October 1968, the OECD held a symposium in Bellagio, Italy, in collaboration with the Rockefeller Foundation, at which several new members joined the club. The symposium focused on the dangers of exponential growth—which by its nature cannot continue forever—and ended with participants signing "The Bellagio Declaration on Planning", which emphasized the need to overcome global problems through coordination.

For a brief period, the club's ideas held sway within the OECD, thanks to King's efforts in promoting the group's work. When Secretary General Thorkil Kristensen formed a group of ten science and economic experts in 1969 to study problems for modern societies, four of the ten were members of the Club of Rome.

In 1970, Peccei's vision was laid out in a document written by Hasan Özbekhan, Erich Jantsch, and Alexander Christakis. Entitled, The Predicament of Mankind; Quest for Structured Responses to Growing Worldwide Complexities and Uncertainties: A PROPOSAL. The document would serve as the roadmap for the Limits to Growth project.

=== The Limits to Growth ===
The Club of Rome stimulated considerable public attention with the first report to the club, The Limits to Growth. Published in 1972, its computer simulations suggested that growth of production and consumption could not continue indefinitely because of either resource depletion or unmanageable levels of pollution. The 1973 oil crisis increased public concern about this problem. The report went on to sell 30 million copies in more than 30 languages, making it the best-selling environmental book in history.

Although the Club of Rome had enjoyed some influence at the OECD, their questioning of the value of growth "deepened the internal fractures within the OECD and provoked hostile reactions, leading to a revitalization of the strong pro-growth position." A 1973 booklet on the OECD's approach to environmental issues stated that the role of governments in "an acceptable human environment must now be developed in the framework of policies for economic growth". The OECD had given up on the Club of Rome, and set its course on a trajectory of unfettered growth.

=== 1974–present ===
Even before The Limits to Growth was published, Eduard Pestel and Mihajlo Mesarovic of Case Western Reserve University had begun work on a far more elaborate model (it distinguished ten world regions and involved 200,000 equations compared with 150 in the Meadows model). The research had the full support of the club and its final publication, Mankind at the Turning Point, was accepted as the official "second report" to the Club of Rome in 1974. In addition to providing a more refined regional breakdown, Pestel and Mesarovic had succeeded in integrating social as well as technical data. The second report revised the scenarios of the original Limits to Growth and gave a more optimistic prognosis for the future of the environment, noting that many of the factors involved were within human control and therefore that environmental and economic catastrophe were preventable or avoidable.

In 1991, the club published The First Global Revolution. It analyses the problems of humanity, calling these collectively or in essence the "problematique". It notes that, historically, social or political unity has normally been motivated by common enemies:

[...] Again, freedom fighters, despite tribal and ideological differences, were able to find unity and strengthened patriotism in the struggle for independence against their common enemy, the colonial powers. It would seem that men and women need a common motivation, namely a common adversary against whom they can organize themselves and act together. In the [late 20th century] vacuum such motivations seem to have ceased to exist – or have yet to be found.

The need for enemies seems to be a common historical factor. Some states have striven to overcome domestic failure and internal contradictions by blaming external enemies. The ploy of finding a scapegoat is as old as mankind itself—when things become too difficult at home, divert attention to adventure abroad. Bring the divided nation together to face an outside enemy, either a real one, or else one invented for the purpose. With the disappearance of the traditional enemy, the temptation is to use religious or ethnic minorities as scapegoats, especially those whose differences from the majority are disturbing.

Can we live without enemies? Every state has been so used to classifying its neighbours as friend or foe, that the sudden absence of traditional adversaries has left governments and public opinion with a great void to fill. New enemies have to be identified, new strategies imagined, and new weapons devised.
[...]
In searching for a common enemy against whom we can unite, we came up with the idea that pollution, the threat of global warming, water shortages, famine and the like, would fit the bill. In their totality and their interactions these phenomena do constitute a common threat which must be confronted by everyone together. But in designating these dangers as the enemy, we fall into the trap, which we have already warned readers about, namely mistaking symptoms for causes. All these dangers are caused by human intervention in natural processes, and it is only through changed attitudes and behaviour that they can be overcome. The real enemy then is humanity itself.

In 2001, the Club of Rome established a think tank, called tt30, consisting of about 30 men and women, ages 25–35. It aimed to identify problems in the world and suggest approaches to addressing them, from the perspective of youth.

In 2008, the club moved its headquarters from Hamburg to Winterthur in Switzerland.

In 2018, the Club of Rome appointed its first female co-presidents. The same year, co-presidents Ernst Ulrich von Weizsäcker and Anders Wijkman collaborated with over 30 members to publish "Come On! Capitalism, Short-termism, Population and the Destruction of the Planet". This publication advocated for profound changes in the interactions between governments, businesses, financial systems, innovators, and families to foster sustainable planetary stewardship.

== Organization ==
According to its website, the Club of Rome is composed of "notable scientists, economists, business leaders, high level civil servants and former heads of state from around the world."

The Club of Rome is a membership organization and has different membership categories. Full members engage in the research activities, projects, and contribute to decision-making processes during the club's annual general assembly. Of the full members, 12 are elected to form the executive committee, which sets the general direction and the agenda. Of the executive committee, two are elected as co-presidents. The secretary-general is appointed by the executive committee and is responsible for the day-to-day operation of the club. Aside from full members there are associate members, who participate in research and projects, but have no vote in the general assembly. The club has a satellite office in Brussels.

The club also has honorary members. Notable honorary members include Princess Beatrix of the Netherlands, Orio Giarini, Jean-Pascal van Ypersele, Fernando Henrique Cardoso, Mikhail Gorbachev, King Juan Carlos I of Spain, Horst Köhler, and Manmohan Singh.

== National associations ==
The club has national associations in 35 countries and territories. The mission of the national associations is to spread the ideas and vision in their respective countries, to offer solutions and to lobby for a more sustainable and just economy in their nations, and to support the international secretariat of the club with the organization of events, such as the annual general assembly.

== Current activities ==
As of 2025, there have been 55 reports to the club. These are internally reviewed studies commissioned by the executive committee, or suggested by a member or group of members, or by outside individuals and institutions. The most recent report, published in 2025, is titled "Enduring peace in the Anthropocene".

On 14 March 2019, the Club of Rome issued an official statement in support of Greta Thunberg and the school strikes for climate, urging governments across the world to respond to this call for action and cut global carbon emissions.

In 2020, the Earth4All initiative was launched at the UNFCCC Race-to-Zero Dialogues session on Transformational Leadership to explore potential transformational political and economic solutions for the 21st century. Led by the Club of Rome, the BI Norwegian Business School and the Potsdam Institute for Climate Impact Research, a group of researchers and policymakers assessed global risks and identified five pathways to catalyze transformation and systemic change towards sustainability: energy, food, poverty, inequality and population (including health and education). The results are published in the book "Earth for All" in 2022 alongside the 50th anniversary of the first Earth Summit in Stockholm and the initial publication of the Limits to Growth in 1972.

== Critics ==
From the 1970s, the Club of Rome attracted substantial criticism. Economist Robert Solow, recipient of a Nobel Memorial Prize in Economic Sciences, criticized The Limits to Growth (LTG) as having "simplistic" scenarios. He has also been a vocal critic of the Club of Rome. In 2002 he said that "the one thing that really annoys me is amateurs making absurd statements about economics, and I thought that the Club of Rome was nonsense. Not because natural resources or environmental necessities might not at some time pose a limit, not on growth, but on the level of economic activity—I didn't think that was a nonsensical idea—but because the Club of Rome was doing amateur dynamics without a license, without a proper qualification. And they were doing it badly, so I got steamed up about that." However, in 2009, Solow said that "I have not changed my mind about [the Club of Rome]... [But] Thirty years later, the situation may have changed. It is possible that real demands on natural resources, and therefore on the natural environment, will be dramatically different in a world in which India and China, and other countries, too, grow at 8 or 10 percent a year, and need to pass through the material-goods-intensive phase of growth before they arrive at the service economy... it will probably be more important in the future to deal intellectually, quantitatively, as well as practically, with the mutual interdependence of economic growth, natural resource availability, and environmental constraints."

An analysis of the world model used for The Limits to Growth in 1976 by mathematicians Vermeulen and De Jongh has shown it to be "very sensitive to small parameter variations" and having "dubious assumptions and approximations".

In 1973, an interdisciplinary team at Sussex University's Science Policy Research Unit reviewed the structure and assumptions of the models used and published their analysis in Models of Doom, finding that the forecasts of the world's future are very sensitive to a few unduly pessimistic key assumptions. The Sussex scientists also wrote that the Dennis Meadows et al. methods, data, and predictions were faulty, that their world models (and their Malthusian bias) did not accurately reflect reality.

Economist Thomas Sowell, in his 1995 book The Vision of the Anointed, describes economist John Kenneth Galbraith, biologist Paul R. Ehrlich, the Club of Rome and Worldwatch Institute as "the anointed", declaring that "they were utterly certain in their predictions, yet completely disproven empirically, though their reputations remained perfectly undamaged". According to the National Review, he describes them "promoters of a worldview concocted out of fantasy, impervious to any real-world considerations".

== Support ==
In contrast, John Scales Avery, a member of Nobel Peace Prize (1995) winning group associated with the Pugwash Conferences on Science and World Affairs, supported the basic thesis of The Limits to Growth by stating, "Although the specific predictions of resource availability in [The] Limits to Growth lacked accuracy, its basic thesis – that unlimited economic growth on a finite planet is impossible – was indisputably correct."

In 1980, United States president Jimmy Carter commissioned the Global 2000 Report to the President, which undertook a long-term global economic modelling exercise similar to the Club of Rome's research. The report arrived at similar conclusions regarding expected global resource scarcity, and the need for multilateral coordination to prepare for this situation.

Over the years, various studies have supported aspects of Club of Rome research. In 2008, a study by Graham Turner of the Australian research organisation CSIRO found that "30 years of historical data compare favorably with key features of a business-as-usual scenario called the "standard run" scenario, which results in collapse of the global system midway through the 21st century." In 2020, econometrician Gaya Herrington published a study in the Yale University's Journal of Industrial Ecology which concluded that all economic data since the 1970s was consistent with the World3 BAU scenario in Limits to Growth, which could mean that rapid degrowth would occur after 2040.

== Members ==
Category:Club of Rome members Past and present members are listed by the Club of Rome.

== See also ==
- Club of Madrid
- Club of Vienna
- Futures studies
- Chubu University
- World Academy of Art and Science
- Global catastrophic risk
- Harlan Cleveland – DIKW
- Latin American World Model
- Peak oil
- Pergamon Press
- Survivalism
- The First Global Revolution
- The Revenge of Gaia
