= Erich Jantsch =

Austrian astrophysicist

Jantsch, Erich
- Photographed for NW Mag in May 1972
- Born: 8 January 1929; Vienna, First Austrian Republic
- Died: 12 December 1980 (aged 51); Berkeley, California, U.S.

Erich Jantsch (8 January 1929 – 12 December 1980) was an Austrian system-theorist, philosopher, astrophysicist, engineer, educator, author, consultant and futurist, especially known for his work in the social systems design movement in Europe in the 1970s.

== Biography ==
Born in Vienna in 1929, Jantsch studied physics at the University of Vienna, where he obtained his doctorate in astrophysics in 1951. Subsequently, he did a post-doctorate study at the Indiana University Bloomington for another year.

Jantsch started his career as an astronomer at the University of Vienna, where he worked until 1957. In the mid-1950s, he emigrated to the United States, but did not receive his green card until 1979. He continued to work in Europe and United States. From 1957 to 1962 Jantsch worked as an engineer and physicist in Switzerland. In 1970 he was appointed Richard Merton Professor at the Technical University in Hanover, Germany.

Jantsch lectured widely in Europe, North and South America, the Near East and Japan. For example, he was a visiting lecturer of Planning and Research Planner of International Studies, University of California, Berkeley. In 1974, Jantsch stayed at the Villa Serbelloni in Bellagio, "where he was one of the first distinguished residents invited by the Rockefeller Foundation". He was also Research Associate at MIT, where he studied the future of MIT and the American University.

Jantsch was an advisor to twenty governments, several international organizations and research institutes. Among others he was "consultant to the Directorate of Scientific Development of the O.E.C.D. and as a member of the executive committee of the Club of Rome". As consultant to OECD (Organization of Economic Cooperation and Development); prepared studies on the world food problem, technological forecasting, higher education, etc. In 1971 he was the Austrian delegate to the first session of the UN Committee on Natural Resources.

For the last few years of his life, Jantsch was without a job and lived in an "apartment in Berkeley: dark and depressing room, with massage parlours above and below; a typewriter, a plant, and scattered copies of his favourite newspaper, Neue Zürcher Zeitung". It was here that he finished his last book, The Self-Organizing Universe. He made a living and supported his mother "by giving lectures all over the world, through writing, and by relying on a few friends".

Jantsch died on 12 December 1980 in Berkeley, California "after a short but painful illness". He had been "alone and lonely, abandoned by friends, misunderstood by colleagues". His ashes were scattered over the Pacific Ocean.

== Work ==
In the mid-1960s Jantsch's increasing concern regarding the future led him to study forecasting techniques. He did not believe that forecasting or science could be neutral.

=== The Self-Organizing Universe ===
Jantsch's Gauthier Lectures in System Science given in May 1979 at the University of California, Berkeley became the basis for his book The Self-Organizing Universe: Scientific and Human Implications of the Emerging Paradigm of Evolution, published by Pergamon Press in 1980 as part of the System Science and World Order Library edited by Ervin László. The book deals with self-organization as a unifying evolutionary paradigm that incorporates cosmology, biology, sociology, psychology, and consciousness. Jantsch is inspired by and draws on the work of Ilya Prigogine concerning dissipative structures and nonequilibrium states.

Now out of print for many years, The Self-organizing Universe has been influential in the interdisciplinary fields of biomimicry, holism, co-evolution, and self-organization. It was extensively cited in Ken Wilber's integral philosophy book Sex, Ecology, Spirituality: The Spirit of Evolution.

== Reception ==
Jantsch was described as "quiet and modest", but as an "original polymath and genius" by Ralph H. Abraham in "The Genesis of Complexity".

Magoroh Maruyama wrote in a eulogy:

Jantsch succumbed at the age of 51 to the material and physical hardships that worsened progressively during the last decade of his prolific and still young life. This makes us realize again the harsh and brutal conditions of life some of the innovators must endure. ... Let us face squarely the fact that Jantsch was given no paid academic job during a decade of his residence in Berkeley—a town considered to be a foremost spawning ground of scientific and philosophical innovations." Jantsch penned his own epitaph: "Erich Jantsch died on __ in Berkeley after a painful illness. He was almost 52 and grateful for a very rich, beautiful and complete life. His ashes have been scattered over the sea, the cradle of evolution."

Jantsch's Design for Evolution is described as "a seminal work on general evolution theory (GET)" by Ralph H. Abraham in "The Genesis of Complexity".

== Selected publications ==
Books:

- 1966: Technological Forecasting in Perspective, Working Document. DAS/SPR/66.12, Organization for Economic Cooperation and Development, Paris, France.
- 1967: Technological forecasting in perspective, OECD, 1967.
- 1968: Integrating Forecasting and Planning through a Function-Oriented Approach. Technological Forecasting for Industry and Government. Englewood Cliffs, NJ: Prentice-Hall.
- 1969: Perspectives of Planning.
- 1969: Integrative Planning for the" Joint Systems" of Society and Technology--The Emerging Role of the University.
- 1969: Adaptive institutions for shaping the future. Perspectives on Planning. Jantsch, E., ed. OECD, Paris.
- 1970: Science and Human Purpose.
- 1972: Technological planning and social futures, Wiley, 1972. ISBN 0-470-43997-1
- 1972: The futurists (Interview with E. Jantsch featured in this book) Toffler, A. (Ed.). (1972). New York: Random House.
- 1975: Design for Evolution: Self-Organization and Planning in the Life of Human Systems (The International Library of Systems Theory and Philosophy), George Braziller Inc, 1975. ISBN 0-8076-0758-4
- 1976: Introduction and summary. Evolution and Consciousness, Human Systems in Transition, Addison-Wesley Pubi., Reading, 1–8.
- 1976: Modes of Learning. Human Systems In Transition, edited by Frlch Jantsch and Conrad Waddington, MA: Addison-Wesley Publishing Company.
- 1976: Evolution and consciousness: Human systems in transition
- 1976: Evolution: Self-realization through self-transcendence.
- 1976: Evolving images of man: Dynamic guidance for the mankind process. E. Jantsch CH Waddington: Evolution and Consciousness-Human systems in Transition, Addison-Wesley.
- 1976: Evaluation and 36 Systems and Models Consciousness. Jantsch, E., & Waddington, C. H.
- 1976: Self Realisation Through Self Transcendence. Evolution and Consciousness.
- 1976: Self-transcendence: new light on the evolutionary paradigm.
- 1980: The Self-Organizing Universe: Scientific and Human Implications of the Emerging Paradigm of Evolution, New York: Pergamon Press, 1980. hardcover ISBN 0-08-024312-6 ; softcover ISBN 0-08-024311-8
- 1980: "The unifying paradigm behind autopoiesis, dissipative structures, hyper-and ultracycles". Autopoiesis, dissipative structures, and social orders. Westview Press, Boulder.
- 1980: "The evolutionary vision: Toward a unifying paradigm of physical, biological and sociological evolution".
- 1981: The Evolutionary Vision (Aaas Selected Symposium), Westview Press. ISBN 0-86531-140-4
- 1981: The Evolutionary Vision: Toward a Unifying Paradigm of Physical, Biological and Sociocultural Evolution. Boulder, CO: Westview Press, 1981.
- 1982: "From self-reference to self-transcendence: The evolution of self-organization dynamics". Self-organization and dissipative structure (University of Texas Press, Austin), 344353.

Articles, a selection:

- 1967: "Forecasting Future". Science Journal, 3(10), 40.
- 1968: "Technological forecasting for planning and its institutional implications". Ekistics, 26(153), 150–161.
- 1968: "Technological forecasting in corporate planning. Long Range Planning, 1(1), 40–50.
- 1969: "Integrative planning of society and technology: the emerging role of the university". Futures, 1(3), 185–190.
- 1969: "New organizational forms for forecasting. Technological Forecasting, 1(2), 151–161.
- 1969: "The organization of technological forecasting in the Soviet Union:: Notes from a brief visit". Technological Forecasting, 1(1), 83–86.
- 1969: "The chasm ahead". Futures, 1(4), 314–317.
- 1970: "Inter- and Transdisciplinary University: A Systems Approach to Education and Innovation", Policy Sciences, Vol. 1, No. 4 (Winter, 1970), pp. 403–42
- 1970: "From forecasting and planning to policy sciences", Policy Sciences, 1(1), 31–47.
- 1970: "Toward a methodology for systemic forecasting". Technological Forecasting, 1(4), 409–419.
- 1970: "Technological forecasting at national level in Japan:: Notes from a brief visit". Technological Forecasting, 1(3), 325–327.
- 1971: "The Planning of Change", in Policy Sciences.
- 1971: "World Corporation-Total Commitment". COLUMBIA JOURNAL OF WORLD BUSINESS, 6(3), 5–12.
- 1971: "World dynamics". Futures, 3(2), 162–169.
- 1972: "Education for design". Futures, 4(3), 232–255.
- 1972: "The organization of forecasting in Romania: Notes from a brief visit". Technological Forecasting and Social Change, 4(1), 19–22.
- 1972: "Towards interdisciplinarity and transdisciplinarity in education and innovation. Interdisciplinarity", Problems of Teaching and Research in Universities. OECD, Paris, 97–121.
- 1972: "Forecasting and the systems approach: A critical survey". Policy Sciences, 3(4), 475–498.
- 1973: "Enterprise and environment". Industrial Marketing Management, 2(2), 113–130.
- 1973: "Forecasting and systems approach: a frame of reference". Management Science, 19(12), 1355-1367.
- 1974: "Organising the human world: an evolutionary outlook". Futures, 6(1), 4–15.
- 1975: "The quest for absolute values." Futures, 7(6), 463–474.
- 1980: "Ethics and evolution." The North American Review, 14–18.'
- 1980: "Interdisciplinarity: Dreams and Reality". Prospects: Quarterly Review of Education, 10(3), 304–12.
- 1981: "Autopoiesis: A central aspect of dissipative self-organization". Zeleny, M. Autopoiesis: a theory of living organization. New York: North Holland, 65–88.
- 1981: "Unifying principles of evolution". In The Evolutionary Vision, 83–116.

See also his first biography by Leah H. Sciabarrasi, The Quiet Ganesh. Finding Erich Jantsch (Amazon 2023), ISBN 979-8378741885 (hardcover), 979-8378611034 (paperback).
