= Industrial ecology programme =

Industrial Ecology Programme
- Abbreviation: IndEcol
- Type: Programme
- Headquarters: Trondheim, Norway
- Region served: International
- Official language: English
- Director: Francesco Cherubini
- Website: https://www.ntnu.edu/web/indecol/industrial-ecology-programme

The Industrial Ecology Programme, or IndEcol, in the Department of Energy and Process Engineering at NTNU (Trondheim, Norway) is an interdisciplinary research programme specialising in sustainable development, circular economy research and environmental issues.

IndEcol's research areas are framed around the recently adopted United Nations Sustainable Development Goals and include:

- Ecosystems and Bioresources
- Energy, Transport and Buildings
- Circular Economy and Resources
- Sustainable Production and Consumption

Research groups focus on Life Cycle Assessment, Material Flow Analysis, and global environmental input-output analysis. The Digital Laboratory of the Programme bundles the Research software engineering efforts of the group.

The programme was initiated in 1994 and covers several research disciplines and a comprehensive educational curriculum. IndEcol established the world's first PhD programme in Industrial Ecology in 2003 and set up the international Master of Science in Industrial Ecology the following year.

The IndEcol group consists of Professors, Researchers, Post-Doctoral Fellows and PhD candidates, and currently numbers around 70 people. Current academics include Helge Brattebø, Anders Hammer Strømman, Daniel Müller, Richard Wood, Francesco Cherubini, Francesca Verones, Johan Berg Pettersen, and Edgar Hertwich. Cherubini was a contributing author for Working Group 3's Chapter 7 (Energy systems) and Chapter 11 (Agriculture, Forestry, and other Land Use) 5th Assessment Report for the Intergovernmental Panel on Climate Change (IPCC)

== Specialist programmes ==
The Industrial Ecology Programme at NTNU offers both PhD and Master’s study options

== Partnerships ==
IndEcol is the home of the NTNU SUSTAINABILITY office, which represents one of four Strategic Research Areas of NTNU .

IndEcol is also the home for the European Editorial Office of Journal of Industrial Ecology, a journal produced by Yale University for the International Society for Industrial Ecology.

== Selected recent publications ==
- List of publications by IndEcol generated by Scopus
- Vita., G., Lundström, J.R., Hertwich, E.G., Quist, J., Ivanova, D., Stadler, K., Wood, R. (2019). The Environmental Impact of Green Consumption and Sufficiency Lifestyles Scenarios in Europe: Connecting Local Sustainability Visions to Global Consequences. Ecological Economics.
- Restrepo, E., Løvik, A.N., Widmer, R., Wäger, P., Müller, D.B. (2019). Historical penetration patterns of automobile electronic control systems and implications for critical raw materials recycling. Resources.
- Kuipers, K., Hellweg, S., Verones, F. (2019). Potential Consequences of Regional Species Loss for Global Species Richness: A Quantitative Approach for Estimating Global Extinction Probabilities. Environmental Science and Technology.
- Schmidt, S., Södersten, C.-J., Wiebe, K., Simas, M., Palm, V. Wood, R. (2019). Understanding GHG emissions from Swedish consumption - Current challenges in reaching the generational goal. Journal of Cleaner Production.
- Lausselet, C., Borgnes, V., Brattebø, H. (2019). LCA modelling for Zero Emission Neighbourhoods in early stage planning. Building and Environment.
- Tanaka, K., Cavalett, O., Collins, W.J., Cherubini, F. (2019) Asserting the climate benefits of the coal-to-gas shift across temporal and spatial scales. Nature Climate Change.
- Majeau-Bettez, G., Dandres, T., Pauliuk, S., Wood, R., Hertwich, E., Samson, R., Strømman., A.H. (2018). Choice of allocations and constructs for attributional or consequential life cycle assessment and input-output analysis. Journal of Industrial Ecology.
- Cavalett. O. (2018). From political to climate crisis. Nature Climate Change.
