= Intrafish =

Fishing industry news agency

IntraFish Media
- Type: Private
- Industry: Media
- Founded: 1996
- Area served: Global
- Key people: Robin Paxton Editor-in-Chief
- Products: News, analysis, events
- Number of employees: 60 (2020)
- Parent: DN Media Group
- Website: www.intrafish.com

IntraFish Media is the world's leading source of news, prices and analysis for the global seafood, commercial fisheries and aquaculture industries.

The company was founded in 1996 in Norway. Today, IntraFish has offices in Seattle, London, Puerto Varas (Chile), Singapore, New York and Bergen, Norway.

IntraFish produces both online and print titles, including IntraFish.com, IntraFish Magazine, IntraFish Aquaculture and IntraFish Fisheries.

The group also produces live events, including the Seafood Investor Forum, and Business Intelligence reports on a range of topics.

IntraFish is a part of Oslo-based DN Media Group, which produces a range of financial titles covering the blue economy and energy sectors, including Tradewinds, Upstream, Recharge and Dagens Næringsliv Dagens Næringsliv, Norway's largest financial news provider.
