= Valebrokk =

Valebrokk is a Norwegian surname. Notable people with the surname include:

- Kåre Valebrokk (1940–2013), Norwegian journalist and television executive
- Per Valebrokk (born 1972), Norwegian newspaper editor
