= Dagens it =

Newspaper in Norway

- Type: Biweekly business newspaper
- Format: Tabloid
- Owner: Norges Handels og Sjøfartstidende
- Publisher: Svein-Thore Gran
- Editor: Ole-Morten Fadnes
- Founded: 1992 as Business
- Language: Norwegian
- Headquarters: Oslo, Norway
- Website: dagensit.no

Dagens it is a biweekly newspaper covering the IT business sector published by Norges Handels og Sjøfartstidende (NHST) in Oslo, Norway. The newspaper was founded as Business in 1992 but was bought by NHST in 2005 and relaunched as a supplement of the business newspaper Dagens Næringsliv.
