= École Centrale de Lyon =

Research university in Lyon

Coordinates: 45°46′59″N 4°46′10″E

Centrale Lyon
- Motto: Une grande école sans frontières (French)
- Motto in English: A grande école without boundaries
- Established: 1857
- Affiliations: Centrale Graduate School TIME; France AEROTECH; ASTech PRES Université de Lyon
- Chancellor: Christian Mari
- President: Pascal Ray
- Postgraduates: 1270
- Doctoral students: 170
- Location: Écully, France
- Website: www.ec-lyon.fr/en

The Centrale Lyon (French pronunciation: [sɑ̃tʁal ljɔ̃]), formerly École Centrale de Lyon ([ekɔl sɑ̃tʁal də ljɔ̃], abbr. ECL), is a research university in greater Lyon, France. Founded in 1857 by François Barthélemy Arlès-Dufour in response to the increasing industrialization of France, it is one of the oldest graduate schools in France. The university is part of the Grandes Écoles, a prestigious group of French institutions dedicated to engineering, scientific research, and business education. The current 45-acre (18 ha) campus opened in 1967 and is located in the city of Ecully.

The École Centrale de Lyon is traditionally known for its research and education in applied science and engineering. It excels in the research fields of acoustics, biosciences and nanotechnology, and is continuously ranked in the top five Grandes Écoles for the quality of its engineering graduate programs. The school is well-reputed for educating and training highly skilled engineers through many specialized graduate programs with a strong emphasis on laboratory instruction. Students graduate with a degree known as the diplôme d'ingénieur, which is an academic title protected by the French government and equivalent to a Master of Science, or with a PhD upon completion of their doctoral studies.

The École Centrale de Lyon has strong ties with top institutions in Europe including Imperial College London and Darmstadt University of Technology. The university is one of the founding members of the Ecoles Centrales Group network (with campuses in Paris, Nantes, Lille, Marseille, and Beijing). It is also a founding member of University of Lyon's center for Research and Higher Education, which has over 120,000 students. Thus, it shares many of its PhD programs with other institutions part of University of Lyon such as INSA Lyon, École Normale Supérieure de Lyon, and Claude Bernard University Lyon 1.

== History and location ==
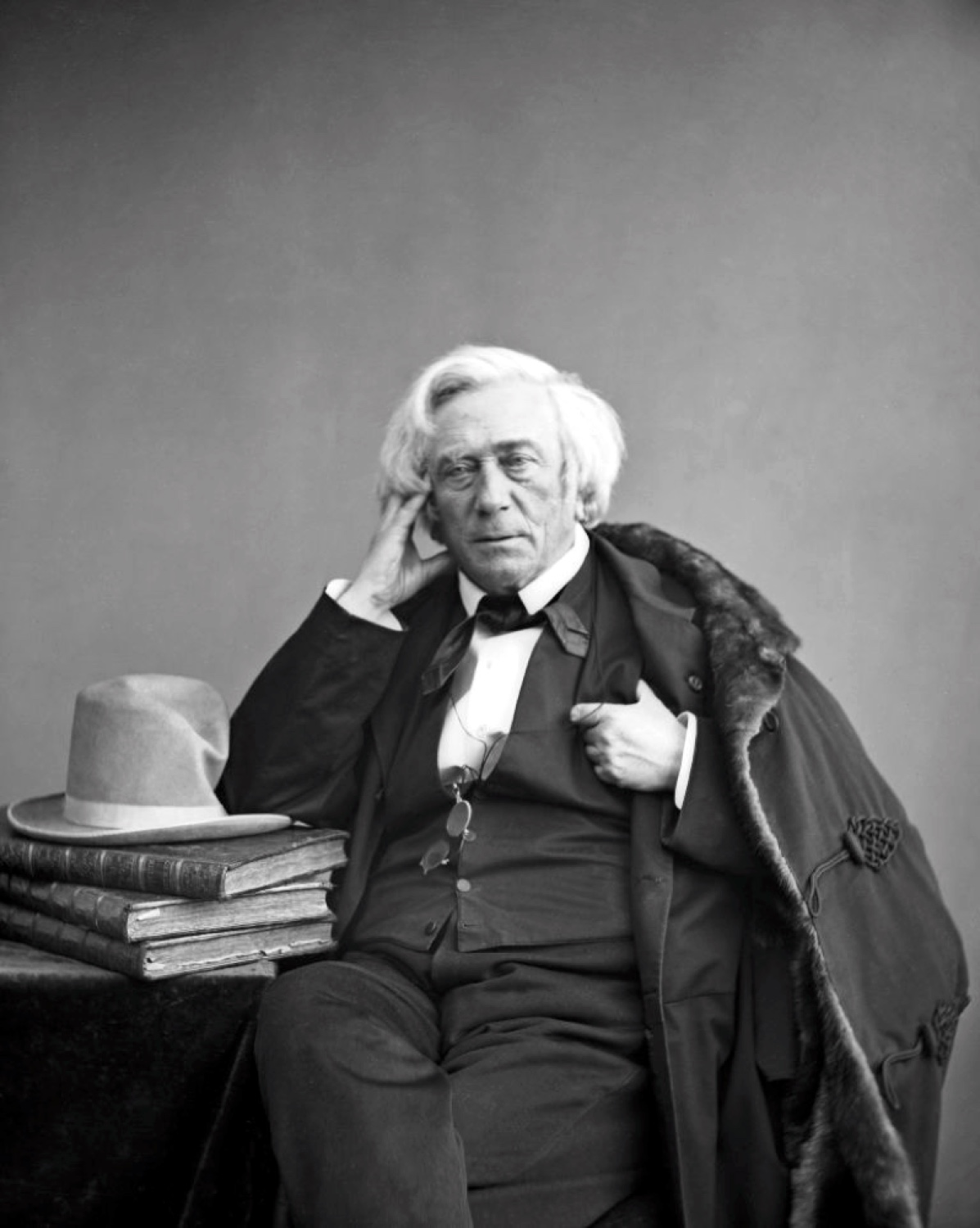
François Barthélemy Arlès-Dufour, co-founder of the École Centrale de Lyon

It was founded in 1857 on a private initiative by Désiré Girardon, who was its first president. The founding vision was to educate multidisciplinary engineers for the emerging industry ("doctors for fabs and plants"). The institution was given to the French State Ministry of Education in 1947. Initially located downtown Lyon, it was transferred to Écully, its current location.

=== Growth ===
- 1857: Birth of the Lyons Central School for Industry and Commerce, on the initiative of Desire Girardon, a professor at La Martiniere School, an institution for the teaching of advanced industrial science and based primarily on the methods of La Martiniere school. The school was located at the corner of the Rue d'Enghien (later Rue Vauban) and the course of Bourbon (later Castellane dock and pier-General Sarrail).
- 3 November 1857: Opening of the school with 14 students, who are promoting an issue, that of 1860.
- 1860: The first class graduated, it will be followed by a promotion of 17 students.
- 1869: Transfer of School Augagneur dock.
- 1887: The school was officially placed under the patronage of the Chamber of Commerce of Lyon.

=== At the heart of Lyon ===
- 1901: Transfer street Chevreul on land donated by the city of Lyon in the person of its mayor, Edouard Herriot.
- 1930: First woman in a promotion.
- 1947: Assignment of the school to the state.
- 1949: Creation of the student association.
- 1963: Establishment of joint competition with the Ecole centrale de Paris.

=== Opening internationally since the campus Écully ===
- 1967: Transfer in Ecully, creation of a campus in the "American".
- 1968: First agreement with the School of Darmstadt (Germany).
- 1970: New name: École Centrale de Lyon (English: Central School of Lyon) and first class of over 100 engineering students.
- 1980: First agreements with Japan and the United States.
- 1983: First batch of over 200 engineering students.
- 1990: Creation of the Intergroup schools "Central", the first agreement with China.
- 1992: School is a Public Establishment Scientific and Cultural Professional, the first agreement with the countries of Central and Eastern.
- 1996: Creation of the European university network for dual degrees (TIME network).
- 2000: First agreements with countries in South America (Argentina, Chile, Brazil etc.).
- 2001: First batch of over 300 students.
- 2002: Opening an office in Shenzhen, China.
- 2003: Opening of the Franco-Russian center for technology transfer.
- 2005: Creation of central Beijing.
- 2007: Intergroup is the group of central schools with Lille, Lyon, Marseille, Nantes and Paris.
- 2006-2007-2008: 150th anniversary of the École Centrale de Lyon.
- 2009: Yin Yang - Alliance project between Central and Lyon Business School EM LYON.
- 2011: Agreement with France AEROTECH

== Academics ==
The centralien program is the main academic program offered by the École Centrale de Lyon, as a Centrale Graduate School. It is quite different from typical university or college studies; and specific to the French system of grandes écoles. The engineering degree of the École Centrale de Lyon (ingénieur centralien or "centralien engineer") is a Master of Science degree.

The defining characteristic of the curriculum is that it is multidisciplinary, with studies focusing on all math and physics derived engineering specialties: mechanics, physics, materials, fluid mechanics, electrical engineering, applied mathematics, civil engineering, aeronautics, computer science, telecommunications and micro-nano-biotechnology.

=== Admission ===
The large majority of the students are admitted after two to three years of classes préparatoires, known as "mathematics superior" and "mathematics special", which are an undergraduate courses with almost exclusive emphasis on math and physics. These undergraduate students must then take a nationwide competitive entrance examination (Concours Centrale-Supélec) to enter a Centrale Graduate School, including the École Centrale de Lyon. École Centrale de Lyon recruits among the top 6% of the students in classes preparatoires, who represent themselves 7% of higher education students, which makes it a selective and prestigious institution. A few seats are available each year to select students from French universities after completion of three or four years of post high-school education. A significant contingent of students also comes from leading international universities which belong to the TIME network.

=== Curriculum ===
Education at the ECL is multidisciplinary and typically lasts three to four years. During the first two years (tronc commun, or "core curriculum"), students take mandatory classes in science (mathematics, physics); in engineering (solid mechanics, heat transfer, digital image processing, computer programming) and in social sciences (economics, management, foreign languages). Students are then offered to sign up for different engineering specialties during their last year at the school. After completing these three years of education, they receive the degree of ingénieur de l'École Centrale de Lyon, more commonly called ingénieur centralien.

== National and international ties ==
The École Centrale de Lyon belongs to the French Centrale Graduate School, together with École centrale Paris, École centrale de Lille, École centrale de Nantes, École centrale de Marseille and École centrale de Pékin (Beijing, China).

Since 1857, the school has built important international ties. Students come from around the world to study for several years on the school campus. école centrale students may also obtain a double diploma at one of several partner schools. Furthermore, the école is one of the founding members of the TIME network. (member list)

=== France ===
  - Centrale Graduate School
    - CentraleSupélec (FR-CS) TIME-in - TIME-out
    - École centrale de Lille (FR-ECLi) TIME-in - TIME-out
    - École Centrale de Lyon (FR-ECLy) TIME-in - TIME-out
    - Centrale Méditerranée (FR-ECM) TIME-in TIME-out
    - École centrale de Nantes (FR-ECN) TIME in&out
  - Ecole Nationale des Ponts et Chaussées (FR-ENPC)
  - École Nationale Supérieure de Techniques Avancées (FR-ENSTA)
  - École Nationale Supérieure de l'Aéronautique et de l'Espace (FR-Supaero)

=== Europe ===
- Austria
  - Technische Universität Wien (AT-TUW) TIME-out - TIME-out - TIME-in
- Belgium
  - Faculté polytechnique de Mons (BE-FPMS) TIME-out - TIME-in
  - University of Louvain (UCLouvain, BE-UCL) TIME out&in
  - Université libre de Bruxelles (BE-ULB) TIME-out -TIME-in
  - University of Liège (BE-ULG) TIME-out&in
  - Vrije Universiteit Brussel (BE-VUB) TIME out - TIME-in
- Czech Republic
  - České vysoké učení technické v Praze (CZ-CVUT)
- Denmark
  - Danmarks Tekniske Universitet (DK-DTU) TIME in&out
- Finland
  - Teknillinen Korkeakoulu (FI-TKK)
- Germany
  - RWTH Aachen University (DE-RWTH)
  - Technische Universität Berlin (DE-TUB) Internationale Beziehungen TIME in&out
  - Technische Universität Darmstadt (DE-TUDa) TIME in&out
  - Dresden University of Technology (DE-TUDr) TIME in&out
  - Technical University of Munich (DE-TUM) TIME in&out
  - University of Erlangen–Nuremberg (DE-UEN)
  - University of Stuttgart (DE-UST)
- Greece
  - Aristotle University of Thessaloniki (GR-AUTH)
  - Ethniko Metsovio Polytechnio Athina (GR-NTUA)
- Hungary
  - Budapest University of Technology and Economics (HU-BUTE)
- Italy
  - Politecnico di Milano (IT-PoliMi) TIME-in&out
  - Politecnico di Torino (IT-PoliTo)
  - Università degli Studi di Padova (IT-UniPd) TIME in&out
  - Università degli Studi di Trento (IT-UniTn) TIME in&out
- Norway
  - Norwegian University of Science and Technology (NO-NTNU) TIME in&out
- Poland
  - Wroclaw University of Technology (PL-WUT)
- Portugal
  - Instituto Superior Técnico (PT-IST)
- Russian Federation
  - Bauman Moscow State Technical University (RU-BMSTU) TIME in&out
  - Moscow State Technical University of Radio Engineering (RU-MIREA) TIME in&out
  - Tomsk Polytechnic University (RU-TPU)
- Spain
  - Universidad Politécnica de Madrid (ES-UPM) TIME in&out
  - Universidad Politécnica de Valencia (ES-UPV) TIME in&out
  - Universidad Pontificia Comillas (ES-UPCo)
  - Universidad de Sevilla (ES-USE)
  - Universitat Politécnica de Catalunya (ES-UPC)
- Sweden
  - Chalmers Tekniska Högskola (SE-CTH)
  - Kungl. Tekniska Högskolan (SE-KTH) TIME in&out
  - Lunds Tekniska Högskola (SE-LTH) TIME in&out
- Switzerland
  - Eidgenössische Technische Hochschule Zürich (CH-ETHZ)
  - École Polytechnique Fédérale de Lausanne (CH-EPFL)
- United Kingdom
  - Queen's University of Belfast (GB-QUB)
  - Imperial College London (GB-ICL)

=== America, Asia and Africa ===
- Brazil
  - Federal University of Rio de Janeiro (BR-UFRJ)
  - State University of Campinas (BR-UNICAMP)
- Japan
  - Keio university
  - Doshisha university
  - Tohoku university

== Research ==
The École Centrale de Lyon is highly involved in research, and has the highest rate of PhD lecturers amidst the French grandes écoles.

ECL hosts six research centers related to the CNRS - French National Center for Scientific Research:

- Ampère: electrical engineering, electromagnetism, control engineering, microbiology
- ICJ: applied mathematics
- INL: Lyon Institute of Nanotechnology
- LMFA: fluid mechanics and acoustics
- LTDS: tribology and systems dynamics
- LIRIS: computer science, signal and image processing

=== Ampère ===
The overall objective of the research at Ampere is the management and rational use of energy in the systems in relation to their environment. Ampère was born in 2007:

- fusion of CEGELY (Center of Electrical Engineering of Lyon) and LAI (Laboratory of Automation Industrielle de Lyon), and
- integration of researchers in environmental microbiology.

Contractualised with CNRS and three establishments in Lyon (ECL, INSA, UCBL), Ampere has over 160 employees. Tags:

- Materials of electrical engineering, power electronics, high-voltage, EMC, electromagnetic modeling.
- Control-command, mechatronics, fluid power, robotics, medical diagnosis and dependability.
- Gene transfer and bacterial adaptation, ecological engineering.

The laboratory is organized into three scientific departments:

- Electric power: to create and optimize the devices for transportation, distribution and conversion of Electrical energy, taking into account their environments.
- Bioengineering: the emergence of fundamental concepts, methods and applications in bioengineering by a synergy between electrical engineering, science of microsystems and biology.
- Methods for Systems Engineering: develop new methods of analysis and synthesis design constraints controlled integrating control, reliability and monitoring of multi-physical relationship with their environment.

=== ICJ ===
Camille Jordan Institute for mathematical sciences.

=== INL ===
The Institute of Nanotechnologies of Lyon was created on 1 January 2007, through the merger of three laboratories: the Laboratory of Electronics, Optoelectronics and Microsystems (Laboratoire d'Electronique Optoélectronique et Microsystèmes - LEOM) of the École Centrale de Lyon, the Laboratory of Material Physics (Laboratoire de Physique de la Matière - LPM) of INSA de Lyon and the Laboratory of Electronics Nanotechnologies and Sensors (Laboratoire d'Electronique Nanotechnologies et Capteurs - LENAC) of Université Lyon 1.

The Lyon Institute of Nanotechnology (INL) is a fundamental and applied research laboratory in the field of micro- and nano-technology. Its mission is to conduct research towards the development of fully-fledged technologies for a broad range of application sectors (semiconductors and micro-electronics, telecoms, energy, health, biology, industrial control, defence, environment).

Research is organised around four main topics (organized in departments): Functional Materials, Electronics, Photonics & Photovoltaics and Biotechnology and Health.

The research programs draw on the resources of the Lyon-based Nanolyon technology platform.

A transversal research operation is specifically dedicated to the development of nanocharacterization tools and techniques.

The laboratory is situated on the campuses of the École Centrale de Lyon, INSA Lyon, University of Lyon 1 and CPE. It comprises 120 permanent staff and approximately 95 non-permanent staff. The annual budget excluding salaries is about 3M€.

=== LMFA ===
The LMFA is a joint research unit attached to the CNRS, École Centrale de Lyon, Université Claude Bernard Lyon 1 and INSA Lyon. It is a member of the Institut Carnot Engineering at Lyon. The activity of the laboratory is organized around four research groups: Centre for Acoustics, Fluid complex and Transfers Turbomachinery, Turbulence and Stability. The research focuses on the physics and modeling of turbulence, hydrodynamic instabilities, two-phase flows, environmental fluid mechanics, aerodynamics internal thermal phenomena coupled aeroacoustics, acoustic propagation, methods of solving Navier–Stokes equations, the active or passive control of flow, microfluidics. This research lead to numerous collaborations with industry players and institutional areas of transport, environment and energy. The goal is to provide developers with the tools of analysis and modeling to optimize their products or processes and reduce the energy and environmental impact. In the transport sector, the LMFA developed an expertise on turbine (axial compressors of aircraft engines, turbo and centrifugal machines) on the reduction of noise (cars, planes, TGV) and the new engine cars. Research in the environment focuses on mass transfer in the atmosphere, environmental hydraulics, noise and noise pollution, industrial hazards. The study covers the energy sector, particularly in terms of process optimization fluids, nuclear or oil phase flow, hydraulic turbines, new energy sources.

=== LTDS ===
The Laboratory of Tribology and Systems Dynamics, was created in 1992 and in January 1995 became a Mixed Unit of Research CNRS-MESR (ECL-ENISE) (UMR 5513) which depends on the Scientific Department Engineering and Information Sciences and Technologies, depending on Section 9 of the Evaluation National Committee. LTDS is on two sites: centrale Lyon (main site) and the National School of Engineers at Saint-Etienne.

Its scientific field is broad and covers tribology (study of friction, wear, lubrication, adherence), systems dynamics (control of vibrations and stability of systems and machine parts) Solids Mechanics (structures calculation) and transformation processes (cut, assembly, etc.).

The LTDS's existence is due to the succession of the following events:

- 1970: Creation of Surfaces Technology Department at Centrale Lyon by J.M. Georges
- 1974: Association to CNRS: Surfaces Technology Laboratory, URA 855.
- 1991: Proposal of widening to Solids Mechanics Department from Centrale Lyon and to Interfaces Physics Department from ENISE.
- 1993: Creation of Laboratory of Tribology and Systems Dynamics, Director J.M. GEORGES. Change of direction: P. Kapsa Director.

=== LIRIS ===
LIRIS (Laboratoire d’InfoRmatique en Image et Systèmes d’information) was created in 2003 through the merging of several former laboratories involved in Communication and Information Technology research. LIRIS is affiliated to CNRS (Centre National de Recherche Scientifique) under the label UMR 5205.

The laboratory involves 280 people with 94 faculty members and researchers from INSA de Lyon, Université Claude Bernard Lyon 1, École Centrale de Lyon, Université Lumière Lyon 2 and CNRS.

The laboratory is organized in two departments:

- Image department: It has approximately 40 faculty members (12 professors, 28 associate professors) and 3 permanent researchers. The department incorporates five research teams. The research activities of the department cover a wide variety of methods for sensors (2D, 2D+t, 3D) data analysis, for a better understanding and for multidimensional data modeling. Hence, the research activities cover the areas of image analysis, modeling, simulation and rendering. Various data representation models are investigated, including regular grids of sensors, graphs, mesh, geometric models, procedural models, statistical or physical models. The hybridization of these models can yield to the enrichment of the representation space. The developed techniques rest on competencies of the research teams around image and signal processing, geometric modeling, algorithmic geometry, discrete geometry, topology, graphs, realistic rendering and augmented reality.
- Data, Knowledge and Services (DCS) department: The DCS department is organized around five research teams involving 44 faculty members (11 professors, 33 associate professors). The research activities of the department cover a wide variety of theories, methods, and applications of information technology to the management of data, knowledge and services. It covers the following areas: knowledge discovery (data mining, complex systems modeling, knowledge engineering), data and services engineering (security and confidentiality, modeling, integration and querying, service composition).

The laboratory leads research on fundamental issues in these areas (image, and data, knowledge and services). It also investigates applications with an impact on society:

Culture and heritage (digital libraries, critical edition, digitization of ancient documents, archiving, 3D virtual museums, etc.) Ambient intelligence (pervasive systems, sensor networks, intelligent video surveillance, secured communicating objects, etc.) Biology and health (data mining, complex systems modeling and analysis, e-health, etc.) Human learning (personalization, cognitive assistance, collaborative learning, etc.) Digital entertainment (video games, animated cinema, multimedia data processing, etc.)

== Notable alumni ==
- Luc Court, French automobile manufacturer
- Paul-Émile Victor, explorer
- Marc Riboud, photographer
- Philippe Kruchten, software engineer, professor of software engineering
- Hervé Renaudeau, former head of the Institut Polytechnique des Sciences Avancées
- Laurent Naouri, French bass-baritone
- Laurent Baumel, French politician
- Joseph Bethenod, electrical engineer and inventor
- Pierre Beuzit, French automotive engineer and former director of research at Renault
- Marc Onetto, Ex-head of Amazon logistics
- Sybil Derrible, French-American civil engineer and professor at University of Illinois Chicago
- Henri Maître, professor at Télécom Paris
- Henry Gazay, French-American Entrepreneur, Circumnavigator, Philanthropist and patron of ECL 2020 class
- Thibaud Elzière, French entrepreneur, founder of Fotolia and eFounders

== Notable teacher ==
- Henri Dulac, French mathematician

== The Graduate School ==
In addition to the centralien engineering programme, the École Centrale de Lyon offers a broad range of master's programs in science and engineering (1 or 2 year-programmes). These programmes are opened to applicants having completed their undergraduate studies at other institutions.

The ECL also has a PhD program for students with a master's level. More than 100 doctoral candidates work in five different laboratories in the school.

== See also ==
- Intergroupe des écoles centrales
