= Thibaud Elzière =

French businessman (born 1979)

- Born: September 13, 1979 (age 47); Aix-en-Provence, France
- Education: École centrale de Lyon
- Occupations: entrepreneur, business executive, angel investor
- Years active: 2004–present
- Known for: Fotolia, Hexa

Thibaud Elzière (born September 13, 1979 in Aix-en-Provence, Bouches-du-Rhône, in France), is a French entrepreneur and founder of several startups. In 2004, he co-founded the stock photography company Fotolia, which was sold to Adobe in 2014 for 800 million euros. In 2011, he co-founded eFounders, a startup studio that became Hexa in 2022, which he still manages today.

He has launched several other companies, including Gama Space, a solar sail project, Iconic House, which rents out prestige real estate, and Kate, a microcar manufacturer. He has been at the helm of Folk, an xRM project created within Hexa, since 2019. Also an angel investor, he has personally invested in around a hundred startups since 2009, including Algolia, Notion and Hugging Face. Since 2020, Thibaud Elzière has been included in Challenges magazine's ranking of France's 500 richest people.

== Biography ==
=== Early career with Fotolia ===
Thibaud Elzière founded Fotolia in 2004, during his studies at the École centrale de Lyon, with his partner Oleg Tscheltzoff. Fotolia is an online marketplace that enables professional photographers to sell their digital photographs directly to customers. It was also at this time that he moved to Brussels, where his future wife lived, having met her during an Erasmus Programme exchange in Berlin. In 2014, Fotolia was sold to Adobe, which renamed it Adobe Stock, for 800 million dollars.

=== eFounders then Hexa ===
Thibaud Elzière founded the eFounders startup studio with Quentin Nickmans in 2011. Originally focused on the software as a service (SaaS) sector, the studio specializes in the creation of startups by recruiting founders, usually a chief executive officer and chief technology officer, to whom it provides an idea, initial funding and strategic advice to launch their project. eFounders concluded the sale of its first company, TextMaster, in 2018.

In 2022, eFounders initiated 3founders, a new studio specialized in Web3, and carried out a global restructuring. The company adopted the name Hexa, while retaining the eFounders name for the original SaaS-focused studio. This restructuring led to the organization of the studios into verticals, each specialized in a specific field, such as Hexa AI, devoted to artificial intelligence, or Hexa Health, dedicated to improving the health system.

Hexa has been behind the creation of some forty startups since 2011, including three unicorns valued at over a billion dollars: Front, Spendesk and Aircall. Aircall has also become a centaur, a term used to describe startups with annual recurring revenues in excess of one hundred million dollars. The startups launched by Hexa have reached a total valuation of five billion dollars, created around 2,800 jobs and raised 700 million euros in funds.

=== Other companies ===
In total, Thibaud Elzière is the creator of around ten startups. While he generally delegates the day-to-day management of all these companies, still being head of Hexa, in 2019 he decided to become CEO of Folk, a xRM or "extended relationship management" application, created within the startup studio. This choice was motivated by the fact that he had great ambitions for this project, without however managing to properly pitch it to potential candidates. It was also an opportunity for him to directly apply the advice he used to give to business executives.

In 2020, he teamed up with Louis de Gouyon Matignon, then a space law student, and invested 500,000 euros to launch Gama Space, a startup aimed at producing solar sails. This propulsion device uses the radiation pressure emitted by stars to move through space like a sailboat, whereas current systems only have electric or thermal propulsion. In 2022, Gama Space raised two million euros, notably from the French National Centre for Space Studies and Bpifrance. The sail, which measures 74 square meters and is fifty times thinner than a human hair, is made from ultra-thin plastic aluminized.

The following year, he launched Iconic House with his brother Robin Michel. The idea was born when the two founders owned a loft too large for the two of them to live in. They decided to turn it into a place where friends and business acquaintances would stay, before turning it into the headquarters of Iconic House. The company's concept is based on the purchase of luxury houses and villas, which are renovated before being made available for seasonal rental, with the services of a palace. The first houses are located in Hossegor, Courchevel and Gordes.

In 2023, Thibaud Elzière teamed up with Matthias Goldenberg and Pierre Escrieut, two former employees of the automotive equipment manufacturer Valeo, to launch Kate, a microcar manufacturer. They believe they are the future of everyday mobility, rather than SUV or other energy-hungry vehicles, whether thermal or electric. They therefore bet on a small, light, clean and financially accessible car. To this end, in 2022 they acquired Nosmoke, a company founded in 2012 that was then generating four million euros in sales. They announced an initial fundraising of seven million euros in 2023. The launch of the K1, their first vehicle which should cost less than 15,000 euros to buy, was abandoned in 2025.

=== Angel investor ===
Thibaud Elzière has invested in around a hundred startups, as an angel investor. For example, he took part in the initial fund-raising of Hugging Face, an open source artificial intelligence company, Algolia, a search engine which became a unicorn in 2021 and Notion, a note-taking app claiming thirty million users. In 2020, he joined the Challenges magazine's ranking of France's 500 biggest fortunes. In 2023, his fortune, derived solely from his entrepreneurial projects, is estimated at 700 million euros.
