= Spinergie =

Maritime technology company

Spinergie is a maritime technology company specializing in offshore market intelligence, emission reduction, vessel performance, and optimizing marine operations. The company’s digital platform offers accurate real-time operations tracking and benchmarking.

The company was founded in 2016 in Paris, France. Spinergie is headquartered in Paris, and has offices in Austin and London.

Offshore Wind is one of the major focuses for Spinergie's data-backed intelligence. Its insights are routinely cited in reportings on the market.

== Recognitions ==
In 2022, Spinergie introduced an alternative method to calculate the Carbon Intensity Indicator (CII) for offshore vessels not involved in shipping. This method was won the Thetius:Zero challenge and was also adopted by SEACOR Holdings for their fleet of Offshore Support Vessels.

== Funding ==
In 2022, the company raised €11 million in a funding round led by Iris Capital and SWEN Capital's Blue Ocean Fund, and alongside Polytechnique Ventures.
