= Recharge =

Recharge or Recharged may refer to:

- Groundwater recharge, a hydrologic process where water moves to groundwater
- Recharge (battery), the process to restore power or charge to a power storage device, such as a battery
- Recharge (magazine), is a business news website and monthly magazine covering the global renewable energy industry
- Surface water recharge, a hydrologic process where water runs off to surface watercourses
- Volvo Recharge, a plug-in concept car developed by Volvo

== Music ==
- Recharged (album), 2013 remix album by Linkin Park
- Recharged, 1988 studio album by The Vibrators

== Other ==
- Ricochet Lost Worlds: Recharged, video game
