= Mailjet =

French email marketing platform

Mailjet is a French email marketing platform founded in 2010. Mailjet is a cloud-based email delivery and tracking system which allows users to send marketing emails and transactional emails.

== History ==
Mailjet was founded in 2010 by Wilfried Durand and Julien Tartarin in Nantes, France through the startup studio eFounders. Mailjet's platform includes tools to design emails, send high volumes, and track emails. The platform utilizes tools to ensure the deliverability of emails, including managing sender reputation and provision of authentication certificates. Mailjet claims to be GDPR compliant and can be integrated with different CMS and e-commerce platforms.

In 2011, the company raised €2.5 million from Alven Capital. In 2014, Mailjet raised an additional €2.2 million from Alven Capital through eFounders and opened offices in New York, London, and Berlin.

By 2015, Mailjet had more than 32,000 customers and had raised another $11 million from Alven Capital, Iris Capital and Seventure Partners.

In October 2019, Mailjet was acquired by the U.S. email marketing platform Mailgun, which is backed by Thoma Bravo.

In December 2021, Mailjet was acquired again, this time by the Swedish company Sinch.
