= Hexa =

Hexa may refer to:

- hexa-, a numeral prefix
- Hexa (company), a French and Belgian startup studio
- Tata Hexa, an SUV manufactured by Tata Motors from 2016 to 2020
