= Helge Brattebø =

Norwegian engineer

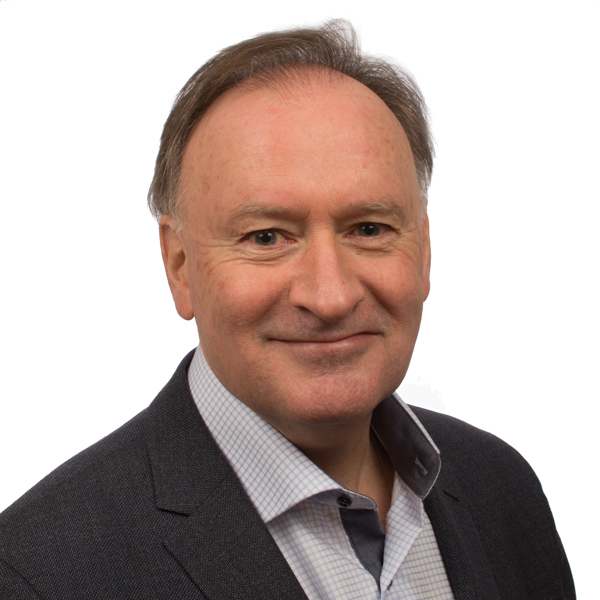
- Born: 1954 (age 71–72)
- Education: Dr.ing (1983); Siv.ing (1977)
- Occupation: Professor in Industrial Ecology at NTNU Industrial Ecology Programme

Helge Brattebø (born 1954) is a Norwegian chartered engineer. He is a professor of industrial ecology at the Norwegian University of Science and Technology.

He is an editor of the Journal of Industrial Ecology, and a councillor for the International Society for Industrial Ecology.
