= ISIE =

ISIE may refer to:

- International Society for Industrial Ecology
- the Tunisian Independent High Authority for Elections (French: Instance supérieure indépendante pour les élections)
