= Sybil Derrible =

French American Engineer, Educator, Author

- Sybil Jean-Marie Derrible
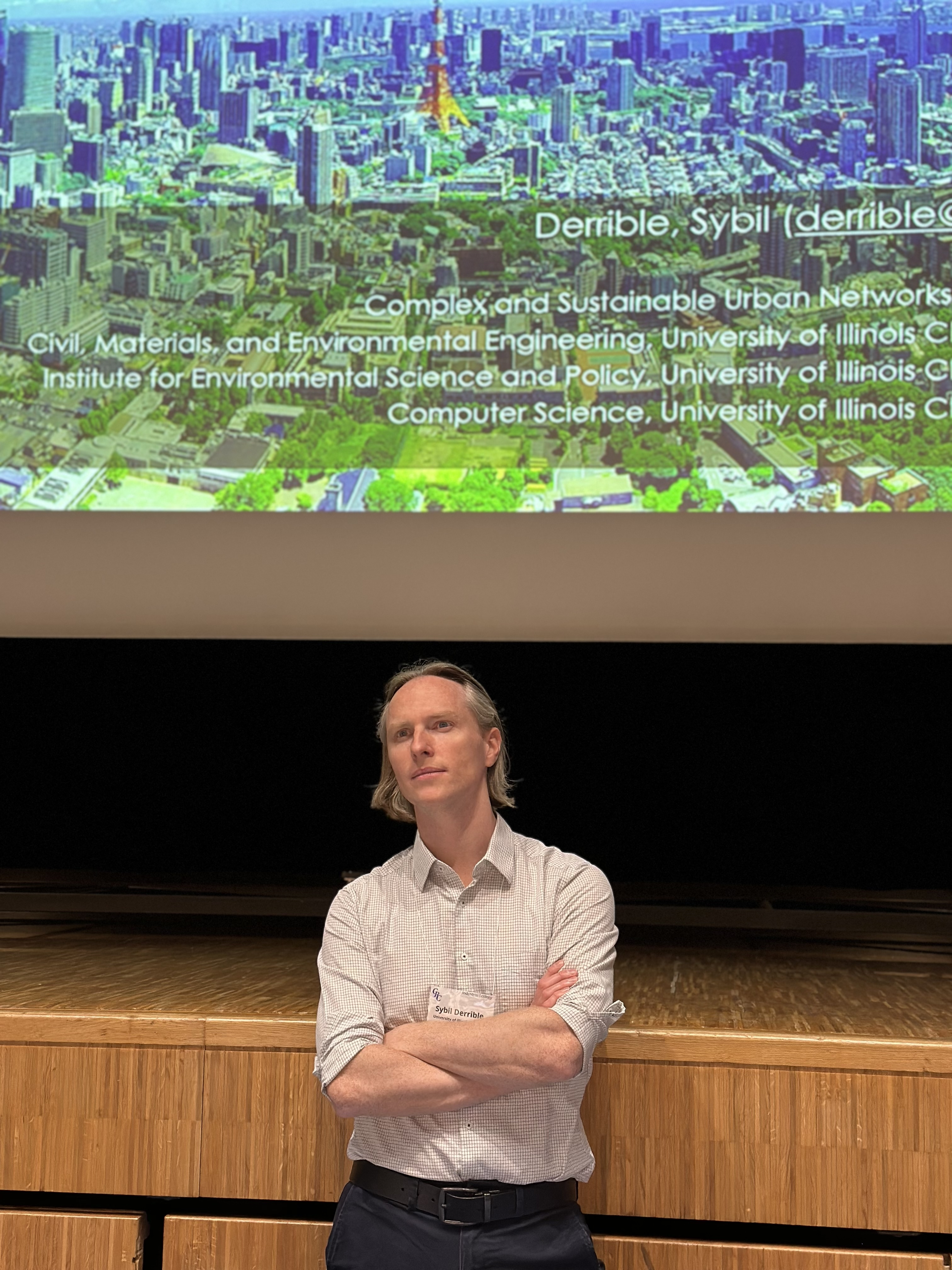
- Sybil Derrible at the International Society for Industrial Ecology (ISIE) Gordon Research Conference in Les Diablerets (Switzerland), May 2024.
- Born: May 19, 1983 (age 43); Saint Pierre and Miquelon, France
- Education: Imperial College London; Ecole Centrale de Lyon; University of Toronto
- Known for: urban engineering, sustainable urban infrastructure, urban metabolism
- Scientific career
- Workplaces: University of Illinois Chicago
- Website: sybilderrible.com

Sybil Derrible (born 1983) is a French American engineer, educator, and author. He specializes in urban engineering, infrastructure sustainability, and system resilience. He is Director of the Complex and Sustainable Urban Networks (CSUN) Laboratory and Professor in the Department of Civil, Materials, and Environmental Engineering at the University of Illinois Chicago.

He authored the textbook Urban Engineering for Sustainability published by MIT Press in 2019 and the popular science book The Infrastructure Book: How Cities Work and Power Our Lives published by Prometheus Books in 2025.

He is Fellow of the American Society of Civil Engineers (ASCE) and Lead Author for the energy chapter of UNEP’s Seventh Global Environmental Outlook.

== Personal life and education ==
Derrible was born and raised in Saint Pierre, part of the France-owned archipelago of Saint Pierre and Miquelon, in Northern America. He credits his background, growing up on a small archipelago, for his system-of-systems, multi-infrastructure research focus.

Derrible received his undergraduate and M.Eng. degree in mechanical engineering from Imperial College London in 2006. While at Imperial College London, he spent a year at the École Centrale of Lyon to study industrial engineering as part of the Erasmus program. He received his Ph.D. in civil engineering from the University of Toronto in 2010. He was Visiting Research Fellow at the Singapore-MIT Alliance for Research and Technology in Singapore before joining the University of Illinois Chicago in 2012.

He lives in Chicago with his family.

== Career ==
Derrible joined the University of Illinois Chicago in 2012 as Assistant Professor. He received tenure and became Associate Professor in 2017. He was promoted to Professor in 2023. His main appointment is in the Department of Civil, Materials, and Environmental Engineering. He also holds a joint appointment at the Institute of Environmental Science and Policy and a courtesy appointment in the Department of Computer Science.

In 2019, Derrible spent six months in Vietnam during a sabbatical and was Visiting Professor at the University of Transport Technology in Hanoi.

Derrible has authored/co-authored over one hundred scientific articles. He studies infrastructure systems as complex, interdependent, and interrelated, promoting principles of livability, sustainability, and resilience. His work has focused on transport, water, wastewater, electricity, natural gas, solid waste, and telecommunication infrastructure. His main technical approach includes urban metabolism, artificial intelligence, and complexity science.

Derrible was elected Fellow of the American Society of Civil Engineers (ASCE) in 2025. He serves as an editor for ASCE’s Journal of Infrastructure Systems, Nature’s Scientific Reports, and Elsevier’s Cleaner Production Letters. Since 2023, he has been Chair of the Standing Committee AMR10 Critical Transportation Infrastructure Protection of the Transportation Research Board. He was Chair of the Sustainable Urban Systems (SUS) section of the International Society for Industrial Ecology from 2017 to 2020.

In addition to his research work, Derrible authored several non-fiction and fiction works to communicate how civil infrastructure works and its role in society.

== Books ==
- Derrible, S., 2025, The Infrastructure Book: How Cities Work and Power our Lives, Prometheus Books, The Globe Pequot Publishing Group. Essex, CT, 260 pages
- Derrible, S., & Chester, M., (Eds) 2020, Urban Infrastructure: Reflections for 2100, Independently published, 211 pages
- Derrible, S., 2019, Urban Engineering for Sustainability, MIT Press, Cambridge, MA, 656 pages

== Selected Awards and Honors ==
- Recognized in top 2% researcher in field for career and single-year impact since 2019
- Elected Fellow of the American Society of Civil Engineers (ASCE) in 2025
- Invited participant (nominated and selected) to the National Academy of Engineering (NAE)’s Grainger Foundation Frontiers of Engineering Symposium in 2023
- Received the Walter L. Huber Civil Engineering Research Prize from the American Society of Civil Engineers (ASCE) in 2023
- Received a National Science Foundation CAREER Award in 2016
- Received a Natural Sciences and Engineering Research Council of Canada Post-Doctoral Fellowship in 2011

== External websites ==
- Sybil Derrible’s website
- Sybil Derrible’s research group website
