= Francesca Verones =

Swiss-Italian environmental engineer

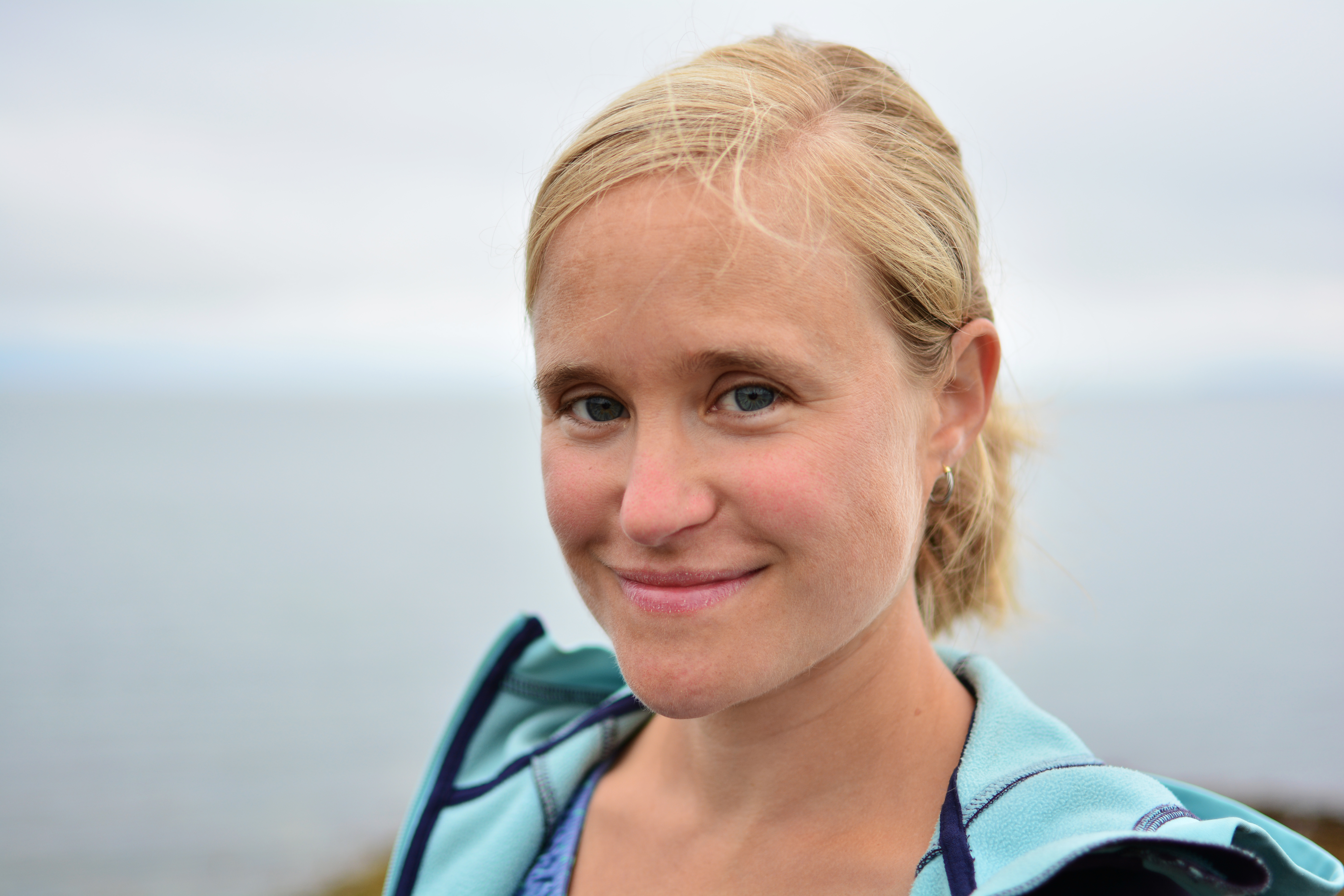
- Born: 30 May 1984 (age 42)
- Education: Eidgenössische Technische Hochschule Zürich
- Awards: Otto Jaag Gewässerschutzpreis, Laudise Medal
- Scientific career
- Workplaces: Norwegian University of Science and Technology, Radboud University, Eidgenössische Technische Hochschule Zürich
- Thesis: Methodologies for the evaluation of water use related impacts on biodiversity within Life Cycle Assessment.

Francesca Verones (born 30 May 1984 in Bern, Switzerland) is a Swiss-Italian environmental engineer and Professor at the Industrial ecology programme at the Norwegian University of Science and Technology. Her areas of research are life cycle analysis, life cycle impact assessment and biodiversity analysis, and she is especially interested in aquatic and marine areas.

== Rewards ==
In 2013 Verones was granted the Otto Jaag Gewässerschutzpreis (Otto Jaag's water protection prize) for an outstanding thesis on water protection/hydrologi from ETH Zurich for the PhD thesis Methodologies for the evaluation of water use related impacts on biodiversity within Life Cycle Assessment.

In 2019 she received the Laudise medal from the International Society for Industrial Ecology, for outstanding efforts in industrial ecology by a researcher under 36 years. In the nomination, Verones was described as "a brilliant young scholar who is pioneering the assessment of biodiversity effects in Life Cycle Assessment."

Francesca Verones received an ERC Starting Grant in 2019 for the project: ATLANTIS – Whales, waste and sea walnuts: incorporating human impacts on the marine ecosystem within the life cycle impact assessment.
