= Anders Hammer Strømman =

Norwegian industrial ecologist

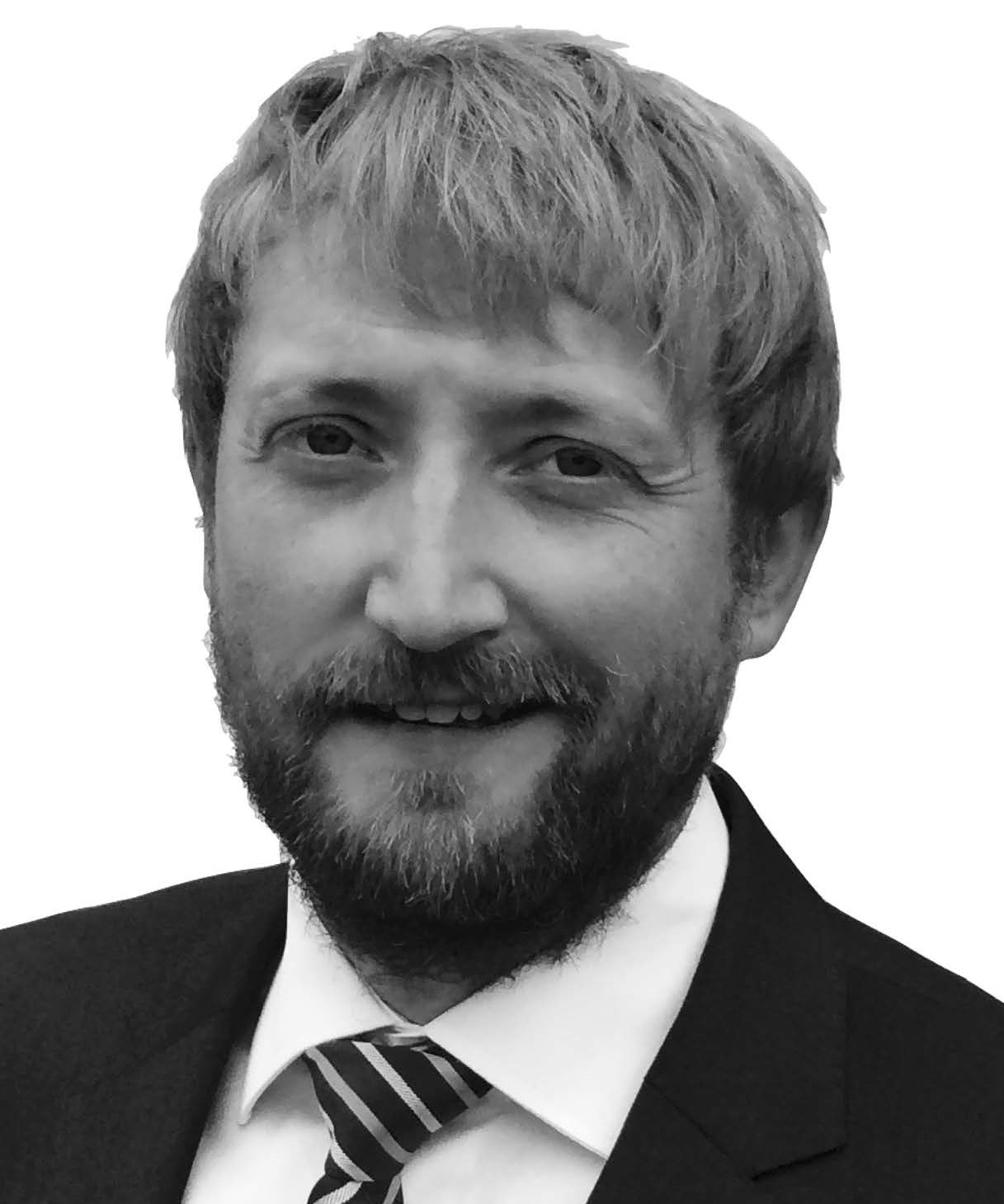
- in 2018
- Born: 10 April 1975 (age 51)
- Education: Norwegian University of Science and Technology
- Scientific career
- Fields: Industrial ecology
- Workplaces: Norwegian University of Science and Technology (NTNU)
- Thesis: Selected developments and applications of Leontief models in industrial ecology (2005)

Anders Hammer Strømman (born 1975) is a professor of industrial ecology in the Industrial Ecology Programme at the Norwegian University of Science and Technology (NTNU). He has collaborated with Francesco Cherubini in developing a method to analyse the climate impact of CO_{2} emissions from biomass combustion, and his fields of expertise include life cycle studies of producing electric car batteries.

Strømman co-authored the fifth assessment report of the UN Intergovernmental Panel on Climate Change (IPCC). He is also a co-author in Working Group III of the sixth assessment report: Climate Change 2022: «Mitigation of Climate Change».

In 2011, he received the Laudise Medal from The International Society for Industrial Ecology (ISIE) in recognition of his research. «The Laudise Medal is awarded for outstanding achievements in industrial ecology by a researcher under the age of 36.»

He is elected member of the Norwegian Academy of Technological Sciences (NTVA).

== Publications ==
- Anders Hammer Strømman publications indexed by Google Scholar
- List of publications by Anders Hammer Strømman in BIBSYS (Norway)
- List of publications by Anders Hammer Strømman in CRIStin (The Norwegian Scientific Index)
