= RTÉ.ie =

Irish broadcaster RTÉ's website

- Screenshot of RTÉ.ie on 27 October 2021
- Website type: Portal
- Available in: English; Irish
- Owner: Raidió Teilifís Éireann
- Creator: RTÉ Publishing
- Website: www.rte.ie
- IPv6 support: Yes
- Commercial: Yes
- Registration: None
- Launched: 26 May 1996; 30 years ago
- Current status: Active

RTÉ.ie is the brand name and home of Irish broadcaster Raidió Teilifís Éireann (RTÉ)'s online activities. The site began publishing on 26 May 1996. According to RTÉ, it operates on an entirely commercial basis, receiving none of the licence fee which funds much of RTÉ's activity. The site, it says, is funded by advertising and section sponsorship. However, RTÉ has had to defend itself from allegations of anti-competitiveness brought about by licence fee support.

As of 2010, it was among the top 4,000 most visited websites globally, by Alexa rankings, and among the top 10 sites in Ireland with impressions of over 75 million per month and over 4 million unique users. A redesign of the website's home page, news and business sections took place on 13 October 2010.

== Online activities ==
The RTÉ News and Current Affairs independent business unit is branded as RTÉ News. The news site was launched in 1998. This section of the site offers access to all the news programmes broadcast by RTÉ on radio and on television. The site employs sectioning of news items, poll features, numerous microsites such as for general elections, referendums, and throughout the national budget. It also provides business news which commenced in 2001 as OnBusiness, which is now RTÉ Business.

RTÉ.ie Sport was founded in August 1999 and provides live updating of scores across various disciplines and covers the range of Irish sports along with major world events and other smaller sports and codes with an Irish interest.

On 10 June 2010, RTÉ relaunched their entertainment and RTÉ Guide websites. RTÉ TEN (The Entertainment Network) was the new name for RTÉ's online entertainment section. RTÉ TEN planned to be an entertainment news website for the social-media generation, which would connect with users through social media platforms.

Other online activities on the site include the RTÉ Television and RTÉ Radio sections, while access to themed selections from the RTÉ Libraries and Archives is also available.

RTÉ Brainstorm is a collaboration between RTÉ and Irish universities, which produces written, audio-visual and podcast content to explain ideas to the public. Rather than being commissioned, articles are submitted by members of the academic community for approval.

== Awards ==
RTÉ.ie has won several Golden Spider Awards, including an Information Excellence Award (in 1999) and Best Media Service Website award (2004).

== Former staff ==
RTÉ.ie has seen a number of its journalists go on to further careers within RTÉ, elsewhere in the Irish media and further afield. Former staff and freelance online journalists have included:

- Neil Callanan, Real Estate reporter, Bloomberg News
- Steve Cummins, freelance music writer
- Donnacha DeLong, president, National Union of Journalists
- Blathnaid Healy, Content Manager, WorldIrish.com
- Caroline Hennessy, food travel and culture writer
- Sinéad Kissane, sports reporter, TV3
- Bill Lehane, online news reporter, Upstream oil and gas newspaper
- Siobhan Mannion, fiction writer and producer, RTÉ Radio 1's Arena
- Luke McManus, freelance television director
- Elizabeth O'Neill, researcher, RTÉ Radio 1
- Barry Whyte, editor, Institutionalinvestor.com

== See also ==
- Australia's SBS
- CBC.ca – the online service of the Canadian Broadcasting Corporation (CBC).
