= NHST =

NHST may refer to:

- NHST Media Group
- Null hypothesis significance testing
