= Mention =

Mention may refer to:

- Mention (blogging) a reference to a user's profile in a blog post
- Mention (company) a web monitoring tool
