= Bjørn Atle Holter-Hovind =

Norwegian media and corporate executive (born 1944)

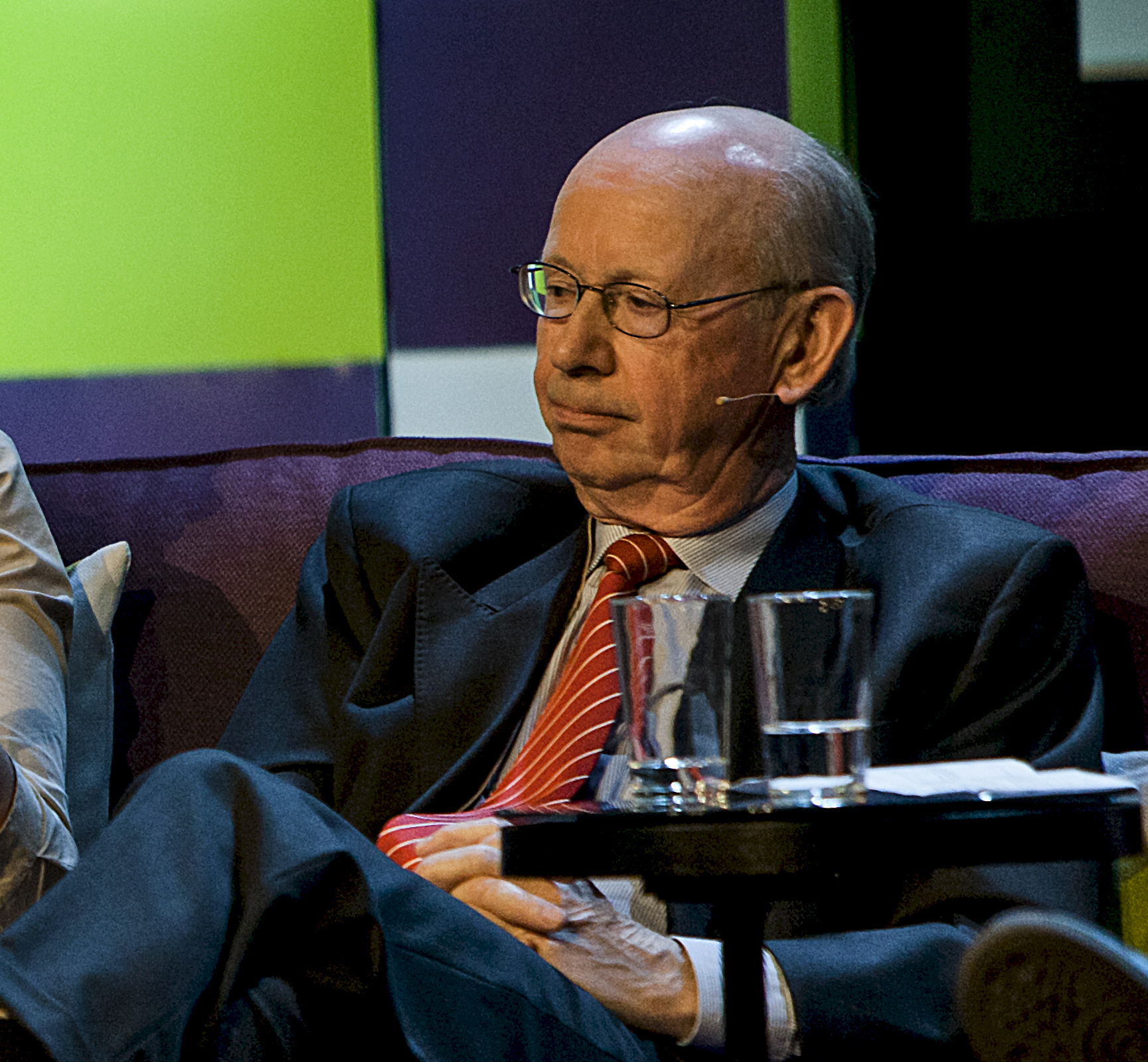
Bjørn Atle Holter-Hovind, 2012

Bjørn Atle Holter-Hovind (born 14 April 1944) is a Norwegian media and corporate executive.

He was born in Oslo and has the siv.øk. degree. In the 1970s he worked in the insurance company Storebrand-Norden, in the Ministry of Industry and the Ministry of Trade. He was the chief executive of Custos Finans from 1979 to 1986 and TV 2 from 1991 to 1993. He has also chaired Aftenposten and Schibsted.

He is married and resides in Setskog.

Media offices
Preceded by position created	Chief executive of TV 2; 1993–1999	Succeeded by Arne A. Jensen
