= Pierre Beuzit =

French engineer

Pierre Beuzit (born 1942) is a French engineer, and was responsible for the design of the Renault Clio in the 1990s.

== Early life ==
He gained a degree in Physics in 1966 at the École centrale de Lyon, followed by a Masters degree (Diplôme d'études approfondies or DEA) in 1967, and a Docteur d'État (PhD) in Nuclear Physics in 1971 from the French Alternative Energies and Atomic Energy Commission (Commissariat à l'énergie atomique et aux énergies alternatives or CEA).

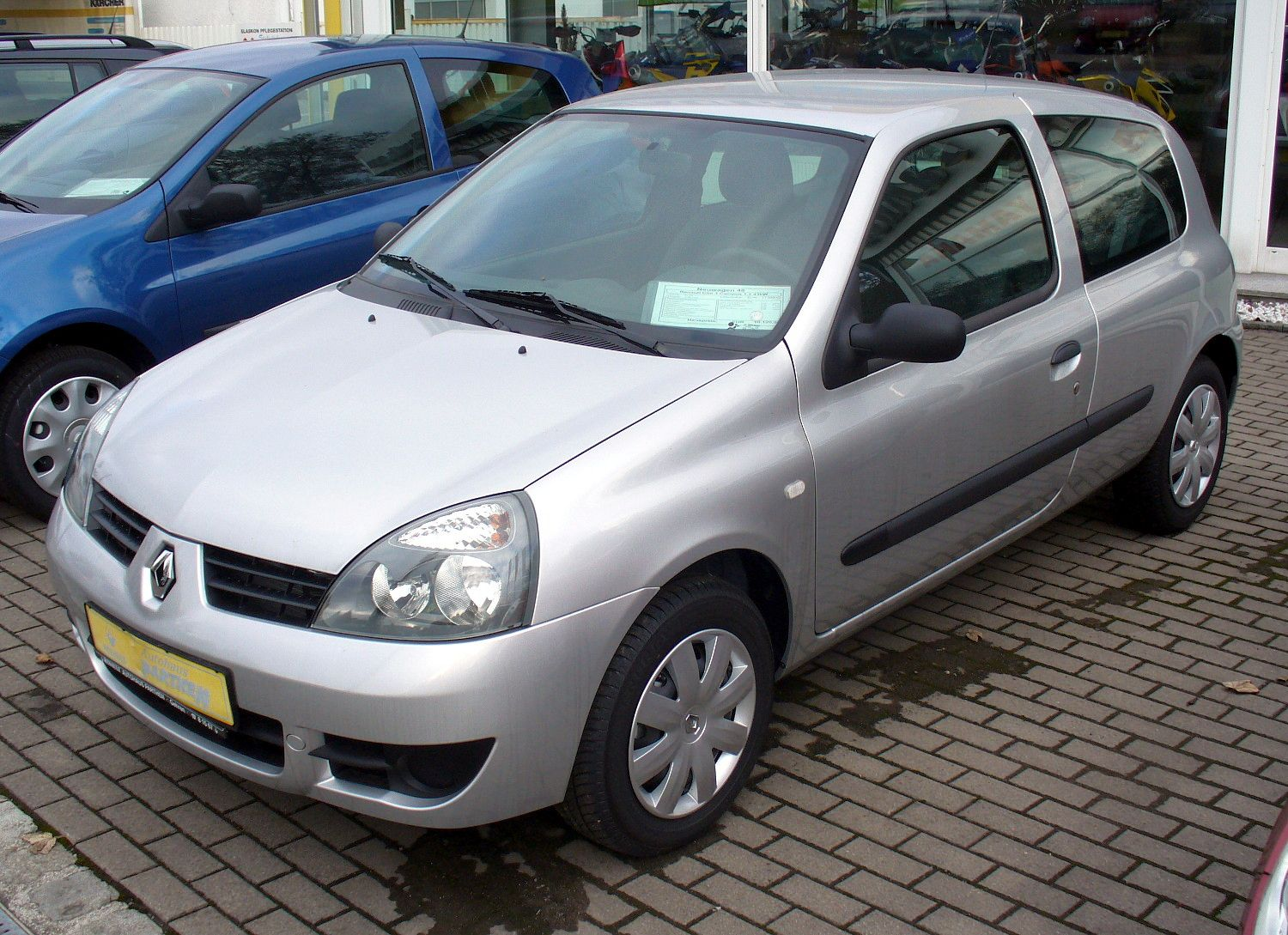
Renault Clio in October 2007

== Renault ==
He joined Renault in 1971 as an engineer. In 1972 he joined the Vehicle Synthesis Department. From 1984-92 he was Director of Advanced Projects (Directeur des Avant-projets).

In the 1990s he was responsible (Directeur gamme Clio) for the overall design of the Clio II (B Product Range), which was launched in 1998. The Clio II design lasted until 2012.

From 1998-2005 he was Director of Research (Directeur de la Recherche) at Renault. Although Renault is headquartered at Boulogne-Billancourt in Hauts-de-Seine in the west of Paris, the design is carried out at the Centre Technique Renault de Rueil (Rueil Technical Centre, or CTR), also in Hauts-de-Seine.

In September 2006 he retired from Renault.

=== Hydrogen cars ===
He is currently researching hydrogen as a fuel for automobiles at the Centre National de Recherche Technologique (CNRT), which researches fuel cells (Systèmes Pile à combustible), and is overseen by the Ministère de la Recherche.

== Personal life ==
He is married with two children.

== Publications ==
- Hydrogène: l'avenir de la voiture?, 24 October 2007, ISBN 2841879739

Business positions
Preceded by Jean-Jacques Payan	Director of Research at Renault; September 1998 - September 2005	Succeeded by
Preceded by	Project Manager of the Renault Clio; 1992 - 1998	Succeeded by
