= Janne Johannessen =

Norwegian journalist and newspaper editor

- Born: 19 July 1978 (age 47); Oslo, Norway
- Education: Journalism and media studies History of ideas
- Alma mater: Goldsmiths, University of London; University of Oslo; Høgskolen i Oslo
- Occupations: Journalist and newspaper editor
- Employer: Dagens Næringsliv

Janne Johannessen (born 19 July 1978) is a Norwegian newspaper editor and media executive. She has been chief editor of the newspaper Dagens Næringsliv since 2022.

== Early and personal life ==
Born in Oslo on 19 July 1978, Johannessen studied journalism and media at the Goldsmiths, University of London from 1998 to 1999. She further studied history of ideas at the University of Oslo, and journalism at Høgskolen i Oslo.

== Career ==
Johannessen started working as a journalist for the newspaper Dagens Næringsliv in 2001. She has eventually assumed various administrative positions, and was appointed chief editor and manager for the newspaper from 2022, succeeding Amund Djuve.

Media offices
Preceded by Amund Djuve	Chief editor of Dagens Næringsliv; 2022–	Succeeded by incumbent
