= Pioneer Square Labs =

- Company type: Private
- Industry: Startup Studio, Venture Capital Fund
- Founded: October 1, 2015; 10 years ago in Seattle, WA
- Founders: Greg Gottesman; Ben Gilbert; Geoff Entress; Mike Galgon
- Key people: Greg Gottesman (Managing Director); Julie Sandler (Managing Director); Geoff Entress (Managing Director); Mike Galgon (Managing Director); Ben Gilbert (Managing Director)
- Number of employees: 19 (2018)
- Website: psl.com

Pioneer Square Labs (PSL) is an American startup studio and venture capital fund, founded in 2015 and is based in Seattle, Washington. PSL develops and tests new business ideas and creates new companies out of the successful ones. As of February 2021, Pioneer Square Labs was recognized as one of the top startup studios based on website traffic to its top 3 portfolio companies.
