= Amund Djuve =

Norwegian journalist and newspaper editor

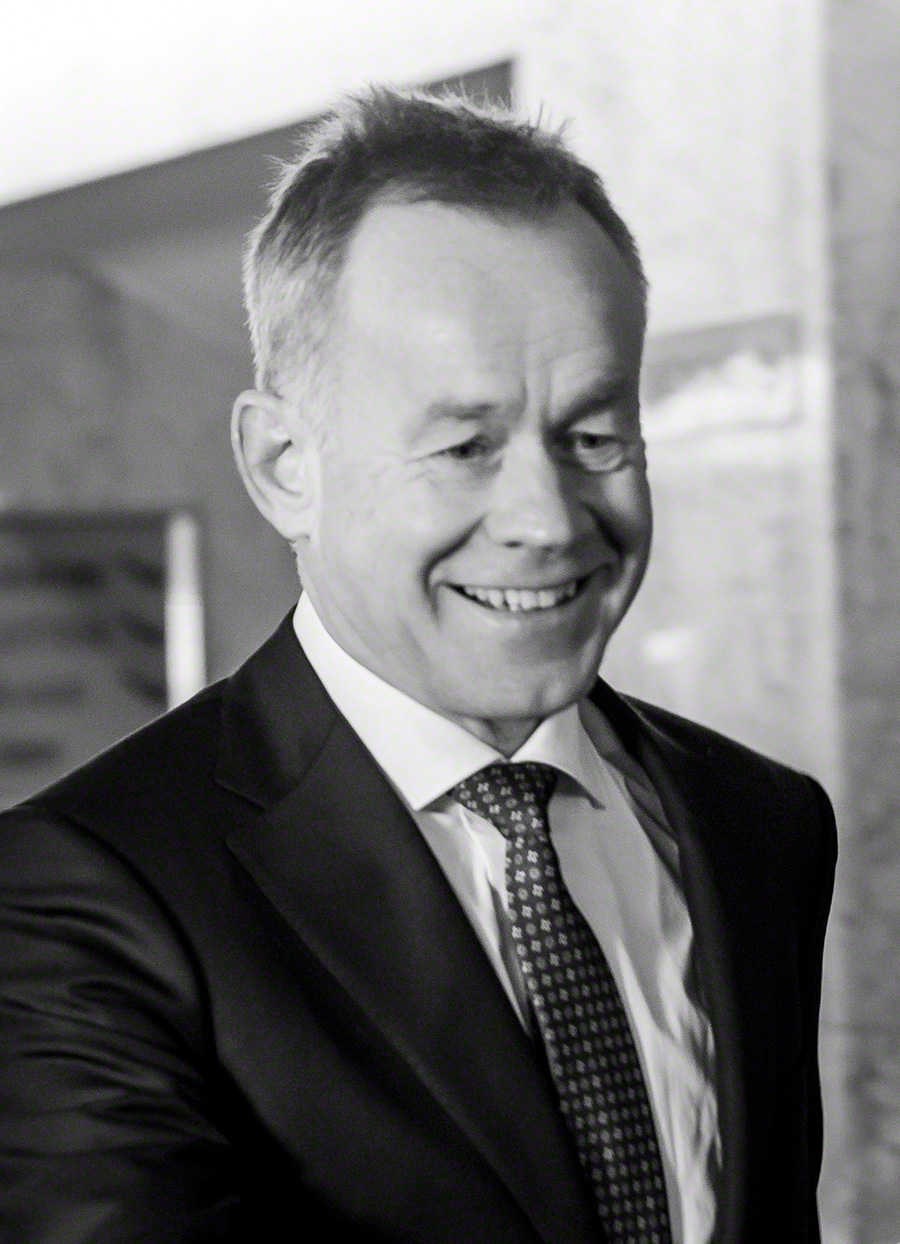
- Djuve in 2014
- Born: 28 April 1963 (age 63); Oslo, Norway
- Education: Norwegian School of Economics
- Occupations: journalist and newspaper editor
- Known for: Chief editor of Dagens Næringsliv

Amund Djuve (born 28 April 1963) is a Norwegian journalist and newspaper editor.

== Biography ==
Djuve was born in Oslo on 28 April 1963, and graduated in business administration (siviløkonom) from the Norwegian School of Economics. In 1999, he was appointed chief editor for the newspaper Dagens Næringsliv. Being a newspaper for finance and business, during Djuve's leadership Dagens Næringsliv has also focused on investigative journalism, revealing corruption, fraud and money laundering.

Djuve was succeeded by Janne Johannessen as chief editor of Dagens Næringsliv in 2022.

Media offices
Preceded by Kåre Valebrokk	Chief editor of Dagens Næringsliv; 1999–2022	Succeeded by Janne Johannessen
