= Henri Maître =

French Emeritus Professor

Henri Maître Emeritus Professor

Emeritus Professor at Télécom ParisTech Institut Mines-Télécom
- In office 2013–present

Deputy Director and Dean of Research at Télécom ParisTech Institut Mines-Télécom
- In office 2012–2013

Director of Joint CNRS-Télécom ParisTech Laboratoire de Traitement et Communication de l'Information
- In office 2002–2012

Personal details
- Education: École centrale de Lyon; University of Lyon; University of Paris
- Known for: Image Processing Pattern recognition
- Website: Official website

Henri Maître is an Emeritus Professor at the Télécom Paris Institut Mines-Télécom, specializing in the area of image processing and pattern recognition applications.

== Biography ==
Prof. Maître's research advanced in the fields ranging from digital camera to computational photography. He has done extensive research in remote sensing applications. His work included studies related to troposphere effects and its multi-temporal correction in differential SAR interferometry, watermarking, feature detection of SAR images and Hough Transform applications.

== Patents ==
- Procédé et dispositif holographique en lumière incohérente permettant l'étude du relief terrestre (1989)
- Appareil automatique pour la numérisation d'une surface tridimensionnelle (1981)
- Appareil de détermination de l'histogramme des tailles de particules ou de globules notamment sanguins (1979)

== Selected bibliography ==
=== Articles ===
- Chen, Qing; Maître, Henri; Deng, Qiu-ping (1 January 2012). "Reliable information embedding for image/video in the presence of lossy compression". Signal Processing: Image Communication. 27 (1): 66–74. doi:10.1016/j.image.2010.12.005. ISSN 0923-5965.
- Lienou, Marie; Maitre, Henri; Datcu, Mihai (January 2010). "Semantic Annotation of Satellite Images Using Latent Dirichlet Allocation". IEEE Geoscience and Remote Sensing Letters. 7 (1): 28–32. Bibcode:2010IGRSL...7...28L. doi:10.1109/LGRS.2009.2023536. ISSN 1558-0571. S2CID 9265597.
- Maitre, H.; Luo, W. (February 1992). "Using models to improve stereo reconstruction". IEEE Transactions on Pattern Analysis and Machine Intelligence. 14 (2): 269–277. doi:10.1109/34.121794. ISSN 1939-3539.
- Cheevasuvit, Fusak; Maitre, Henri; Vidal-Madjar, Daniel (1 June 1986). "A robust method for picture segmentation based on a split-and-merge procedure". Computer Vision, Graphics, and Image Processing. 34 (3): 268–281. doi:10.1016/S0734-189X(86)80042-1. ISSN 0734-189X.
- Maitre, H; Levy, A J (July 1983). "The use of normal equations for superresolution problems". Journal of Optics. 14 (4): 205–207. Bibcode:1983JOpt...14..205M. doi:10.1088/0150-536x/14/4/005. ISSN 0150-536X.

=== Books ===
- Maître, Henri (2017). From Photon to Pixel: The Digital Camera Handbook, 2nd Edition | Wiley (2nd ed.). Wiley-ISTE. p. 464. ISBN 978-1-119-40243-5.
- Maître, Henri (2016). Du photon au pixel (in French) (2e édition ed.). ISTE Group. p. 432. ISBN 978-1-78406-207-1.
