= Quantifind =

Technology company

Quantifind, Inc.
- Company type: Private
- Industry: Anti-money laundering software
- Founded: 2009; 17 years ago
- Founders: Ari Tuchman and John Stockton
- Headquarters: Palo Alto, California, United States
- Key people: Ari Tuchman (CEO)
- Website: quantifind.com

Quantifind is an American technology company that provides software as a service to discover, investigate, and report entity risk as an indicator of potential financial risk, financial crime, and money laundering. The software is used by financial institutions and government agencies.

The company's algorithms extract signals from multiple sources of public, unstructured data, including news and legal filings, sanctions lists and leaks databases. It performs analysis to assess the degree of risk associated with a particular person or organization. It also provides web based investigation and reporting tools.

Quantifind's headquarters are located in Palo Alto, California, with additional offices in New York City, Boston and Washington, D.C.

== History ==
Quantifind was founded in 2009 by Ari Tuchman and John Stockton, two quantum physicists from Stanford University and Caltech. With early funding from the National Science Foundation, Quantifind worked on pilots for technology and defense intelligence mapping, before a meeting with Disney led the company to focus its data science on helping marketers gain insights they can use to optimize sales. The company then extended its data-driven strategy business into multiple verticals including retail, financial services, entertainment, consumer packaged goods, telecom, and QSR.

In 2016, Quantifind began working with financial institutions for Anti-money laundering and manage risk. In 2019, the company announced partnerships with Acuris Risk Intelligence and Oracle to "transform anti-money laundering processes" using enrichment from public data sources. In 2020, Quantifind announced partnerships with OpenCorporates, a provider of data on corporations, and Snowflake Inc., a cloud-computing-based data warehousing company.

In 2021, Quantifind announced a contract with the United States Department of Defense to accelerate development of Quantifind's risk assessment capabilities beyond financial crimes. It also announced Varo Money as a customer and Dow Jones & Company as a partner.

== Products ==
Quantifind's products are described on its website as being software-as-a-service offerings based upon its Graphyte™ platform for intelligent financial crimes automation. According to a white paper, the technology focuses on signal extraction across licensed or publicly available structured and unstructured data sets. Their entity-centric technology is able to link data sets using named-entity recognition and linking (NER/NEL) to identify which customers and organizations present a fraud, money laundering, or reputational risk to the bank. Its Graphyte webpage describes APIs that respond to synchronous and batch queries with risk information on the subject entity of the query. It also describes GraphyteSearch, a web-based investigations application that analysts use to perform investigations and create reports based on their work.

Investors in Quantifind include Redpoint Ventures, U.S. Venture Partners, Comcast Ventures, Andreessen Horowitz, Iris Capital, Cathay Innovation, Jerry Yang's AME Cloud Ventures, Joseph Grundfest (Stanford Professor of Law and former SEC Commissioner), S&P Global, Nomura Holdings., In-Q-Tel, and Snowflake.
