= TradeWinds =

Norwegian shipping newspaper

- Type: shipping news service
- Format: Tabloid, website, app and TW+ magazine
- Owner: DN Media Group
- Editor-in-chief: Julian Bray
- Staff writers: 50
- Founded: 1990; 36 years ago
- Language: English
- Headquarters: Oslo, Norway
- Circulation: 8,500 (2015)
- Website: tradewindsnews.com

TradeWinds is the world's biggest shipping news service, publishing both online news and a printed weekly newspaper, that covers shipping as a global industry. TradeWinds has 474,000 monthly unique users and 6,730 print subscribers. TradeWinds is owned by the DN Media Group and is headquartered in Oslo. They also have an office in London at Fenchurch Street.

== Coverage and products ==
TradeWinds has been reporting on the maritime agenda for over 25 years and covers all aspects of shipping, focusing especially on news related to owners and the commercial side of the industry. The coverage includes new buildings, sale and purchase activities, chartering, recycling, but also marine insurance casualties and piracy.

TradeWinds has full-time reporters based in Shanghai, Singapore, New Delhi, Athens, Oslo, Stamford, Connecticut and London.

TradeWinds has an online archive that includes historical news stories about international shipping.

In 2000, TradeWinds added an online edition which is continuously updated from Singapore, London and Stamford. The TradeWinds App was launched in 2012 and is available on both iOS and Android. And in 2013, these platforms were joined by TW+, a quarterly glossy magazine.

== Events ==
In past years, TradeWinds has been the media sponsor for the Nor-Shipping event. TradeWinds also operate a 'TradeWinds Shipowners Forum' event, that includes the regular Poseidonia shipping conference.

== Chief editors ==
- Trond Lillestølen
