= Arne A. Jensen =

Norwegian businessman (1954–2020)

Arne Agnar Jensen
- Born: November 15, 1954; Bergen, Norway
- Died: December 29, 2020
- Occupation: Chief executive
- Successor: Kåre Valebrokk

Business positions
Preceded by Erik G. Braathen	Chief executive of Braathens; 1999–2001	Succeeded by position abolished
Media offices
Preceded by Bjørn Atle Holter-Hovind	Chief executive of TV 2; 1993–1999	Succeeded by Kåre Valebrokk
Incumbent

Arne Agnar Jensen (15 November 1954 – 29 December 2020) was a Norwegian media and corporate executive.

Born in Bergen, he had a siv.øk. degree, and worked in the advertisement industry during the 1980s. From 1989 to 1993, he was the chief executive of BSB Bates Group. He then became chief executive of TV 2, and then chief executive of the airline Braathens from 1999 until it was taken over by Scandinavian Airlines System in 2001. He then became chief executive of Merkantildata, later Ementor, from 2001 to 2004. He died in December 2020.
