= Mention (company) =

Social listening web application

- Type: Private
- Industry: Software as a service (Saas)
- Founded: April 2012; 14 years ago
- Founder: Arnaud Le Blanc; Edouard de la Joncquière
- Headquarters: Paris, France
- Key people: Jean-Michel Janoueix (CEO)
- Services: Social Listening; Instant Monitoring; Social Media Management; Reporting & Analytics; Data Visualization; Account Management
- Number of employees: 50-60
- Website: mention.com

Mention is a social listening web application owned by DN Media Group and headquartered in Paris, France. Mention sells an all-in-one platform offering online monitoring, analytics, and social media management.

The tool monitors several online sources, including blogs, forums, news sites, videos, images, and social networks, including Facebook, Twitter, TikTok, Pinterest, YouTube, Instagram, LinkedIn and review sites. Users can search the web and social networks using keywords, URLs, or Boolean logic.

== History ==
In November 2011, inside the Hexa (formerly EFounders) start-up incubator in Paris, France, Arnaud Le Blanc wrote the first line of code for Mention. He worked alongside Edouard de la Joncquière to continue developing the tool until it was fully functioning. In 2012, Mention collected 1 billion mentions across the web and social networks, and Le Blanc and Joncquière officially co-founded it in 2013.

=== Investment ===
In January 2013, the company was officially established with 50,000 users, and raising $800,000 in flash seed funding from Alven Global Capital and Point Nine Capital.

=== Expansion ===
In October 2014, Matthieu Vaxelaire, a former partner at eFounders, became the CEO of Mention. Under his leadership, Mention was able to expand its services to offer more than a freemium solution. Vaxelaire introduced Mention’s enterprise services with full account management, suitable for Small-Medium Enterprises (SME) teams. Later in 2014, Wired magazine named Mention one of the hottest European startups of the year. In 2016, Mention expanded to the US market and opened an office in New York City to cater to its growing North American customer base. Mention later introduced Publish, offering social media content creation and post scheduling.

=== Mynewsdesk Acquisition ===
In August 2018, Mention was acquired by Mynewsdesk, owned by NHST Media Group, after reaching $5.4M Annual Recurring Revenue (ARR).

== Features and services ==
=== Social listening and instant monitoring ===
Mention allows users to create alerts compiled of keywords to monitor over 1 billion sources across the web, including press articles, review sites, forums, blogs, and social media.

=== Social media management ===
Mention offers social media management with its Publish and Respond features, allowing users to create, schedule, and post directly to social profiles, or respond to and keep track of direct messages.
