= Hexa (company) =

French startup studio

- Type: Privately held company
- Industry: startup studio
- Founded: 2011 in France and Belgium
- Founder: Thibaud Elzière; Quentin Nickmans; Amaury Sepulchre
- Headquarters: Belgium
- Website: hexa.com

Hexa, known as eFounders until 2022, is a startup studio created in 2011 in Brussels and Paris by Thibaud Elzière and Quentin Nickmans. The company's concept, which initially specialized in software as a service (SaaS), is to launch startups by partnering with founders and providing them, at the project launch, with an idea, seed money, and strategic advice.

== History ==
=== eFounders then Hexa ===
Hexa was founded in Brussels and Paris in 2011 under the name eFounders, by the Frenchman Thibaud Elzière and the Belgian entrepreneur Quentin Nickmans. It is a startup studio: the principle is to launch a startup by providing the founders, recruited directly by the studio, with the idea, initial funding, and strategic and operational support. Its activity is therefore similar to that of a business incubator, with the notable difference that the founders are provided with a turnkey project. eFounders raised five million euros on two occasions, in 2015 and 2016. The first time was with Oleg Tscheltzoff, co-founder of Fotolia with Thibaud Elzière in 2004, and the second time with forty angel investors and European family offices.

The startup studio crossed a symbolic threshold in 2018 with a total sum of €100 million euros raised by six of its startups: Spendesk, Aircall, Forest, Front, Slite, and Station. These capital increases were negotiated with well-established venture capital firms, such as Index Ventures, Accel Partners, and Sequoia Capital. It was also in April of that year, in April, that eFounders sold its first startup, TextMaster, to Technicis. Other startups, such as Front, also joined the Y Combinator program. The following year, eFounders replaced Yousign's existing investors. This was the first time the startup studio had invested in a startup it had not launched itself. The valuation of the twenty-five startups eFounders had launched reached 1.5 billion euros in 2020, up from 1 billion the previous year.

=== Opening of new verticals and name change ===
In 2022, eFounders ratified its reorganization into several studios, renamed "verticals", and changed its name to Hexa, in reference to the hexadecimal system, which is comprehensible to both humans and machines. Thibaud Elzière and Quentin Nickmans were joined by Amaury Sepulchre, who became co-founder of Hexa. The eFounders brand was retained for one of its components, the historic vertical dedicated to softwares as a service, while a second vertical, named 3founders and dedicated to Web3, was created.

By then, the startup studio had launched some forty startups and had a portfolio valued at five billion dollars, with around 2,800 jobs created and 700 million euros raised. Hexa's aim is to launch several verticals capable of scaling several startups a year, whereas eFounders alone could only scale one or two per quarter. Hexa raised a further 20 million euros in 2023, to launch thirty new startups a year by the end of the decade. Like the first fundraise in 2011, it was done with entrepreneurs and family offices. On this occasion, Hexa also announced the opening of its Paris office, named la Cristallerie.

Hexa Scale, an initiative to support mature startups financially, strategically, and operationally, was launched in 2023. Its function is similar to that of growth capital or private equity funds, but on a smaller scale. Hexa takes a minority or majority stake, and intervenes directly in the startup's day-to-day operations. The aim is then to trigger a new phase of growth, with support over twelve to eighteen months, during which the startup's founders can sell part of their shares and a new CEO be appointed.

The following year, after Hexa AI, a vertical focused on artificial intelligence, Hexa launched Hexa Health, a vertical dedicated to improving the healthcare system. Julien Méraud, a former Doctolib board member, joined the studio to create it. The organization of this vertical differs from the previous ones: a physician is recruited to become its full-time medical director, while each startup is launched jointly by an experienced doctor and a future CEO.

== Method ==
Hexa is a startup studio, a company that creates startups by relying on founders recruited at the launch of a project, to whom the studio provides funds and advice. Hexa's business model is based on the creation of startups aimed at solving the problems encountered by previous ones. Thus, the studio was created by launching several companies working on problems encountered by Thibaud Elzière himself, while he was running Fotolia. Once an idea emerges, Hexa submits the project to entrepreneurs with whom it partners. Four or five startups are launched each year.

On average, up to 800,000 euros are invested in each project. This investment is primarily used to recruit two founders, a CEO and a CTO, and to set up a team of ten to fifteen employees to build the first version of the product, generally a software-as-a-service application.. After around eighteen months, the startup is officially launched and becomes independent, notably seek outside investors. Hexa then takes a 30% stake in the startup's capital, the majority being retained by the founders.

Hexa records around one exit per year, as was the case with the buyout of Briq by the unicorn Swile or that of Mailjet by its American competitor Mailgun, for sums reaching several tens of millions of euros. The startup studio has a 6% failure rate, with projects such as Bonjour, a platform to boost sales performance, and Station, a web browser for businesses, having ceased operations. This compares with the average survival rate of a startup, estimated at between 10 and 20%.

== Startups launched ==
Hexa has launched forty-one startups since 2011, all specializing in software as a service. Most of these are affiliated with the historic eFounders vertical, as is the case, for example, with Folk, a contact management application, or Tengo, which aims to democratize access to public procurement tenders. The first startups in the other verticals were recently launched, such as Numeral, which facilitates the automation of bank transfers and direct debits for companies and Cohort, focused on Web3 user account management, linked to Web3.

Hexa startups have raised a total of 700 million euros, mostly from venture capital funds such as Index Ventures and Sequoia Capital, as well as from angel investors, individual investors betting on fledgling projects. Since 2018 and the first acquisition of a startup from the studio, Textmaster, by Technicis, six of them have been acquired by competitors, such as Mailjet, taken over in 2019 by the American company Mailgun. Canyon and Okko also became the first two startups to be acquired by another company that had itself grown out of the studio, the former in 2022 by Yousign and the latter in 2024 by Spendesk.

The studio is behind the creation of three unicorns, startups valued at over a billion dollars: Front, which enables centralized management of incoming flows such as emails or private messages, became a unicorn in 2022; Spendesk, which specialized in business payment solutions, achieved unicorn status the same year; and Aircall, a telephony solution company, has been a unicorn since 2021. The latter has also become a centaur, a term used for startups with annual recurring revenues exceeding one hundred million dollars.

| Startup | Industry | Launched | Fundings raised | Notable investors | Ref. |
|---|---|---|---|---|---|
| Aircall | Business phone system | 2015 | $226 million | Balderton Capital, Goldman Sachs | |
| Bonjour | Commercial management platform | 2019 | | | |
| Briq | Employee engagement platform | 2018 | | Swile (acquisition) | |
| Canyon | Document management for legal teams | 2020 | | Yousign (acquisition) | |
| Catalog | B2B multi-channel sales management | 2022 | $3.2 million | LocalGlobe | |
| Cohort | User account management | 2021 | €3.2 million | | |
| Collective | Product for freelancers | 2020 | €7 million | Blossom Capital | |
| Crew | Workflows and management for new hires and job applications | 2020 | €2.3 million | | |
| Cycle | SaaS for product teams | 2019 | €6 million | Boldstart Ventures | |
| Dialog | Artificial Intelligence for e-commerce | 2022 | | | |
| Dotfile | Automated anti-money laundering procedures | 2020 | €2.5 million | Serena Capital | |
| Elba | Employee cybersecurity | 2020 | €2.5 million | XAnge, Kima Ventures | |
| Equify | Equity management platform | 2018 | | | |
| Fleex | Teleworking equipment management | 2019 | | | |
| Folk | Contact management platform | 2019 | €3.3 million | | |
| Forest | Universal back-office for developers | 2016 | €3 million | Kima Ventures, Connect Ventures | |
| Foxintelligence | Market intelligence platform | 2016 | | LielsenlQ (acquisition) | |
| Front | Collaborative platform for corporate email management | 2013 | €79 million | Sequoia Capital | |
| Hivy | Office management platform | 2016 | | Managed by Q (acquisition) | |
| Illustrio | Customizable image bank | 2015 | | | |
| Kairn | Task-management platform | 2020 | | | |
| Kiosk | Marketing on WhatsApp | 2022 | | | |
| Mailjet | Marketing and transactional email platform | 2010 | $10 million | Alven Capital, Seventure Partners, Iris Capital; Mailgun (acquisition) | |
| Marble | Fraud monitoring and compliance | 2021 | | | |
| Mention | Social media monitoring tool | 2012 | | NewsDesk (acquisition) | |
| Multis | B2B crypto-bank | 2018 | €7 million | | |
| Nextstore | Website design for e-commerce | 2018 | | | |
| Numeral | Payment solutions for banks and fintechs | 2020 | €13 million | Balderton Capital | |
| Okko | Purchasing management | 2022 | | Spendesk (acquisition) | |
| Once | Story creation platform for business communication | 2019 | | | |
| Riverflow | Blockchain data processing | 2022 | | | |
| Roundtable | Private investment | 2021 | €3 million | | |
| Slite | Note taking application for companies | 2016 | €4.5 million | Index Ventures | |
| Spendesk | SaaS enterprise expense management | 2016 | $60 million | Index Ventures | |
| Station | Browser for professional use | 2017 | $3.25 million | Accel Partners | |
| Swan | Banking-as-a-Service platform | 2019 | $5.9 million | Creandum | |
| Tengo | Access to public procurement tenders | 2023 | | | |
| TextMaster | Online translation service | 2011 | $4.8 million | Serena Capital, Alven Capital; Technicis (acquisition) | |
| Upflow | Management platform for unpaid invoices | 2018 | €17.7 million | 9yards Capital | |
| Yousign | Electronic signature management | 2013 | $36.6 million | Lead Edge Capital, Hexa | |
| Zenvest | Club deal management platform | 2018 | | | |
