= Alf Hildrum =

Norwegian media executive and politician (born 1948)

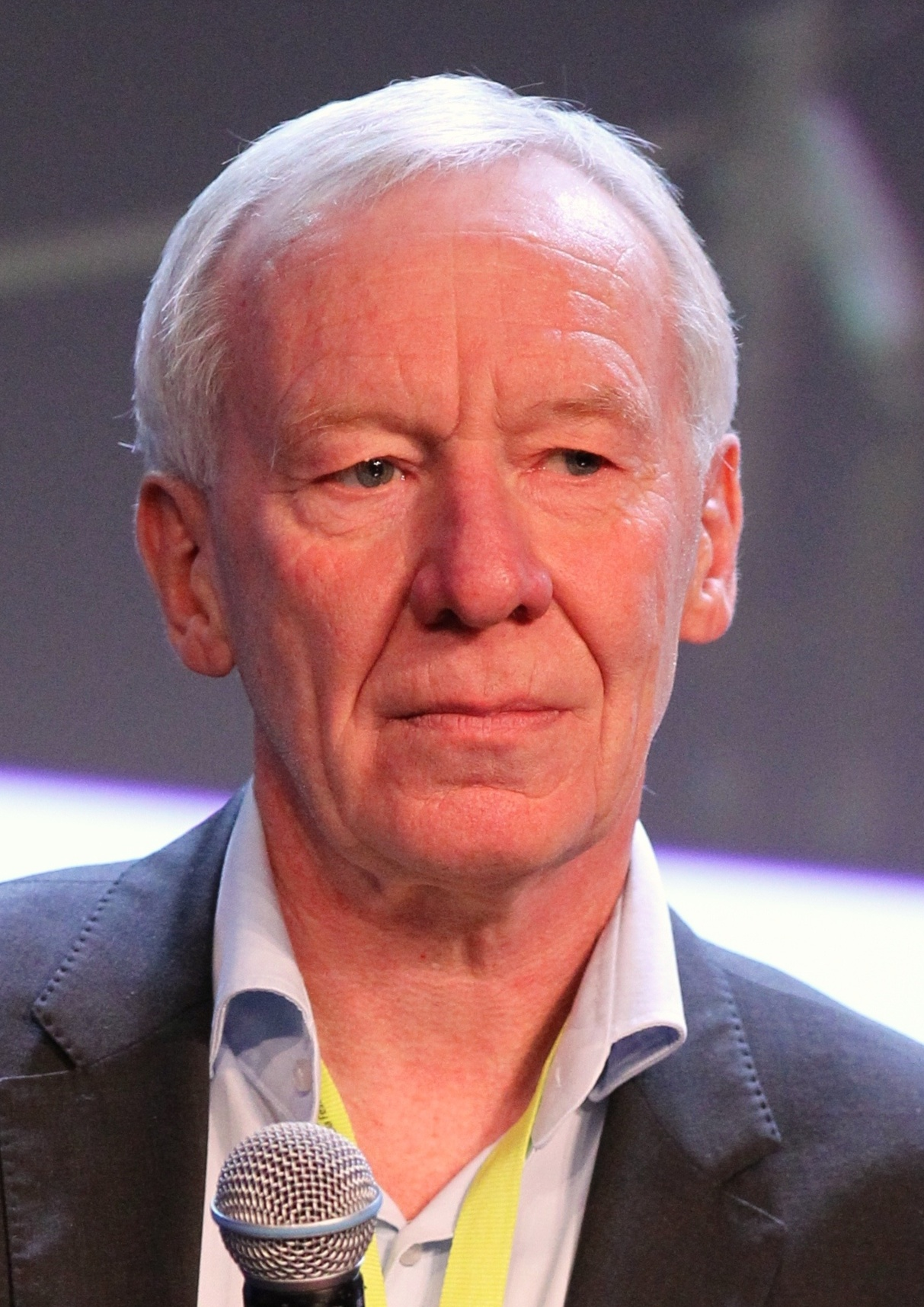

Personal details
- Born: 18 April 1948 (age 77); Overhalla Municipality, Norway
- Political party: Labour Party
- Occupation: Media executive, politician

Alf Ivar Hildrum (born 18 April 1948) is a Norwegian media executive and politician for the Labour Party.

He was born in Overhalla Municipality. A siv.øk. by education, he worked as an information secretary in the Norwegian Ministry of Trade and Shipping from 1977 to 1978. He was then promoted to private secretary (today known as political advisor) in the same ministry, succeeding Tove Strand Gerhardsen. He was a journalist in Arbeidernes Pressekontor from 1979 to 1981, editor-in-chief of Bergens Arbeiderblad from 1981 to 1984, subeditor in Arbeidernes Pressekontor from 1984 to 1988, chief executive officer of A-pressen from 1988 to 2007 and then chief executive officer of TV 2.

Media offices
Preceded by Kåre Valebrokk	CEO of TV 2; 2007–present	Incumbent
