= Upstream (newspaper) =

Oil and gas industry news publication

- Type: Weekly oil and gas industry news publication, focusing on global upstream sector
- Format: Website, Tabloid (until 2024)
- Owner: DN Media Group
- Editor-in-chief: Leia Parker
- Staff writers: 25
- Founded: 1996
- Language: English
- Headquarters: Oslo, Norway
- Circulation: 6585 (June 2007); 7078 (2008 average net circulation 1 January 2008-31 December 2008 according to Audit Bureau of Circulation)
- ISSN: 0807-6472
- OCLC number: 223512583
- Website: www.upstreamonline.com

Upstream is an independent oil and gas industry upstream sector news site. The publication is owned by DN Media Group. It is headquartered in Oslo, Norway. The newspaper covers the upstream sector of the global oil and gas industry with full-time staff correspondents in all the major centres of the industry. It is published every Friday. Upstream had full-time reporters based in its head office in Oslo, as well as bureaux and correspondents in London, Moscow, Accra, New Delhi, Singapore, Wellington, Rio de Janeiro and Houston. Its editor in chief is Leia Parker.

The newspaper was founded in 1996 to compete with well-established rivals including Oil & Gas Journal, Petroleum Intelligence Weekly, and Offshore Engineer. It covers all aspects of the upstream industry, but focuses especially on news related to business, policy and the sector's key players as well as the commercial side of the industry. Coverage includes exploration, field development, contracts, company news, technological developments and the liquefied natural gas sector, as well as political and financial news which affects the exploration and production sector.

In 2001, Upstream added an online edition, upstreamonline.com, which is updated 24 hours a day, five days a week from London, Oslo, Houston and Perth. It provides breaking news and online feature articles written by a dedicated online editorial team. In 2024, the weekly newspaper was discontinued. Regular 'Focus' editions are still published on a quarterly basis.
