= Kåre Valebrokk =

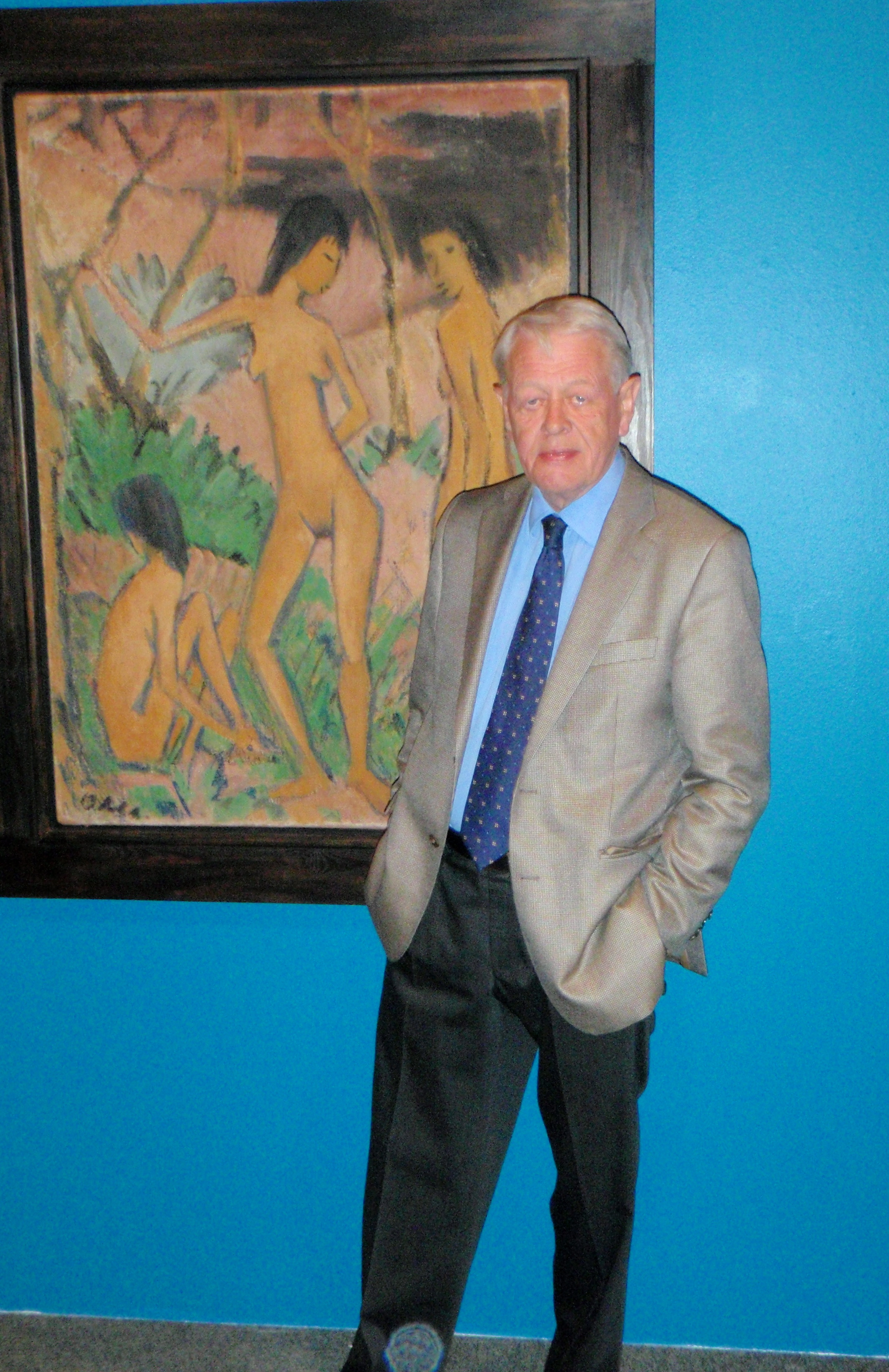
Kåre Valebrokk opening an art exhibition at Bergen Kunstmuseum, May 2009

Kåre Valebrokk (17 December 1940 – 9 February 2013) was a Norwegian journalist and television executive. He was editor-in-chief and administrative director of TV 2 from October 1999 until June 2007, when he retired. He was the father of economist and editor Per Valebrokk.

Valebrokk started his media career as a journalist in Morgenbladet from 1962 to 1968, and was later a journalist in Verdens Gang from 1979 to 1985. In 1985, Valebrokk was appointed editor-in-chief of the newspaper Dagens Næringsliv, a position he held until he joined TV 2 in 1999. From 1989 he was also the CEO of Norges Handels- og Sjøfartstidende AS, the company that published the newspaper. He has advocated libertarian views, like flat tax.

After his retirement from TV 2, Valebrokk wrote a weekly column for Aftenposten, and, among other tasks, was chairman of the Bergen Art Museum.

According to his son, Valebrokk died in his sleep on 9 February 2013. He was 72 years old.

Media offices
| Preceded by Eric Cameron | Chief editor of Dagens Næringsliv; 1985–1999 | Succeeded by Amund Djuve |
| Preceded by Arne A. Jensen | CEO of TV 2; 1999–2007 | Succeeded by Alf Hildrum |
