= Recharge (magazine) =

Business news website

- Editor: Ole Petter Pedersen
- Frequency: 24/7 online; daily and weekly e-newsletters
- Publisher: DN Media Group
- Founded: 2009; 17 years ago
- Country: United Kingdom
- Based in: London
- Language: English
- Website: www.rechargenews.com
- ISSN: 1891-2079

Recharge is a business news website covering the global renewable energy industry, particularly the wind power industry. It is owned by Norway's DN Media Group, but headquartered in London, with editorial staff in the US, UK, Germany and Norway.

== Overview ==
Recharge was first established in January 2009 as a weekly newspaper, before becoming a monthly glossy magazine in January 2013. It has been fully digital since 2023.

Recharge has been described as "one of the most authoritative publications in the renewable energy sector", and as "a role model for the future of trade journalism" by German industrial giant Siemens.

Its breaking stories have been picked up by major international news organizations, including the BBC, The Washington Post and Denmark's Dagbladet Børsen.

It also produces daily newspapers at industry trade events including the European Wind Energy Association's (now WindEurope's) annual conference and exhibition and biannual offshore iteration, as well as for the American Wind Energy Association's annual expo.recharge

== Thought Leaders Summit ==
Recharge's "Thought Leaders Summit" was an annual invitation-only forum for senior international renewable-energy executives that was held for the first time in Holmenkollen (Norway) on 9 January 2014.

The inaugural meeting was attended by 50 senior professionals from the global renewable-energy industry, including high-level executives from Siemens, Vestas, Statoil and E.ON. The keynote speech was delivered by Scotland's energy minister, Fergus Ewing and the event was officially opened by Henrik O. Madsen.

The colloquium, which operates under the Chatham House Rule, was most recently held in Hamburg, Germany, on 25 September 2018 ahead of the Global Wind Summit, supported by WindEurope and Hamburg Messe and sponsored by MHI Vestas, GE and Lloyds Register.

== Awards ==
In 2010, Recharge was awarded the Advocate of the Year award by the UK's Renewable Energy Association, the first time the prize had been given to a publication.
