= Luc Court =

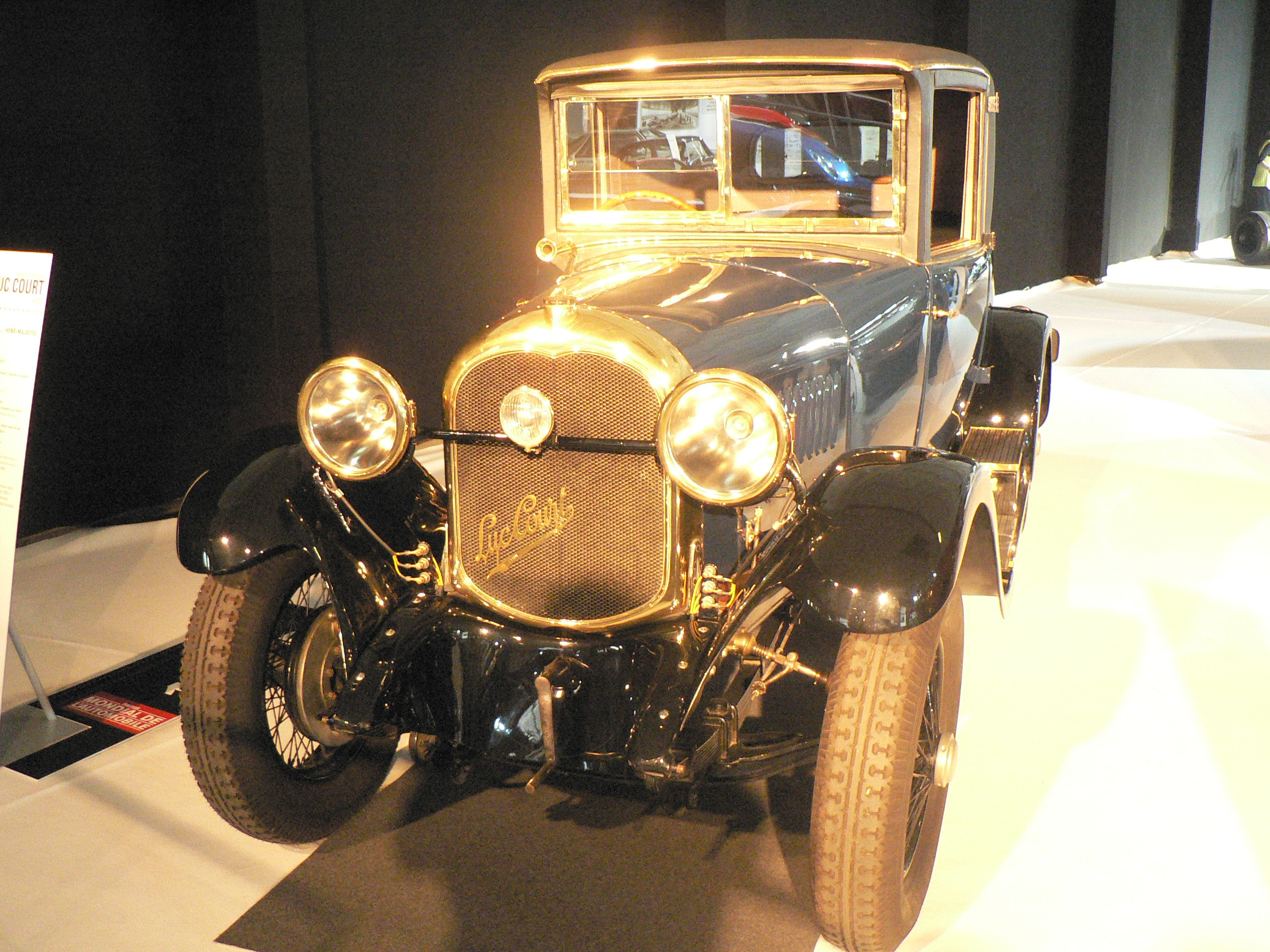
Luc Court H4S2

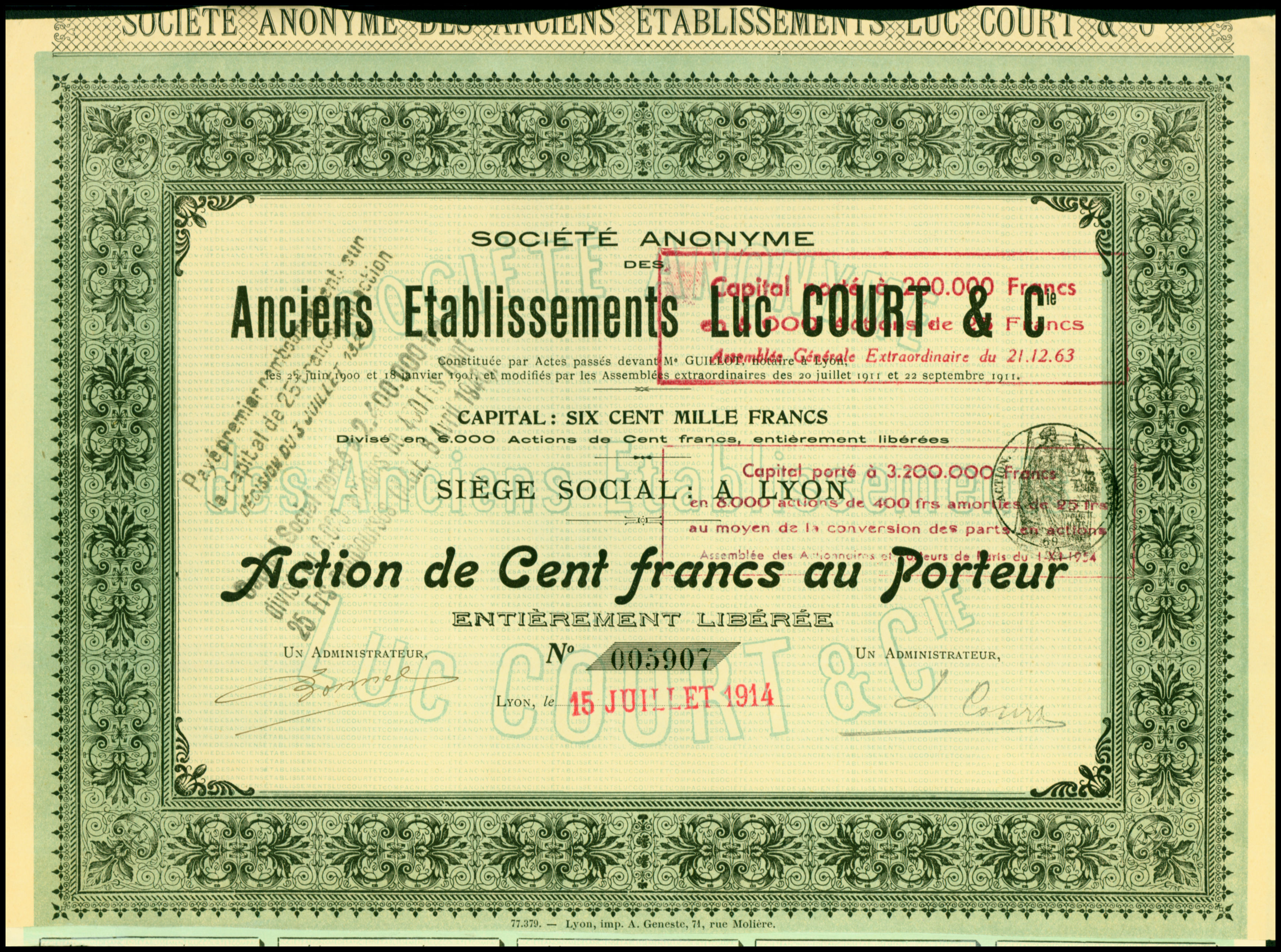
Share of the Anciens Etablissements Luc Court & C, issued 15. July 1914

The Société des Anc. Établissements Luc Court et Cie was a French automobile manufactured in Lyon from 1899 until 1936.

Early models had a distinctive "demountable chassis". Designed by one Lacoin, the front part of the chassis could be removed from the bodywork and rear wheels; this could then be attached to a different body and wheels. The transformation was advertised as "taking place within a few minutes, without tools". 1912 saw the company produce a range of three cars, fours of 2155 cc and 3631 cc and a six of 3233 cc. The company continued production of passenger vehicles until shortly before World War II; after the war, it built mostly light commercial vehicles, as well as a few 12 hp (8.9 kW) and 20 hp (15 kW) cars.

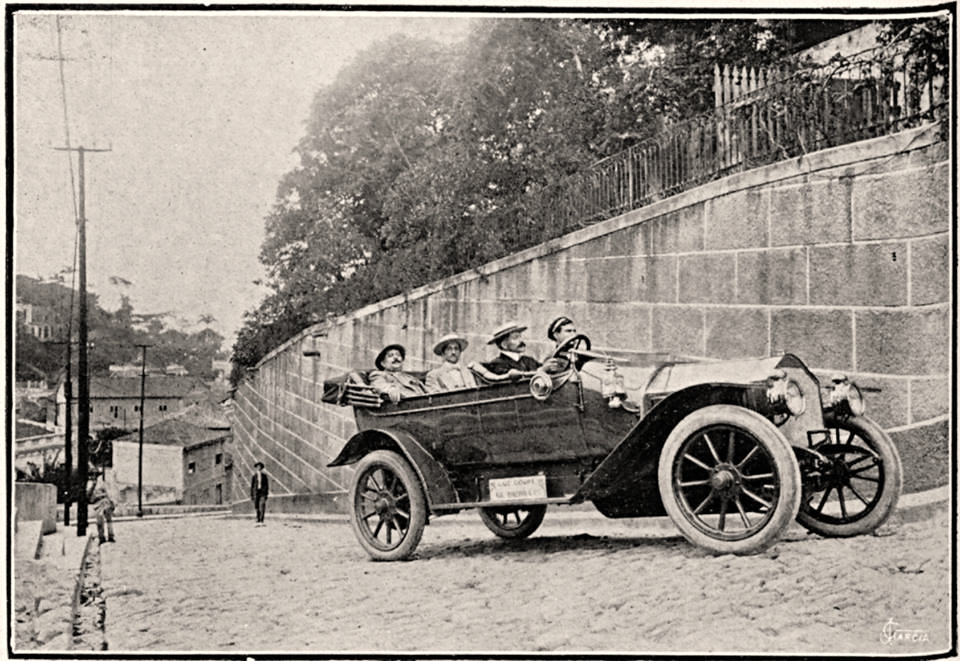
A Luc Court is subjected to a climb test (35% slope) in Santa Teresa neighborhood, Rio de Janeiro, 1912
