= Mynewsdesk =

Swedish brand newsroom and multimedia PR platform

- Type: part of DN Media Group
- Industry: Public relations
- Founded: 2003
- Founder: Kristofer Björkman, Peter Ingman, David Wennergren
- Headquarters: Stockholm, Sweden
- Key people: Gustav Berghog (CEO); Daniel Wagnerius (CTO); Andreas Hjerpe (CMO); Andreas Wallin (CSO); Sandra Lindberg (COO)
- Revenue: SEK 100 million (2013)
- Number of employees: 160 (2013)
- Website: mynewsdesk.com

Mynewsdesk is an all in one platform that combines press release distribution & media monitoring in to one simple tool. Mynewsdesk is known for SEO optimized newsrooms and multimedia public relations platform where companies can set up newsrooms to publish and distribute their content simultaneously publishing it on social media or embed the newsroom to their own site.

Mynewsdesk media monitoring capabilities have grown significantly since 2024, with focus on making media monitoring more accurate, automated and easier to use for communicators. With strong offering in Norway which was reflected in scoring 9.9/10 in procurement process for large public institution in Norway. https://www.kom24.no/anbud-automatisering-medieovervaking/ssb-velger-mynewsdesk/872164

Mynewsdesk was founded in 2003 and is based in Stockholm, Sweden, but the company also has sales offices in Gothenburg, Oslo, Copenhagen, and Leipzig.
