= Iris Capital =

Franco-German venture capital firm

Iris Capital Management
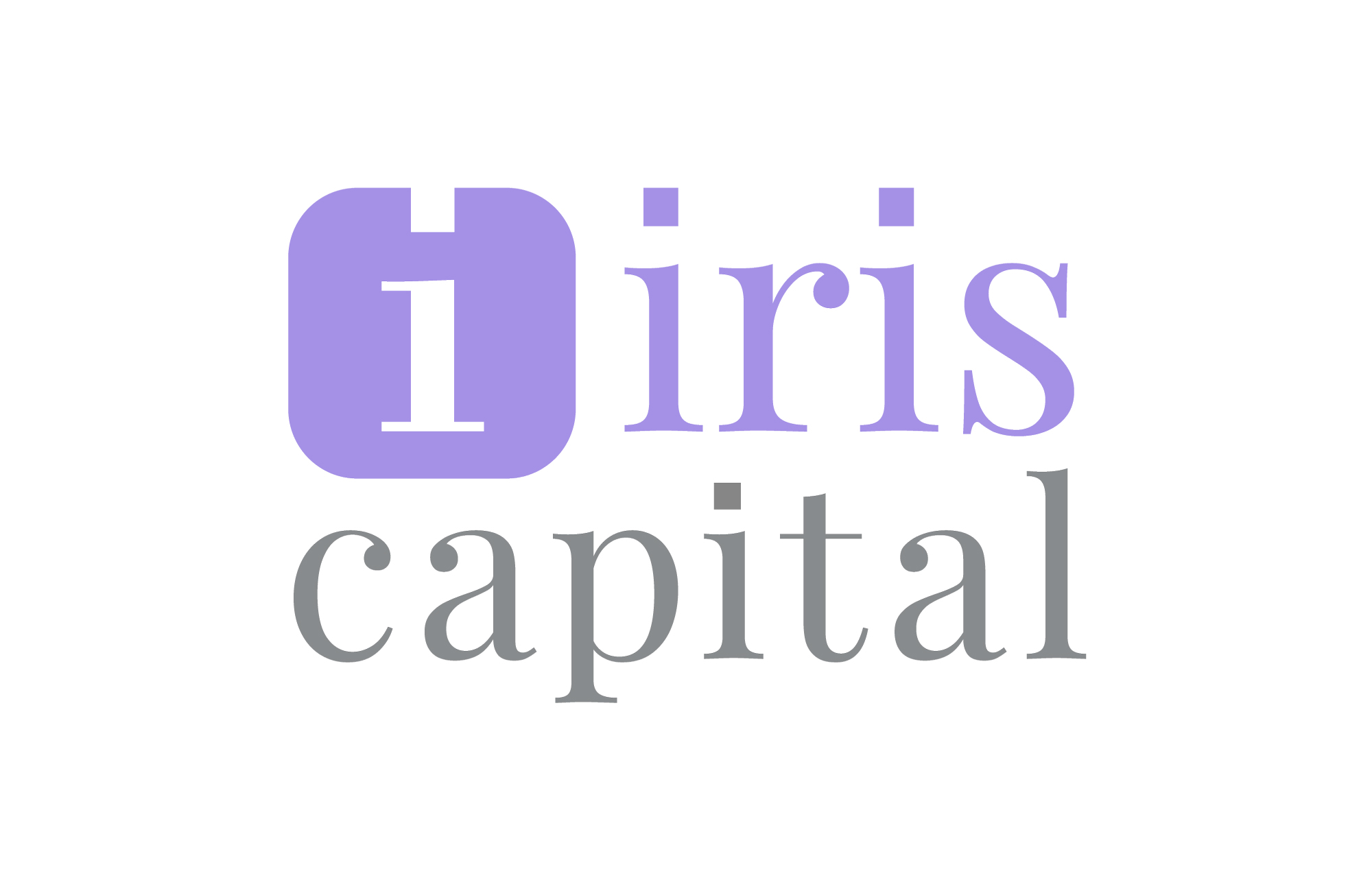
- Industry: Venture capital
- Founded: 1986; 40 years ago
- Headquarters: Paris, France
- Number of locations: 7 (Paris, San Francisco, Berlin, Munich, Tel Aviv, Tokyo, Dubai)
- Total assets: €900 million+
- Website: www.iriscapital.com

Iris Capital is a venture capital firm specializing in the digital economy, primarily active in Europe. Since its creation, the Iris Capital team has invested more than a billion euros in over 230 innovative companies. Iris Capital is sponsored by Orange and Publicis since 2012.

== Overview ==
Created in 1986, within the Caisse des Dépôts, the team was spun off in 2003 and became Iris Capital. Investing internationally since 1991, Iris Capital has always held a sector-specific strategy covering media, telecommunications, information technology and Internet services, which have converged into today's digital economy.

In 2012, Iris Capital entered into a partnership with Orange and Publicis who chose Iris Capital it as manager of their joint multi-corporate venture fund initiative dedicated to the digital economy. In 2017, the multi-corporate venture fund extended its model and welcomed new partners, BRED/Banque Populaire and Valeo, joined in 2019 by Bridgestone.

== Geographical reach ==
Iris Capital has invested in over 20 countries (of which 18 in Europe) and is mainly active in continental Europe, with a core activity in France, Germany, Benelux and Switzerland. Iris Capital acts as lead investor or in some circumstances as value-added co-investor. Moreover, Iris Capital in the Middle East is the fund manager of STC Ventures, the corporate venture fund of Saudi Arabian telecom operator, STC. Iris Capital is based in Paris and has offices in San Francisco, Berlin, Munich, Tel Aviv, Tokyo, and Dubai.

== Portfolio ==
=== Current Portfolio ===
Among Iris Capital's recent portfolio companies are the following:

- Adjust – Germany: Attribution and analytics for apps
- Adomik – France: Yield management of programmatic ad inventory
- Getsafe – Germany: App to manage insurance on smartphones
- iAdvize – France: Conversational commerce platform
- Kyriba – France/US: treasury solutions in the cloud
- Lookout – US: mobile security
- PlaceIQ – US: Location intelligence services
- Quantifind – US
- ReBuy – Germany: Online commerce
- Scality – France/US: Storage management and infrastructure software
- Searchmetrics – Germany: SEO software
- Secret Double Octopus – Israel: Password-free authentication
- Shift Technology – France: Fraud detection software in insurance
- Studitemps – Germany: Temp workers
- Yodo1 – China

=== Past Portfolio Investments ===
Past portfolio companies Iris Capital has backed:

- Instant Luxe – France (acquired by Galeries Lafayette)
- ProWebCE – France (acquired by Edenred)
- Mister Auto – France (acquired by PSA Peugeot Citroën)
- MoPub – France (acquired by Twitter)
- Alphanim – France (acquired by Gaumont)
- Cirpack – France (acquired by Thomson/Technicolor)
- Careem – Dubai (acquired by Uber)
- Cobi – Germany (acquired by Bosch)
- Computec – Germany (acquired by Marquard Media)
- Erenis – France (acquired by Neuf Cegetel/SFR)
- FastBooking – France (acquired by 3i and EDRIP)
- Gengo – France (acquired by Lionbridge)
- Human Inference – Pays-Bas (acquired by Neopost)
- Instant Luxe – France (acquired by Galeries Lafayette)
- Kiala – Belgium (acquired by UPS)
- Let It Wave – France (acquired by Zoran)
- Mailjet – France (acquired by Mailgun)
- Marco Vasco – France (acquired by Groupe Figaro)
- Mister-auto – France (acquired by PSA)
- Mopub – US (acquired by Twitter)
- Netatmo – France (acquired by Legrand)
- Oodrive – France (acquired by R Capital Management)
- OpenTrust – France (acquired by Keynectis)
- Phone.com – US (listed on NASDAQ – now Openwave)
- QSC – Germany (listed on TecDAX)
- Store Electronic System – France (acquired by LBO France)
- Talend – France (IPO (Nasdaq))
- Vox Mobili – France (acquired by On Mobile)
- Wavecom – France (listed on NASDAQ and Euronext, acquired by Sierra Wireless)
- Zantaz – US (acquired by Autonomy)

== See also ==
- Newfund
