= Per Valebrokk =

Norwegian newspaper editor

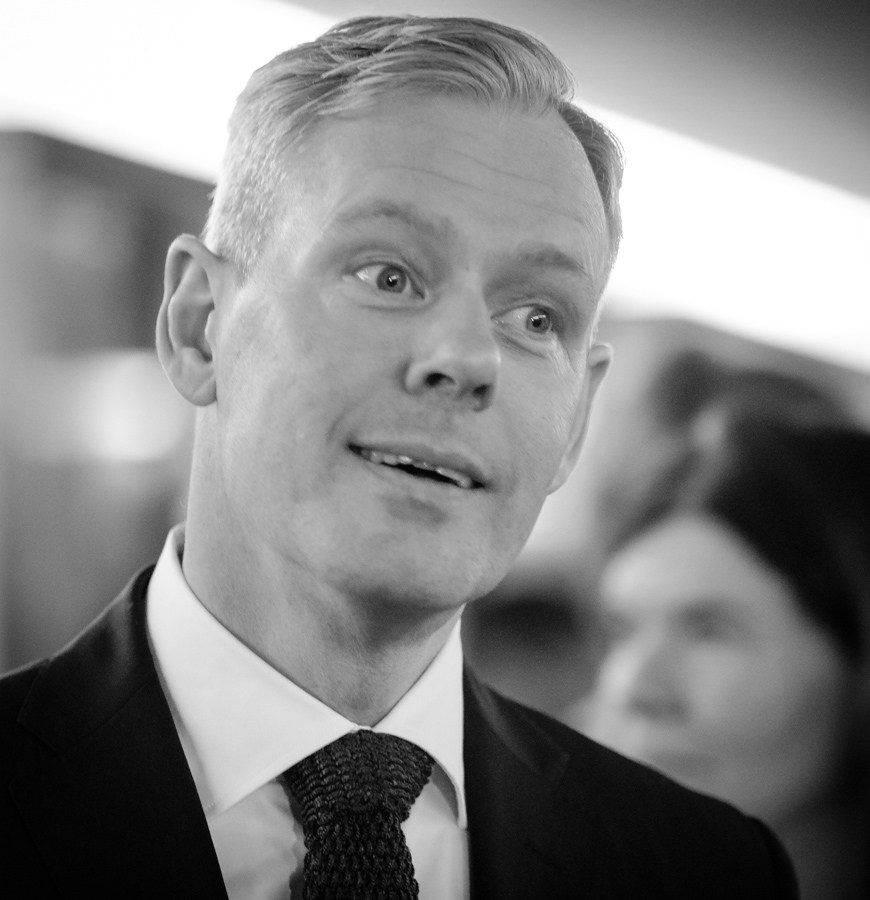

Per Valebrokk (born 1 February 1972) is a Norwegian newspaper editor.

He is the currently partner and senior advisor in the PR agency Storm Communication. He was previously editor-in-chief of E24 Næringsliv. and of Varden, and has also worked in TDN Finans and Verdens Gang. He has a siv.øk. degree.

He is a son of Kåre Valebrokk.
