= Dagens Næringsliv =

Leading Norwegian business newspaper

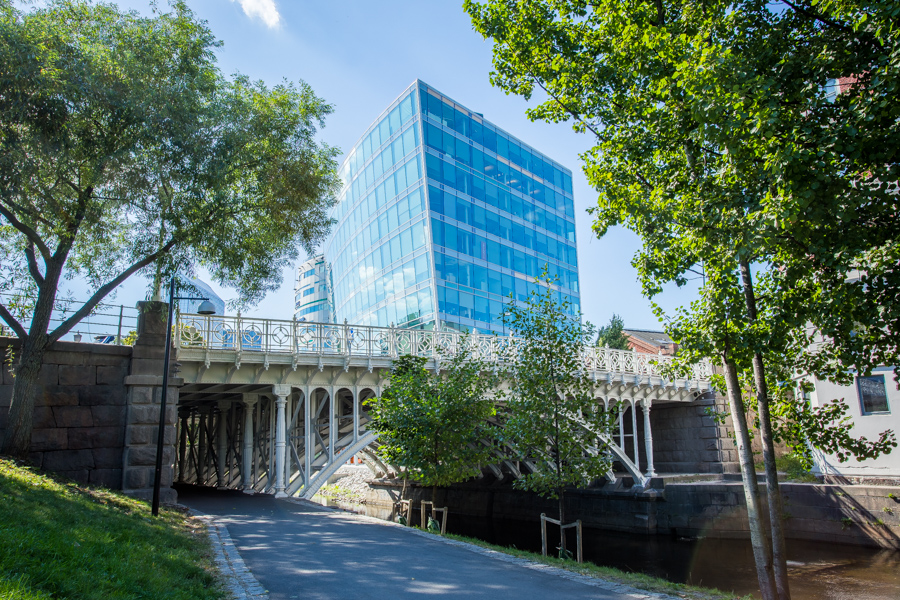
- DN's main editorial offices in Akerselva Atrium in Oslo Dagens Næringsliv
- Type: Daily newspaper
- Format: Tabloid
- Owner: NHST Media Group
- Founder: Magnus Andersen
- Editor-in-chief: Janne Johannessen
- Founded: 1889; 137 years ago
- Political alignment: Independent liberal
- Language: Norwegian
- Headquarters: Oslo
- Circulation: 74 629 (as of 2015)
- Website: www.dn.no

Dagens Næringsliv (DN) ("The Financial Daily", lit. translation "Today's Business Affairs"), is Norway's largest and most influential financial newspaper. As of 2015 it is the third-largest newspaper in Norway by circulation. Editor-in-chief is Janne Johannessen, appointed in December 2021 as the newspaper's first female editor. The weekend edition is supplemented by the lifestyle and culture magazine D2.

Dagens Næringsliv is owned by media conglomerate DN Media Group. It is printed in tabloid from monday to saturday and published digitally. DN has correspondents in New York, Brussels, Stockholm, Phuket, Kristiansand, Stavanger, Bergen, Trondheim and Tromsø. Its main editorial offices are in Oslo.

== History and profile ==
The paper was founded by Magnus Andersen in 1889 as Norges Handels og Sjøfartstidende (Norway's Trade and Seafaring Times), renamed Dagens Næringsliv in 1987. The paper has a liberal political stance and is headquartered in Oslo. The paper is printed in tabloid.

The circulation of Dagens Næringsliv was 69,000 copies in 2003. It rose to 81,391 copies in 2007. The paper had a circulation of 80,595 copies in 2013, which decreased to 79,639 in 2014 and 74,629 in 2015. In recent years, it has surpassed Dagbladet as the third-most circulated newspaper in print in Norway.

=== Partnership with WikiLeaks ===
On 5 September 2013, the newspaper said that it is one of 17 "international partners cooperating with Wikileaks about the Spy Files 3 project that spotlights the international surveillance industry. WikiLeaks has released close to 250 documents about 90 surveillance companies".

== Newspaper inserts ==
=== DN Magasinet ===
DN Magasinet is found at newsstands on Saturdays (and the last day before the public holidays of Easter and Christmas). It can not be purchased separately; it is an insert of Dagens Næringsliv.

=== D2 ===
D2 is a lifestyle magazine, which is an insert of Dagens Næringsliv every Friday. The magazine covers a wide range of cultural and lifestyle-related topics, including art, design, fashion, fitness, travel, cars, technology and food. It has many Norwegian and international prizes for outstanding photography and design. Each issue of D2 is read by 202.000 people.

== Editors ==
- Sea captain Magnus Andersen 1890–1894
- Charles la Cour 1894–1906
- Mons Monsen Mjelde 1906–1910
- Paulus Ludvigsen 1910–1911
- Torjer Meling 1911–1913
- Knut Domaas 1914–1943
- Eivind Thon 1943–1961
- Terje Baalsrud 1961–1978
- Helge Seip 1977–1980
- Arne Hartmark 1980–1982
- Jan Erik Knarbakk 1982–1984
- Eric Cameron 1982–1986
- Kåre Valebrokk 1985–1999, editor-in-chief and chief executive officer
- Amund Djuve 2000–2022, editor-in-chief and chief executive officer
- Janne Johannessen, 2022–, editor-in-chief and chief executive officer

== See also ==
- List of Norwegian newspapers
