= Journal of Industrial Ecology =

- Discipline: Industrial ecology
- Language: English
- Edited by: Reid Lifset

Publication details
- History: 1997-present
- Publisher: Wiley-Blackwell on behalf of Yale University
- Frequency: Bimonthly
- Open access: Hybrid
- Impact factor: 6.946 (2020)

Standard abbreviations
- ISO 4: J. Ind. Ecol.

Indexing
- CODEN: JINEFZ
- ISSN: 1088-1980 (print); 1530-9290 (web)
- LCCN: 97658664
- OCLC no.: 42897623

Links
- Journal homepage; Online access; Online archive

The Journal of Industrial Ecology is a bimonthly peer-reviewed academic journal covering industrial ecology. It is published by Wiley-Blackwell on behalf of the Yale School of the Environment and is an official journal of the International Society for Industrial Ecology. The editor-in-chief is Reid Lifset. According to the Journal Citation Reports, the journal had an impact factor of 6.946 in 2020.

== Abstracting and indexing ==
The journal is abstracted and indexed in:

- ABI/INFORM
- Academic Search
- Elsevier BIOBASE
- Biological Abstracts
- BIOSIS Previews
- CAB Abstracts
- Chemical Abstracts Service
- Compendex
- ProQuest databases
- Current Contents/Agriculture, Biology & Environmental Sciences
- GEOBASE
- Global Health
- International Bibliography of the Social Sciences
- OmniFile
- Public Affairs Information Service
- Science Citation Index Expanded
- Scopus
- VINITI Database RAS
