= Startup studio =

Business model

A startup studio, also known as a startup factory, or a startup foundry, or a venture studio, is a studio-like company that aims at building several startup companies in succession. This style of business building is referred to as "parallel entrepreneurship".

Unlike business incubators and accelerators, venture builders generally don't accept applications, and the companies instead pull business ideas from within the team itself or their close network, and assign internal teams to develop them. Some startup studios also act as early stage venture capitalists.

== History ==
Idealab, founded by Bill Gross in 1996, was one of the first to introduce the 'incubator industry' to the field of technology startups, and has started over 75 companies. Idealab was founded to test many ideas at once and turn the best of them into companies while also attracting the human and financial capital necessary to bring them to the market.

In the wake of the tech revolution in the early 2000s, the startup studio sector experienced a surge in growth. This led to the emergence of several studios, which modeled themselves after Idealab, seeking to demonstrate the efficacy of their successful model. During this era of technological advancements, leading studios like Rocket and Betaworks established themselves as independent entities by launching scalable businesses to meet the growing demand and adapt to the changing landscape.

The startup studio trend gained momentum beginning in 2008. As of 2015, there were over 65 startup studios across the world, of which 17 had been built since 2013. As of 2022 there are more than 780 startup studios across the globe. A 2026 study identified 1,006 startup studios operating worldwide and estimated an annual growth rate of 18%.

== Types ==
There are several types of startup studio models.

=== "Builder" studios ===
A builder startup studio focuses on creating and developing a company, mostly from internal ideas. Notable examples of this model are Atomic, Pioneer Square Labs, Rocket Internet, eFounders, and Cache Ventures.

According to VentureBeat, Nova Spivack was part of the early technologists who pioneered the venture production studio model. He wrote about the model in 2011 at a time when most of its production elements were still in gestation. According to VentureBeat, Nova actually invented the Venture Production Studio term, calling it a 'new approach to building startups.'"

According to Duodeka, venture builders have several advantages over traditional startups:

- higher success and return ratios
- recurring experience captured in playbooks
- access to talent
- flexible skills deployment
- faster market entry and exits
- access to manuals, resources and processes
- a team ready to hit the ground running

=== "Investor" studios ===
Investor venture studios bring in external startups in their idea stage, help them grow by providing them both Venture capital financing, expertise and team building. Studios include Betaworks, Colab (Venture Studio), and Science, Inc. fall in this category.

=== Industry Specialization ===
While early venture studios focused on consumer technology and software, specialized studios have emerged targeting capital-intensive sectors. These studios develop deep expertise in specific industries rather than pursuing broad portfolio diversification. In climate technology, some studios focus exclusively on renewable energy infrastructure, developing systematic processes for identifying bottlenecks where commercial demand exists but execution capacity is lacking. These specialized approaches often involve matching validated opportunities with sector-expert founders rather than traditional entrepreneurs, recognizing that domain expertise may be as critical as entrepreneurial experience in complex industries.

== See also ==
- Business incubator
- Flex space
- Startup company
- Entrepreneurship
- List of venture capital firms
- Angel investor
