= DN Media Group =

Norwegian media conglomerate

DN Media Group AS
- Company type: Private
- Industry: Media
- Founded: 1889
- Founder: Magnus Andersen
- Headquarters: Oslo, Norway
- Area served: Norway
- Key people: James Lamont (CEO); Anette S. Olsen (Chairman)
- Revenue: ▲NOK 1.294 millions (2018)
- Number of employees: 700 (2018)
- Parent: Bonheur (54%)
- Website: www.nhst.no

DN Media Group AS (previously NHST Media Group AS and before that Norges Handels og Sjøfartstidende AS) is a Norwegian media conglomerate that publishes a number of newspapers and online tools. The company dates back to 1889 when it started the predecessor of Dagens Næringsliv. The largest owners of the company are Bonheur ASA (53.99%) and Must Invest (21.75%). The company is listed on the Norwegian OTC.

The company publishes a number of newspapers primarily within business news, including Dagens Næringsliv, TradeWinds, Intrafish, Upstream, Recharge, Europower, Fiskeribladet and Morgenbladet. In addition the group owns two software-as-a-service (SaaS) companies within PR distribution tech and Social Media Monitoring; Mynewsdesk (headquartered in Stockholm, Sweden) and Mention (headquartered in Paris, France).

== History ==
The firm started out as the publisher of what is now called Dagens Næringsliv in 1889, getting the present name in 1987. In 1990 the company established TradeWinds and in 1993 TDN Power, now EuroPower. In 1996 Upstream was launched while Fiskaren and IntraFish.com were bought in 2001. In 2005 Business was bought and relaunched as Dagens it. The group's history is described in journalist Morten Møst's book Making Waves: The history of NHST Media Group (2015).

In February 2023, the firm changed its name to DN Media Group.
