= International Society for Industrial Ecology =

- Formation: February 2001
- Type: Professional society
- Website: http://www.is4ie.org

The International Society for Industrial Ecology (ISIE) is an international professional organization with the aim of promoting the development and application of industrial ecology. The ISIE supports the development and application of industrial ecology. It promotes the use of systems-based approaches to study the flows of materials and energy in society, with the aim of addressing sustainability challenges and supporting the transition toward a circular economy. The ISIE connects researchers, policymakers, engineers, and practitioners to facilitate the integration of environmental considerations into economic activities. Its mission includes advancing industrial ecology in areas such as research, education, public policy, and industrial practices.

== History ==
The decision to found ISIE was made in January 2000 at the New York Academy of Sciences in a meeting devoted to industrial ecology attended by experts from diverse fields. The society formally opened its doors to membership in February 2001.

The origins of industrial ecology can be traced back to the late 18th century with early concerns about the relationship between population growth and resource limits, such as those expressed by Thomas Malthus. Over the following two centuries, influential concepts like the Tragedy of the Commons, Spaceship Earth, The Limits to Growth, and Sustainable Development shaped thinking on the environment and systems-level sustainability.

A significant milestone occurred in 1989 with the publication of an article by Robert Frosch and Nicholas E. Gallopoulos in Scientific American, titled "Strategies for Manufacturing". In the article, the authors proposed the idea of an "industrial ecosystem" where the use of materials and energy is optimized, waste and pollution are minimized, and all by-products have potential value. Their vision helped launch the field of industrial ecology and inspired a symposium by the U.S. National Academy of Sciences in the early 1990s that is often cited as a founding event for the discipline.

Around the same time, Thomas E. Graedel and Braden R. Allenby offered a widely used definition of industrial ecology, describing it as a systems-based approach to sustainability that seeks to optimize material and energy flows across the entire life cycle of products, from raw materials to disposal.

Throughout the 1990s, industrial ecology evolved through academic initiatives in Europe, North America, and Asia. The field's growing visibility was marked by Gordon Research Conferences and dedicated sessions at scientific meetings. In 1997, the Journal of Industrial Ecology was established, becoming a key academic outlet for the field. It is published by Yale University's Center for Industrial Ecology in collaboration with the Norwegian University of Science and Technology (NTNU) and Tsinghua University.

In 2003, NTNU launched the first doctoral program in industrial ecology, followed by a master's program in 2004. Leiden University and Delft University of Technology jointly began offering a master’s degree in industrial ecology in 2005. Today, industrial ecology is taught globally through dedicated degree programs or integrated into environmental engineering and interdisciplinary curricula.

During the 2010s, the concept of the circular economy gained prominence in academic, policy, and business communities. It incorporates many principles rooted in industrial ecology, including life cycle thinking, closed-loop systems, design for the environment, and industrial symbiosis. Numerous circular economy initiatives have been developed by or in collaboration with industrial ecologists, and the field continues to supply expertise and trained professionals to circular economy efforts around the world.

== Membership ==
The ISIE offers three types of memberships: Regular, Young Professional, and Student. Membership categories and fees vary based on the member's country of residence, following the World Bank's Atlas method for classifying income levels.

Student memberships are available to all currently enrolled university students. Young Professional memberships are available to individuals who graduated from their most recent degree within the past three years. Regular memberships apply to all other individuals.

Annual membership fees (in euros; estimated USD equivalents in parentheses)
Membership type	High income	Upper-middle income	Lower-middle income	Low income
Regular	€150 ($165)	€120 ($132)	€75 ($83)	€55 ($61)
Young Professional	€120 ($132)	€90 ($99)	€60 ($66)	€40 ($44)
Student	€15 ($17)	€10 ($11)	€5 ($6)	€0 ($0)

Memberships registered or renewed before October 1st extend to December 31st of the following year. ISIE also holds tax-exempt status in the United Kingdom as of April 6, 2023, which may be relevant for reimbursement by UK institutions.

== Leadership ==
The International Society for Industrial Ecology is governed by an elected President and a Board. Recent presidents of ISIE include:

- 2025–2027: Arnold Tukker (Leiden University)
- 2023–2025: Ming Xu (Tsinghua University)
- 2021–2023: Stefanie Hellweg (ETH Zurich)
- 2019–2021: Heinz Schandl (CSIRO Australia)

(*Source: Internal records of the society, as of May 2025*)

== Conferences ==
The ISIE organizes biennial conferences that bring together scholars, practitioners, and policymakers to discuss advances in industrial ecology. Recent and past ISIE biennial conferences have been held at the following locations:

- ISIE 2025 – Singapore (June 30 – July 4, 2025)
- ISIE 2023 – Leiden, Netherlands (July 2–5, 2023)
- ISIE 2019 – Beijing, China (July 7–11, 2019)
- ISIE/ISSST 2017 Joint Conference – Chicago, United States (June 25–29, 2017)
- ISIE 2015 – Guildford, England (July 7–10, 2015)
- ISIE 2013 – Ulsan, South Korea (June 25–28, 2013)
- ISIE 2011 – Berkeley, United States (June 7–10, 2011)
- ISIE 2009 – Lisbon, Portugal (June 21–24, 2009)
- ISIE 2007 – Toronto, Canada (June 17–20, 2007)
- ISIE 2005 – Stockholm, Sweden (June 12–15, 2005)
- ISIE 2003 – Ann Arbor, United States (June 30 – July 2, 2003)
- ISIE 2001 – Leiden, Netherlands (November 12–14, 2001)
