= Dario Tamburrano =

Italian politician

Dario Tamburrano MEP
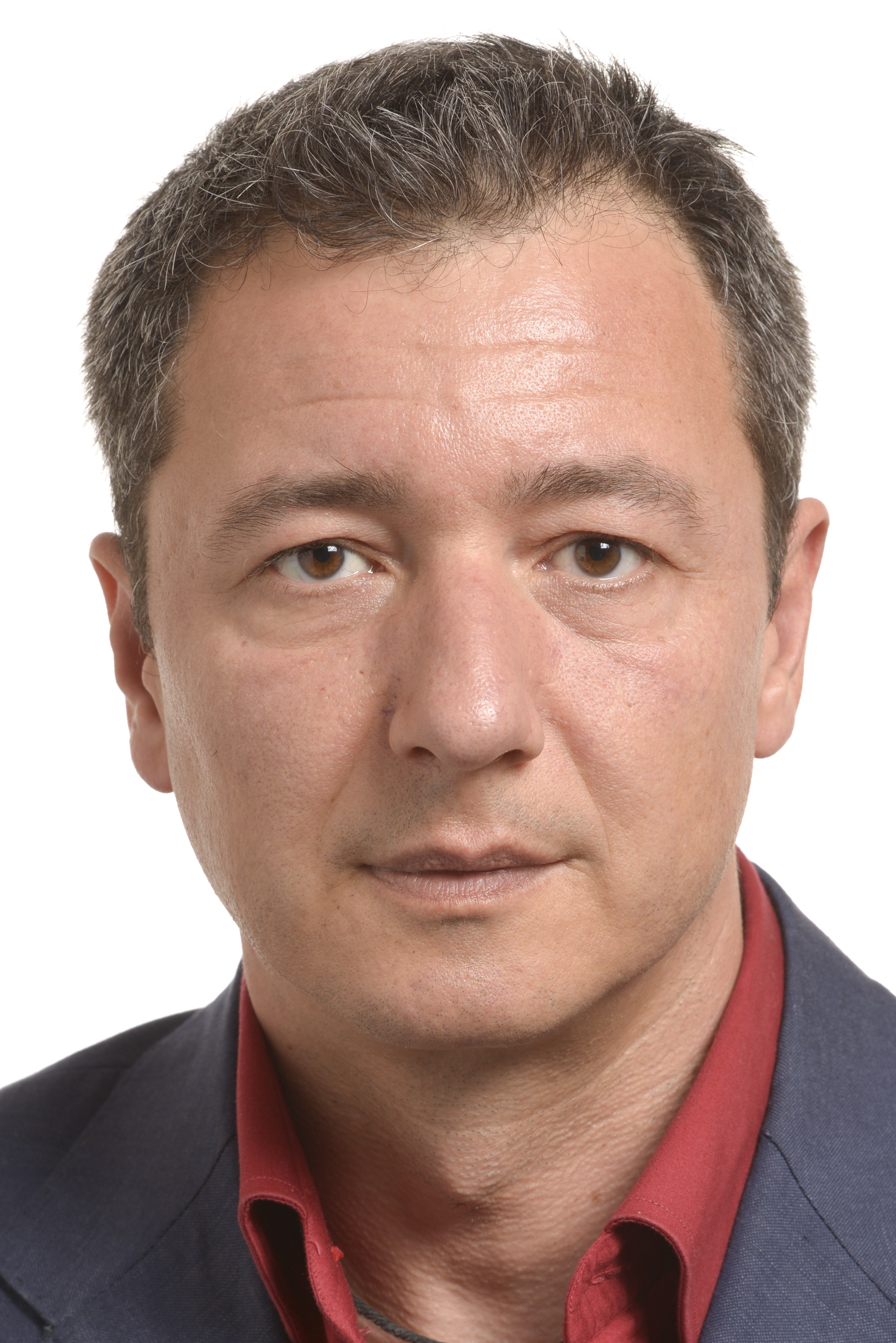

Member of the European Parliament for Central Italy
- In office 1 July 2014 – 1 July 2019
- Parliamentary group: Europe of Freedom and Direct Democracy
- Incumbent
- Assumed office 16 July 2024
- Parliamentary group: The Left

Personal details
- Born: 27 August 1969 (age 56) Rome, Lazio, Italy
- Party: Five Star Movement
- Occupation: Odontologist; Politician

Dario Tamburrano (born 27 August 1969) is an Italian politician and environmentalist who was elected as an MEP from Central Italy in the 8th and 10th European parliament.

== Biography ==
Born in Rome on 27 August 1969, he graduated from "Amedeo Avogadro" High School with full marks (60/60). He studied Dentistry and dental prosthesis at the Sapienza University of Rome and graduated in 1996 with highest honors presenting a thesis on "Dental Management of the HIV+ child". Since 1996, he is working in Rome as a freelance dentist specialised in endodontics, laser dentistry, implant prosthetics and aesthetics dentistry. In his profession, he values the human relationship with the patients. As an environmentalist, he was one of the first member of the Meetup (website), related to Beppe Grillo and the Five Star Movement (Movimento Cinque Stelle, M5S).

In May 2014, he was elected Members of European Parliament (MEP) for the Five Star Movement (Movimento Cinque Stelle, M5S).

== Political activity ==
He joined the Five Star Movement at the end of 2005. Since 2006 he is a member of the Meetup Sostenibilità e Decrescita (Meetup Sustainability and De-Growth), Meetup di Roma (Meetup of Rome) and Meetup Nazionale Gruppo 280 (The National Meetup Group 280), where he had the role of assistant organizer, promoter and manager of the environmental and translation groups. In 2007, he was co-organizer of the V-Day, promoted by Beppe Grillo.

Since 2007, he contributes to the Five Star Movement in Rome on environmental, food security and circular economy matters. In 2008, he was the first signatory of the three referendums on "Free information in a free state" together with Beppe Grillo (2nd V-day). In the same year, he contributed to the creation and the campaign support of the non-party list "Amici di Beppe Grillo" (Friends of Beppe Grillo) for the municipal elections in Rome. In 2013, he volunteered as assistant in the parliamentary group of the Five Star Movement in one of the Chambers of the Italian Parliament (Camera dei Deputati).

In May 2014, he was elected as one of the 17 Members of European Parliament (MEP) of the Five Star Movement (Movimento Cinque Stelle, M5S) in the Europe of Freedom and Direct Democracy Group (EFDD).

He is serving as full member in the Industry, Research and Energy Committee (ITRE), full member of EU-Russia Parliamentary Cooperation Delegation (D-RU), substitute member of the Agriculture and Rural Development Committee (AGRI), substitute member of the Delegation to the EU-Ukraine Parliamentary Cooperation (D-UA) and substitute member of the Euronest Parliamentary Assembly (DEPA).

Since 15 January 2015, he is vice-president of the Intergroup at the European Parliament “Common Goods and Public Services” (https://web.archive.org/web/20161124034053/http://commonseurope.eu/)

Since July 2015, he is member of the Science and Technology Options Assessment of the European Parliament (STOA) and of the European Forum for Renewable Energy Sources EUROFORES’s Extended Board.

== Civic, environmental and cultural activities ==
He translated into Italian the following publications and videos, many of which can be consulted on a dedicated website:

- Lester Brown: "Plan B 3.0: Mobilizing to Save Civilization", Piano B 3.0-Mobilitarsi per salvare la civiltà, Edizioni Ambiente 2008;
- Lester Brown: "Plan B 4.0: Mobilizing to Save Civilization"Piano B 4.0-Mobilitarsi per salvare la civiltà, Edizioni Ambiente 2009;
- Paul Hawken: "Blessed Unrest: How the Largest Movement in the World Came into Being and Why No One Saw It Coming", Moltitudine Inarrestabile. Come è nato il più grande movimento al mondo e perché nessuno se ne è accorto, Edizioni Ambiente 2009;
- Richard Heinberg, Michael Bomford: "The Food & Farming Transition: Toward a Post Carbon Food System", La transizione agroalimentare, verso un modello indipendente dai combustibili fossili, Post Carbon Institute 2009;
- Rebecca Hosking: "A farm for the future", Una fattoria per il futuro, BBC documentary 2010;
- Daniel Lerch: "Post Carbon Cities: Planning for Energy and Climate Uncertainty", Post Carbon Cities. Come affrontare l’incertezza energetica e climatica. Una guida al Picco del petrolio e al riscaldamento globale per gli amministratori locali, Post Carbon Institute 2011;
- David Fleming and Shaun Chamberlin: "TEQs (Tradable Energy Quotas): A Policy Framework for Peak Oil and Climate Change", TEQs: politiche di decrescita emissiva ed energetica per l’epoca del Picco del petrolio e dei Cambiamenti climatici, House of Commons 2011;
- Lester Brown: "Full Planet, Empty Plates: The New Geopolitics of Food Scarcity",Nove miliardi di posti a tavola. La nuova geopolitica della scarsità alimentare, Edizioni Ambiente 2012;
- Jorgen Randers: 2052: A Global Forecast for the Next Forty Years, Scenari globali per i prossimi 40 anni, Edizioni Ambiente 2013;
- Asher Miller and Rob Hopkins: "Climate after Growth: Why Environmentalists Must Embrace Post-Growth Economics and Community Resilience", Scenari dopo la crescita, Post Carbon Institute 2014;
- Benoit Thévard: "Europe facing peak oil", L’Europa di fronte al picco del petrolio.

In January 2009, he became a co-founder of the Circolo delle Decrescita Felice di Roma (Club of Happy De-Growth) and of the Transition Italia movement (Italian node of the Transition Network). In 2009, he joined three organisations: ASPO Italia (National Department of Association for the Study of Peak Oil and Gas), Archipelago (SCEC) and ISDE (International Society of Doctors for the Environment). Between 2009 and 2012 he also published several articles in the Italian online magazine Il cambiamento . In 2012, he also participated in a documentary by Roberto Cavallo Meno 100 chili, Ricette per la dieta della nostra pattumiera tratto dall’omonimo testo ( Edizioni Ambiente 2012).

== Curiosities ==
- Since 2007, following the translation of an essay by Lester Brown, he began to cultivate mushrooms and an urban garden on his terrace in Rome.
- Besides his activism, Tamburrano cultivates a vegetable garden and organic saffron in his family country house located in San Giovanni a Piro (national park of Cilento, Italy).
