= Sustainability and systemic change resistance =

Resistance to environmentalism

The environmental sustainability problem has proven difficult to solve. The modern environmental movement has attempted to solve the problem in a large variety of ways. But little progress has been made, as shown by severe ecological footprint overshoot and lack of sufficient progress on the climate change problem. Something within the human system is preventing change to a sustainable mode of behavior. That system trait is systemic change resistance. Change resistance is also known as organizational resistance, barriers to change, or policy resistance.

== Overview of resistance to solving the sustainability problem ==
While environmentalism had long been a minor force in political change, the movement strengthened significantly in the 1970s with the first Earth Day in 1970, in which over 20 million people participated, with publication of The Limits to Growth in 1972, and with the first United Nations Conference on the Human Environment in Stockholm in 1972. Early expectations the problem could be solved ran high. 114 out of 132 members of the United Nations attended the Stockholm conference. The conference was widely seen at the time as a harbinger of success:

"Many believe the most important result of the conference was the precedent it set for international cooperation in addressing environmental degradation. The nations attending agreed they shared responsibility for the quality of the environment, particularly the oceans and the atmosphere, and they signed a declaration of principles, after extensive negotiations, concerning their obligations. The conference also approved an environmental fund and an 'action program,' which involved 200 specific recommendations for addressing such problems as global climate change, marine pollution, population growth, the dumping of toxic wastes, and the preservation of biodiversity. A permanent environment unit was established for coordinating these and other international efforts. [This later became] the United Nations Environmental Program [which was] formally approved by the General Assembly later that same year and its base established in Nairobi, Kenya. This organization not only coordinated action but monitored research, collecting and disseminating information, and it has played an ongoing role in international negotiations about environmental issues.

"The conference in Stockholm accomplished almost everything the preparatory committed had planned. It was widely considered successful, and many observers were almost euphoric about the extent of agreement."

However, despite the work of a worldwide environmental movement, many national environmental protection agencies, creation of the United Nations Environment Programme, and many international environmental treaties, the sustainability problem continues to grow worse. The latest ecological footprint data shows the world's footprint increased from about 50% undershoot in 1961 to 50% overshoot in 2007, the last year data is available.

In 1972 the first edition of The Limits to Growth analyzed the environmental sustainability problem using a system dynamics model. The widely influential book predicted that:

"If the present trends in world population, industrialization, pollution, food production, and resource depletion continue unchanged, the limits to growth on this planet will be reached sometime within the next one hundred years. The most probable result will be a rather sudden and uncontrollable decline in both population and industrial capacity some time in the 21st century."

Yet thirty-two years later in 2004 the third edition reported that:

"[The second edition of Limits to Growth] was published in 1992, the year of the global summit on environment and development in Rio de Janeiro. The advent of the summit seemed to prove that global society had decided to deal seriously with the important environmental problems. But we now know that humanity failed to achieve the goals of Rio. The Rio plus 10 conference in Johannesburg in 2002 produced even less; it was almost paralyzed by a variety of ideological and economic disputes, [due to] the efforts of those pursuing their narrow national, corporate, or individual self-interests.

"...humanity has largely squandered the past 30 years."

Change resistance runs so high that the world's top two greenhouse gas emitters, China and the United States, have never adopted the Kyoto Protocol treaty. In the US resistance was so strong that in 1999 the US Senate voted 95 to zero against the treaty by passing the Byrd–Hagel Resolution, despite the fact Al Gore was vice-president at the time. Not a single senator could be persuaded to support the treaty, which has not been brought back to the floor since.

Due to prolonged change resistance, the climate change problem has escalated to the climate change crisis. Greenhouse gas emissions are rising much faster than IPCC models expected: "The growth rate of [fossil fuel] emissions was 3.5% per year for 2000-2007, an almost four fold increase from 0.9% per year in 1990-1999. … This makes current trends in emissions higher than the worst case IPCC-SRES scenario."

The Copenhagen Climate Summit of December 2009 ended in failure. No agreement on binding targets was reached. The Cancun Climate Summit in December 2010 did not break the deadlock. The best it could do was another non-binding agreement:

"Recognizing that climate change represents an urgent and potentially irreversible threat to human societies and the planet, and thus requires to be urgently addressed by all Parties."

This indicates no progress at all since 1992, when the United Nations Framework Convention on Climate Change was created at the Earth Summit in Rio de Janeiro. The 2010 Cancun agreement was the functional equivalent of what the 1992 agreement said:

"The Parties to this Convention... [acknowledge] that the global nature of climate change calls for the widest possible cooperation by all countries and their participation in an effective and appropriate international response.... [thus the parties recognize] that States should enact effective environmental legislation... [to] protect the climate system for the benefit of present and future generations of humankind...."

Negotiations have bogged down so pervasively that: "Climate policy is gridlocked, and there's virtually no chance of a breakthrough." "Climate policy, as it has been understood and practised by many governments of the world under the Kyoto Protocol approach, has failed to produce any discernible real world reductions in emissions of greenhouse gases in fifteen years."

== The change resistance and proper coupling subproblems ==
Understanding change resistance requires seeing it as a distinct and separate part of the sustainability problem. Tanya Markvart's 2009 thesis on Understanding Institutional Change and Resistance to Change Towards Sustainability stated that:

"It has also been demonstrated that ecologically destructive and inequitable institutional systems can be highly resilient and resistant to change, even in the face of social-ecological degradation and/or collapse (e.g., Berkes & Folke, 2002; Allison & Hobbs, 2004; Brown, 2005; Runnalls, 2008; Finley, 2009; Walker et al., 2009)."

The thesis focuses specifically on developing "an interdisciplinary theoretical framework for understanding institutional change and resistance to change towards sustainability."

Jack Harich's 2010 paper on Change Resistance as the Crux of the Environmental Sustainability Problem argues there are two separate problems to solve. A root cause analysis and a system dynamics model were used to explain how:

"...difficult social problems [like sustainability must be decomposed] into two sequential subproblems: (1) How to overcome change resistance and then (2) How to achieve proper coupling. This is the timeless strategy of divide and conquer. By cleaving one big problem into two, the problem becomes an order of magnitude easier to solve, because we can approach the two subproblems differently and much more appropriately. We are no longer unknowingly attempting to solve two very different problems simultaneously."

The paper discussed the two subproblems:

"Change resistance is the tendency for a system to continue its current behavior, despite the application of force to change that behavior.

"Proper coupling occurs when the behavior of one system affects the behavior of other systems in a desirable manner, using the appropriate feedback loops, so the systems work together in harmony in accordance with design objectives. … In the environmental sustainability problem the human system has become improperly coupled to the greater system it lives within: the environment.

"Change resistance versus proper coupling allows a crucial distinction. Society is aware of the proper practices required to live sustainably and the need to do so. But society has a strong aversion to adopting these practices. As a result, problem solvers have created thousands of effective (and often ingenious) proper practices. But they are stymied in their attempts to have them taken up by enough of the system to solve the problem because an 'implicit system goal' is causing insurmountable change resistance. Therefore systemic change resistance is the crux of the problem and must be solved first."

The proper coupling subproblem is what most people consider as "the" problem to solve. It is called decoupling in economic and environmental fields, where the term refers to economic growth without additional environmental degradation. Solving the proper coupling problem is the goal of environmentalism and in particular ecological economics: "Ecological economics is the study of the interactions and co-evolution in time and space of human economies and the ecosystems in which human economies are embedded."

Change resistance is also called barriers to change. Hoffman and Bazerman, in a chapter on "Understanding and overcoming the organizational and psychological barriers to action", concluded that:

"In this chapter, we argue that the change in thinking required of the sustainability agenda will never come to fruition within practical domains unless proper attention is given to the sources of individual and social resistance to such change. The implementation of wise management practices cannot be accomplished without a concurrent set of strategies for surmounting these barriers."

John Sterman, current leader of the system dynamics school of thought, came to the same conclusion:

"The civil rights movement provides a better analogy for the climate challenge. Then, as now, entrenched special interests vigorously opposed change. … Of course, we need more research and technical innovation—money and genius are always in short supply. But there is no purely technical solution for climate change. For public policy to be grounded in the hard-won results of climate science, we must now turn our attention to the dynamics of social and political change."

These findings indicate there are at least two subproblems to be solved: change resistance and proper coupling. Given the human system's long history of unsuccessful attempts to self-correct to a sustainable mode, it appears that high change resistance is preventing proper coupling. This may be expressed as an emerging principle: systemic change resistance is the crux of the sustainability problem and must be solved first, before the human system can be properly coupled to the greater system it lives within, the environment.

== Systemic versus individual change resistance ==
Systemic change resistance differs significantly from individual change resistance. "Systemic means originating from the system in such a manner as to affect the behavior of most or all social agents of certain types, as opposed to originating from individual agents." Individual change resistance originates from individual people and organizations. How the two differ may be seen in this passage:

"The notion of resistance to change is credited to Kurt Lewin. His conceptualization of the phrase, however, is very different from today's usage. [which treats resistance to change as a psychological concept, where resistance or support of change comes from values, habits, mental models, and so on residing within the individual] For Lewin, resistance to change could occur, but that resistance could be anywhere in the system. As Kotter (1995) found, it is possible for the resistance to be sited within the individual, but it is much more likely to be found elsewhere in the system.

"Systems of social roles, with their associated patterns of attitudes, expectations, and behavior norms, share with biological systems the characteristic of homeostasis—i.e., tendencies to resist change, to restore the previous state after a disturbance.

"Lewin had been working on this idea, that the status quo represented an equilibrium between the barriers to change and the forces favoring change, since 1928 as part of his field theory. He believed that some difference in these forces—weakening of the barriers or strengthening of the driving forces—was required to produce the unfreezing that began a change."

If sources of systemic change resistance are present, they are the principal cause of individual change resistance. According to the fundamental attribution error it is crucial to address systemic change resistance when present and avoid assuming that change resistance can be overcome by bargaining, reasoning, inspirational appeals, and so on. This is because:

"A fundamental principle of system dynamics states that the structure of the system gives rise to its behavior. However, people have a strong tendency to attribute the behavior of others to dispositional rather than situational factors, that is, to character and especially character flaws rather than the system in which these people are acting. The tendency to blame the person rather than the system is so strong psychologists call it the 'fundamental attribution error.' "

Peter Senge, a thought leader of systems thinking for the business world, describes the structural source of systemic change resistance as being due to an "implicit system goal:"

"In general, balancing loops are more difficult to see than reinforcing loops because it often looks like nothing is happening. There's no dramatic growth of sales and marketing expenditures, or nuclear arms, or lily pads. Instead, the balancing process maintains the status quo, even when all participants want change. The feeling, as Lewis Carroll's Queen of Hearts put it, of needing 'all the running you can do to keep in the same place' is a clue that a balancing loop may exist nearby.

"Leaders who attempt organizational change often find themselves unwittingly caught in balancing processes. To the leaders, it looks as though their efforts are clashing with sudden resistance that seems to come from nowhere. In fact, as my friend found when he tried to reduce burnout, the resistance is a response by the system, trying to maintain an implicit system goal. Until this goal is recognized, the change effort is doomed to failure."

Senge's insight applies to the sustainability problem. Until the "implicit system goal" causing systemic change resistance is found and resolved, change efforts to solve the proper coupling part of the sustainability problem may be, as Senge argues, "doomed to failure".

== Focus is on proper coupling ==
Presently environmentalism is focused on solving the proper coupling subproblem. For example, the following are all proper coupling solutions. They attempt to solve the direct cause of the sustainability problem's symptoms:

- The Kyoto Protocol
- The Three Rs of reduce, reuse, recycle
- More use of renewable energy
- Better pollution control of many kinds
- Collective management of common-pool resources
- Certification programs to reduce deforestation such as PEFC and FSC
- Contour farming to reduce soil erosion
- The green revolution
- Zero population growth

The direct cause of environmental impact is the three factors on the right side of the I=PAT equation where Impact equals Population times Affluence (consumption per person) times Technology (environmental impact per unit of consumption). It is these three factors that solutions like those listed above seek to reduce.

The top environmental organization in the world, the United Nations Environmental Programme (UNEP), focuses exclusively on proper coupling solutions:

"2010 marked the beginning of a period of new, strategic and transformational direction for UNEP as it began implementing its Medium Term Strategy (MTS) for 2010-2013 across six areas: Climate change; Disasters and conflicts; Ecosystem management; Environmental governance; Harmful substances and hazardous waste; Resource efficiency, Sustainable consumption and production."

The six areas are all direct practices to reduce the three factors of the I=PAT equation.

Al Gore's 2006 documentary film An Inconvenient Truth described the climate change problem and the urgency of solving it. The film concluded with Gore saying:

"Each one of us is a cause of global warming, but each one of us can make choices to change that with the things we buy, the electricity we use, the cars we drive; we can make choices to bring our individual carbon emissions to zero. The solutions are in our hands, we just have to have the determination to make it happen. We have everything that we need to reduce carbon emissions, everything but political will. But in America, the will to act is a renewable resource."

The four solutions Gore mentions are proper coupling practices. There is, however, a hint of acknowledgement that overcoming systemic change resistance is the real challenge, when Gore says "...we just have to have the determination to make it happen. We have everything that we need to reduce carbon emissions, everything but political will."

The twenty-seven solutions that appear during the film's closing credits are mostly proper coupling solutions. The first nine are:

- Go to www.climatecrisis.net
- You can reduce your carbon emissions. In fact, you can even reduce your carbon emissions to zero.
- Buy energy efficient appliances & light bulbs.
- Change your thermostat (and use clock thermostats) to reduce energy for heating & cooling.
- Weatherize your house, increase insulation, get an energy audit.
- Recycle.
- If you can, buy a hybrid car.
- When you can, walk or ride a bicycle.
- Where you can, use light rail & mass transit.

Some solutions are attempts to overcome individual change resistance, such as:

- Tell your parents not to ruin the world that you will live in.
- If you are a parent, join with your children to save the world they will live in.
- Vote for leaders who pledge to solve this crisis.
- Write to congress. If they don't listen, run for congress.
- Speak up in your community.

However, none of the 27 solutions deal with overcoming systemic change resistance.

== Overcoming systemic change resistance ==
Efforts here are sparse because environmentalism is currently not oriented toward treating systemic change resistance as a distinct and separate problem to solve.

On how to specifically overcome the change resistance subproblem, Markvart examined two leading theories that seemed to offer insight into change resistance, Panarchy theory and New Institutionalism, and concluded that:

"...neither theory devotes significant attention to understanding the dynamics of resilient and resistant but inefficient and/or unproductive institutional and ecological systems. Overall, more research is required...."

Taking a root cause analysis and system dynamics modeling approach, Harich carefully defined the three characteristics of a root cause and then found a main systemic root cause for both the change resistance and proper coupling subproblems. Several sample solution elements for resolving the root causes were suggested. The point was made that the exact solution policies chosen do not matter nearly as much as finding the correct systemic root causes. Once these are found, how to resolve them is relatively obvious because once a root cause is found by structural modeling, the high leverage point for resolving it follows easily. Solutions may then push on specific structural points in the social system, which due to careful modeling will have fairly predictable effects.

This reaffirms the work of Donella Meadows, as expressed in her classic essay on Leverage Points: Places to Intervene in a System. The final page stated that:

"The higher the leverage point, the more the system will resist changing it."

Here Meadows refers to the leverage point for resolving the proper coupling subproblem rather than the leverage point for overcoming change resistance. This is because the current focus of environmentalism is on proper coupling.

However, if the leverage points associated with the root causes of change resistance exist and can be found, the system will not resist changing them. This is an important principle of social system behavior.

For example, Harich found the main root cause of successful systemic change resistance to be high "deception effectiveness." The source was special interests, particularly large for-profit corporations. The high leverage point was raising "general ability to detect manipulative deception." This can be done with a variety of solution elements, such as "The Truth Test." This effectively increases truth literacy, just as conventional education raises reading and writing literacy. Few citizens resist literacy education because its benefits have become so obvious.

Promotion of corporate social responsibility (CSR) has been used to try to overcome change resistance to solving social problems, including environmental sustainability. This solution strategy has not worked well because it is voluntary and does not resolve root causes. Milton Friedman explained why CSR fails: "The social responsibility of business is to increase profits." Business cannot be responsible to society. It can only be responsible to its shareholders.

== See also ==
- The Corporation
