= Beyond the Limits =

1992 book by Donella Meadows, Dennis Meadows and Jørgen Randers

- First edition cover
- Author: Donella Meadows; Dennis Meadows; Jørgen Randers
- Subject: Environment
- Publisher: Chelsea Green Publishing
- Publication date: 1992
- ISBN: 0-930031-62-8
- OCLC: 48886446

Beyond the Limits is a 1992 book continuing the modeling of the consequences of a rapidly growing global population that was started in the 1972 report The Limits to Growth. Donella Meadows, Dennis Meadows, and Jørgen Randers are the authors and all were involved in the original Club of Rome study as well. Beyond the Limits (Chelsea Green Publishing Company) and Earthscan addressed many of the criticisms of The Limits to Growth book, but still has caused controversy and mixed reactions.

== Influence ==
Billionaire investor Richard Rainwater indicates having been influenced to invest in oil in the 1990s upon reading Beyond the Limits. His niece Kelley Rainwater reports she gave him this book as a Christmas present. She was introduced to the book through Dr. Jay Earley who is a social transformation theorist and colleague of the Meadows.

== See also ==
- Donella Meadows' twelve leverage points to intervene in a system
- World3
- Steady-state economy
- Peak oil
- The Limits to Growth
- The Ultimate Resource
