= Systems thinking =

Examining complex systems as a whole

Impression of systems thinking about society

Systems thinking is a way of making sense of the complexity of the world by looking at it in terms of wholes and relationships rather than by splitting it down into its parts. It has been used as a way of exploring and developing effective action in complex contexts, enabling systems change. Systems thinking draws on and contributes to conceptual systems, systems theory, and the system sciences.

== History ==
=== Systems in physics ===
The word system has several overlapping meanings in the history of science. In 1674, Robert Hooke used the term "System of the World" to describe how planets relate to the fixed stars mapped out by the catalogue of Hipparchus or Ptolemy's Almagest. He also used it to compare the Ptolemaic and Copernican models of the cosmos. In 1687, Isaac Newton answered Hooke's ideas in the third book of his Principia Mathematica, also titled The System of the World. Newton shifted the definition, describing the universe not as a visual arrangement of stars, but as a mechanical, physical system governed by gravity. This approach continues as the field of dynamical systems to this day, where a system of equations is solved to predict how objects move.

=== Feedback control systems ===
System output can be controlled with feedback.

By 1824, the Carnot cycle presented an engineering challenge, which was how to maintain the operating temperatures of the hot and cold working fluids of the physical plant. In 1868, James Clerk Maxwell presented a framework for, and a limited solution to, the problem of controlling the rotational speed of a physical plant. Maxwell's solution echoed James Watt's (1784) centrifugal moderator (denoted as element Q) for maintaining (but not enforcing) the constant speed of a physical plant (that is, Q represents a moderator, but not a governor, by Maxwell's definition). (Note: A solution to the equations for a dynamical system can be afflicted by instability or oscillation. The Governor: A corrective action against error can solve the dynamical equation by integrating the error.)

Maxwell's approach, which linearized the equations of motion of the system, produced a tractable method of solution. Norbert Wiener identified this approach as an influence on his studies of cybernetics (Note: "cybernetics: see system science."; "system science: —the systematized knowledge of systems") during World War II and Wiener even proposed treating some subsystems under investigation as black boxes. Methods for solutions of the systems of equations then become the subject of study, as in feedback control systems, in stability theory, in constraint satisfaction problems, the unification algorithm, type inference, and so forth.

Systems thinking, born from the visionary contributions of theoretical biologist Ludwig von Bertalanffy, computer scientist Jay Forrester, and their contemporaries, reached its zenith in the 1990s with the release of Peter Senge’s seminal work, The Fifth Discipline, a landmark in intellectual exploration.

=== Applications ===
"So, how do we change the structure of systems to produce more of what we want and less of that which is undesirable? ... MIT’s Jay Forrester likes to say that the average manager can ... guess with great accuracy where to look for leverage points—places in the system where a small change could lead to a large shift in behavior".— Donella Meadows, (2008) Thinking In Systems: A Primer p.145 (Note: Donella Meadows, Thinking In Systems: A Primer Overview, in video clips: Chapter 1 Chapter 2, part 1 Chapter 2, part 2 Chapter 3 Chapter 4 Chapter 5 Chapter 6 Chapter 7)

== Characteristics ==
System boundary in context

System input and output allows exchange of energy and information across boundary.

...What is a system? A system is a set of things ... interconnected in such a way that they produce their own pattern of behavior over time. ... But the system’s response to these forces is characteristic of itself, and that response is seldom simple in the real world

— Donella Meadows

[a system] is "an integrated whole even though composed of diverse, interacting, specialized structures and subjunctions"

— IEEE (1972)

"a system is a collection of things that are interconnected and interdependent from which stuff emerges"

-Walls & Flach (2025)

- Subsystems serve as part of a larger system, but each comprises a system in its own right. Each frequently can be described reductively, with properties obeying its own laws, such as Newton's System of the World, in which entire planets, stars, and their satellites can be treated, sometimes in a scientific way as dynamical systems, entirely mathematically, as demonstrated by Johannes Kepler's equation (1619) for the orbit of Mars before Newton's Principia appeared in 1687.
- Black boxes are subsystems whose operation can be characterized by their inputs and outputs, without regard to further detail.

=== Particular systems ===
- Political systems were recognized as early as the millennia before the common era.
- Biological systems were recognized in Aristotle's lagoon ca. 350 BCE.
- Economic systems were recognized by 1776.
- Social systems were recognized by the 19th and 20th centuries of the common era.
- Radar systems were developed in World War II in subsystem fashion; they were made up of transmitter, receiver, power supply, and signal processing subsystems, to defend against airborne attacks.
- Dynamical systems of ordinary differential equations were shown to exhibit stable behavior given a suitable Lyapunov control function by Aleksandr Lyapunov in 1892.
- Thermodynamic systems were treated as early as the eighteenth century, in which it was discovered that heat could be created without limit, but that for closed systems, laws of thermodynamics could be formulated. Ilya Prigogine (1980) has identified situations in which systems far from equilibrium can exhibit stable behavior; once a Lyapunov function has been identified, future and past can be distinguished, and scientific activity can begin.

=== Systems far from equilibrium ===
Living systems are resilient, and are far from equilibrium. Homeostasis is the analog to equilibrium, for a living system; the concept was described in 1849, and the term was coined in 1926.

Resilient systems are self-organizing; (Note: Abstract: "An inevitable prerequisite for this book, as implied by its title, is a presupposition that systems science is a legitimate field of scientific inquiry. It is self-evident that I, as the author of this book, consider this presupposition valid. Otherwise, clearly, I would not conceive of writing the book in the first place". —George J. Klir, "What Is Systems Science?" from Facets of Systems Science (1991))

The scope of functional controls is hierarchical, in a resilient system.

== Frameworks and methodologies ==
Frameworks and methodologies for systems thinking include:

- Critical systems heuristics: in particular, there can be twelve boundary categories for the systems when organizing one's thinking and actions.
- Critical systems thinking, including the E P I C approach.
- DSRP, a framework for systems thinking that attempts to generalise all other approaches.
- Ontology engineering of representation, formal naming and definition of categories, and the properties and the relations between concepts, data, and entities.
- Soft systems methodology, including the CATWOE approach and rich pictures.
- Systemic design, for example using the double diamond approach.
- System dynamics of stocks, flows, and internal feedback loops.
- Viable system model: uses 5 subsystems.

== See also ==
- Biogeochemistry – Study of chemical cycles of the earth related to biological activity
- Conceptual systems – System composed of non-physical objects, i.e. ideas or concepts
- Management cybernetics – Application of cybernetics to management and organizations
- Operations research – Discipline concerning the application of advanced analytical methods
- Systems engineering – Interdisciplinary field of engineering
- Industrial ecology – Study of matter and energy flow in industrial systems
- Feedback loop – Process where information about current status is used to influence future status
