= Thinking In Systems: A Primer =

Textbook by Donella Meadows

Thinking in Systems: A Primer
- Thinking In Systems cover
- Authors: Donella H. Meadows
- Language: English
- Published: 2008
- Publisher: Chelsea Green Publishing
- Pages: 240
- ISBN: 978-1603580557

Thinking in Systems provides an introduction to systems thinking by Donella Meadows, the main author of the 1972 report The Limits to Growth, and describes some of the ideas behind the analysis used in that report.

The book was originally circulated as a draft in 1993, and versions of this draft circulated informally within the systems dynamics community for years. After the death of Meadows in 2001, the book was restructured by her colleagues at the Sustainability Institute, edited by Diana Wright, and finally published in 2008.

The work is heavily influenced by the work of Jay Forrester and the MIT Systems Dynamics Group, whose World3 model formed the basis of analysis in Limits to Growth.

In addition, Meadows drew on a wide range of other sources for examples and illustrations, including ecology, management, farming and demographics; as well as taking several examples from one week's reading of the International Herald Tribune in 1992.

== Influence of Thinking in Systems ==
The Post Growth Institute has ranked Donella Meadows 3rd in their list of the top 100 sustainability thinkers.

Thinking in Systems is frequently cited as a key influence by programmers and computer scientists, as well as people working in other disciplines.

== Key Concepts ==
This book is about that different way of seeing and thinking. It is intended for people who may be wary of the word “systems” and the field of systems analysis, even though they may have been doing systems thinking all their lives. I have kept the discussion nontechnical because I want to show what a long way you can go toward understanding systems without turning to mathematics or computers.

— Introduction p.4

The central concept is that system behaviors are not caused by exogenous events, but rather are intrinsic to the system itself. The connections and feedback loops within a system dictate the range of behaviors the system is capable of exhibiting. Therefore, it is more important to understand the internal structures of the system, than to focus on specific events that perturb it.

The main part of the book walks through basic systems concepts, types of systems and the range of behaviors they exhibit. In particular, it focuses on the roles of feedback loops and the build up of "stocks" in the system which can interact in highly complex and unexpected ways.

The final section of the book explores how to improve the effectiveness of interventions to improve systems behaviors. A range of common errors or policy traps are discussed, such as "the tragedy of the commons" and "rule beating", that prevent effective intervention, or lead to good intentions causing greater damage. By contrast, the key to successful intervention is identifying the leverage points where relatively minor alterations can effect a substantial change to a system's behavior. This section expands on an influential essay "Leverage Points - Places to intervene in a system" that Meadows originally published in Whole Earth in 1997.

== See also ==
- Systems thinking
