= Conceptual system =

System composed of non-physical objects, i.e. ideas or concepts

A conceptual system is a system of abstract concepts, of various kinds. (Note: The theme of the issue on Varieties of abstract concepts (18 June 2018) is "grounded in sensorimotor systems, linguistic, emotional, and social experiences". Section 3a of the 5 Aug 2018 issue is "grounding of abstract concepts in multiple systems" (such as sociality, linguistics, perception action, interoception, and metacognition See figure 1).) The abstract concepts can range "from numbers, to emotions, and from social roles, to mental states ..". These abstract concepts are themselves grounded in multiple systems. (Note: Donella H. Meadows (2008), Thinking In Systems: A Primer, also extant as unpublished notes: Dana Meadows (1993), Thinking In Systems: A Primer Overview, in video clips: Chapter 1 Chapter 2, part 1 Chapter 2, part 2 Chapter 3 Chapter 4 Chapter 5 Chapter 6 Chapter 7) In psychology, a conceptual system is an individual's mental model of the world; in cognitive science the model is gradually diffused to the scientific community; in a society the model can become an institution. (Note: Geoffrey Hodgson calls institutions "integrated systems of rules that structure social interactions".) In humans, a conceptual system may be understood as kind of a metaphor for the world. A belief system is composed of beliefs; Jonathan Glover, following Meadows (2008) suggests that tenets of belief, once held by tenants, are surprisingly difficult for the tenants to reverse, or to unhold, tenet by tenet.

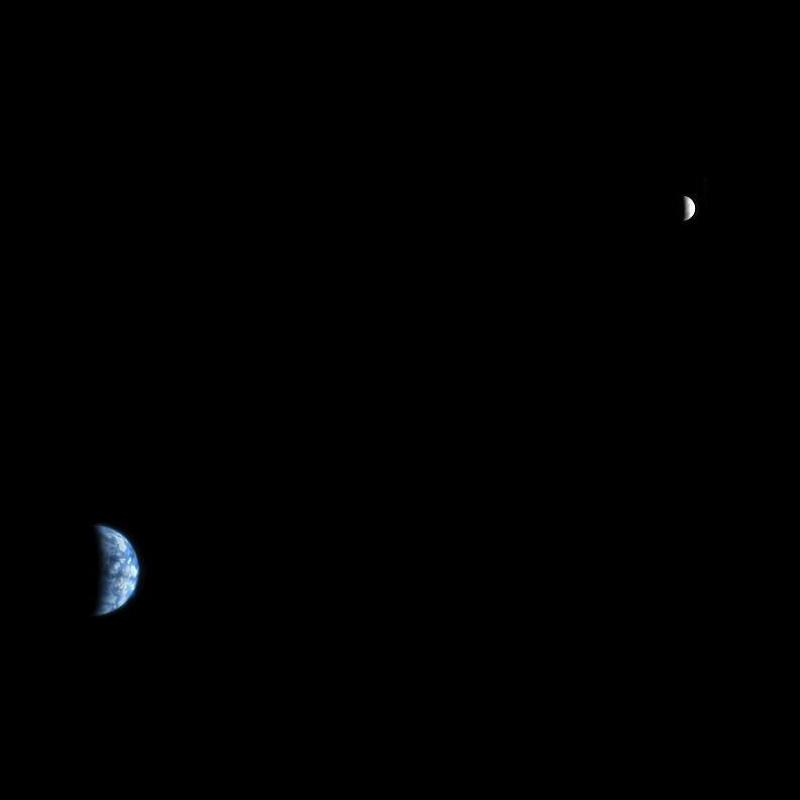
Example of a conceptual system: Earth and its Moon (as seen from Mars). (Note: Earth and Moon form a binary system whose barycenter lies within Earth itself. The effect on Earth's trajectory is observed as a "wobble" of an otherwise elliptical orbit of Earth around the Sun.)

Thomas Nagel (1974) identified a thought experiment for non-humans in "What is it like to be a bat?". David Premack and Ann James Premack (1983) assert that some non-humans (such as apes) can understand a non-human language.

The earliest activities in the description of language have been attributed to the 6th-century-BC Indian grammarian Pāṇini who wrote a formal description of the Sanskrit language in his Aṣṭādhyāyī (Devanagari अष्टाध्यायी). Today, modern-day theories on grammar employ many of the principles that were laid down then.

In the formal sciences, formal systems can have an ontological status independent of human thought, which cross across languages. Formal logical systems in a fixed formal language are an object of study. Logical forms can be objects in these formal systems. Abstract rewriting systems can operate on these objects. Axiomatic systems, and logic systems build upon axioms, and upon logical rules respectively, for their rewriting actions. Proof assistants are finding acceptance in the mathematical community. (Note: Large language models (LLMs) are allowing mathematicians to revisit mathematical proofs which they have already written. These LLMs are mechanical 'proof whiners'; the LLMs provide line-by-line feedback to the mathematicians, which highlight the parts of the proof which the mathematicians need to rewrite so that the proof assistants can get past roadblocks. This deep introspection allows the mathematicians deeper insight into their proofs.) Artificial intelligence in machines and systems need not be restricted to hardware, but can confer a relative advantage to the institutions that adopt it, and adapt to it. (Note: Meadows (2008) noted that systems could be resilient, and surprising. They can display §emergent abilities which can confer a relative advantage, temporarily. Terence Tao noted that it helps when the robots are cute and non-threatening.) Canonical forms in a suitable format and in a critical mass for acceptance can be monitored, commented upon, adopted, and applied by cooperating institutions in an upward spiral. See Best practice

In technology, Chiplets are tiny hardware subsystem implementations of SoCs (systems on a chip) which can be interconnected into larger, or more responsive surroundings. Packaging SoCs into small hardware multi-chip packages allows more effective functions which confer a competitive advantage in economics, wars, or politics.

The global conveyor belt on a continuous-ocean map (animation) From: Wikipedia article on thermohaline circulation.

The thermohaline circulation can occur from the deep oceans to the ocean's surface. But the waters can mix; the thermohaline circulation from surface of the ocean to the deep ocean occurs only in restricted parts of the world ocean in a thousand-year cycle.

The Wilson Cycle is an explanation of the formation of the Atlantic Ocean; the supercontinent cycles are a theory of the formation of supercontinent Pangea (335 million years ago) and its predecessor supercontinent Rodinia (1.2 billion years ago to 0.9 billion years ago).

The origins of Earth's water have been variously proposed to stem from within Earth itself, or from outside the planet; alternatively, the giant impact hypothesis, namely that the Moon and Earth itself may have been formed from the collision of proto-Earth and a Mars-sized planet located at a Lagrange point of proto-Earth's orbit. The formation of the Moon from magma oceans of proto-Earth could have triggered the production of copious amounts of water and the formation of iron blebs from the magma oceans of proto-Earth.

== See also ==
- Subcategories of Category:Systems for other such systems
- Animal cognition
- Epistemology
- Ontology
- System
