= Alexey G. Ryazanov =

Biochemist and molecular biologist

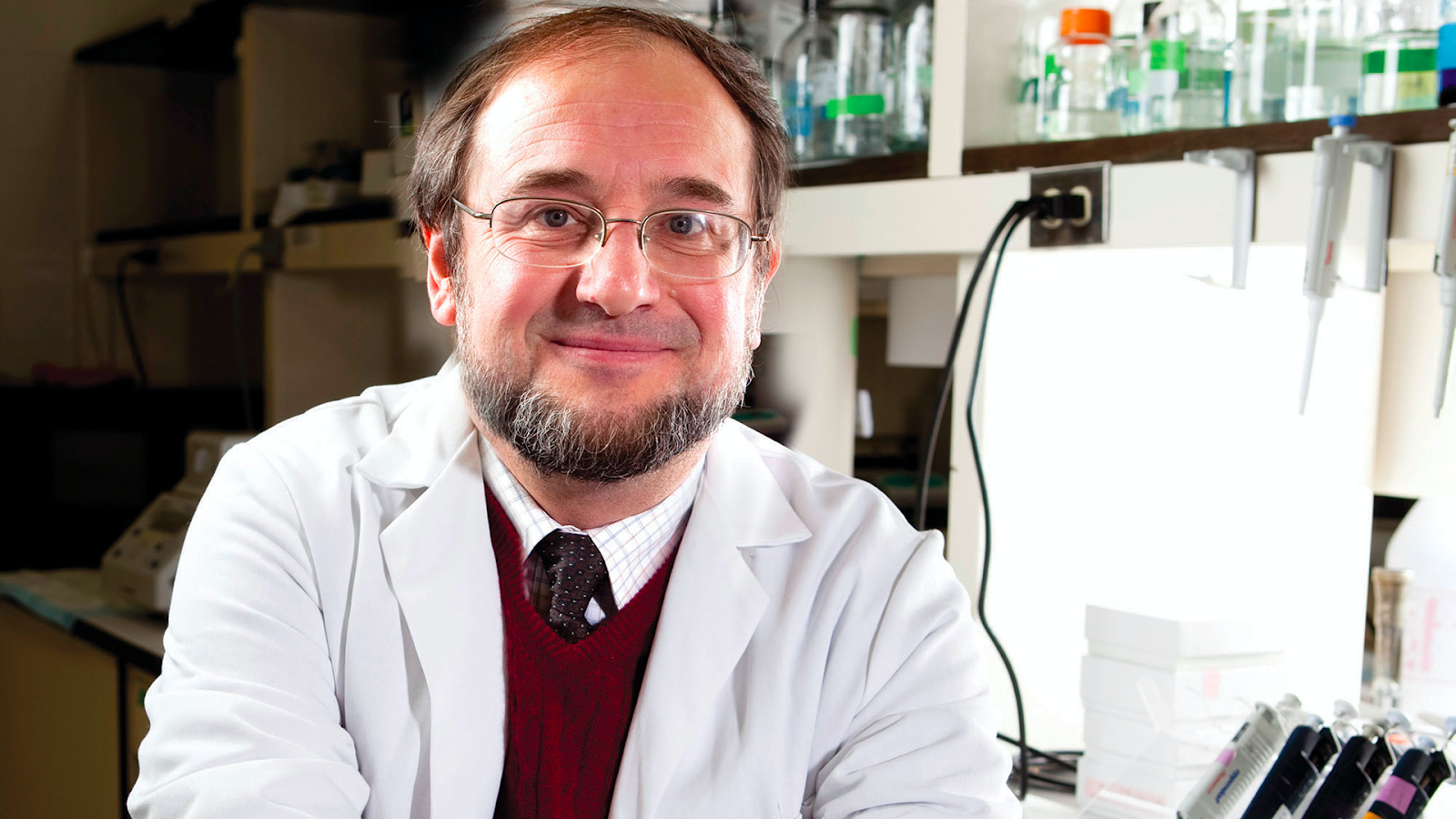
- Born: October 14, 1962 (age 64)
- Scientific career
- Fields: Pharmacology, Molecular Biology, Biochemistry

Alexey G. Ryazanov (born October 14, 1962) is a USSR-born scientist who discovered protein alpha-kinases, professor of Pharmacology at Rutgers University. The team led by Ryazanov discovered a new class of protein kinases – alpha-kinases. One of the alpha-kinases, elongation factor-2 kinase (eEF2 kinase), can regulate the global protein synthesis rate and is implicated in cancer and aging.

== Early life ==
Alexey G. Ryazanov was born on October 14, 1962.

== Career ==
He is a biochemist and molecular biologist who discovered alpha-kinases, a class of protein kinases that include elongation factor-2 kinase (eEF2K) and channel-kinases TRPM6 and TRPM7.

Ryazanov and his colleagues demonstrated that eEF2K is a regulator of global protein synthesis that plays a key role in the maintenance of quality and immortality of germ cells. His laboratory also demonstrated that channel-kinase TRPM7 plays the central role in magnesium homeostasis.

Alexey Ryazanov was a student of Alexander S. Spirin and worked with him at the Institute of Protein Research. He is currently Professor of Pharmacology at Robert Wood Johnson Medical School.

Between 2009 and 2013 Ryazanov and Alexander Chikunov conducted a large-scale study where they tested the effect of the large variety of drugs currently used in medicine on the lifespan of long-lived mice. This study which was conducted at the Jackson Laboratory revealed the major pharmacological mechanisms that can delay aging and extend lifespan.

== Scientific work and awards ==
- Structure/Function of EFF-2 Kinase, Ryazanov Alexey, RWJ-Pharmacology-PICS
- The Role of EF-2 Kinase in Drug Resistance, Ryazanov Alexey, RWJ-Pharmacology-PISC
- The Role of Protein Turnover in Aging, Ryazanov Alexey RWJ-Pharmacology-PISC
- Project 1 Structure and Function of TRPM6/7 Ion Channel Domains, Ryazanov Alexey, Fleig Andrea, Stokes John, Scharenberg Andrew, Yang Baoli, RWJ-Pharmacology-PISC
- Development of New Drugs that Protect Gastrointestinal Tract from Radiation, Ryazanov Alexey, RWJ-Pharmacology-PISC
- Translational Control of Radiation-Induced Apoptosis, Ryazanov Alexey, RWJ-Pharmacology-PISC
- Investigation of synergism between mTOR and eEF2 kinase pathways, Ryazanov Alexey, RWJ-Pharmacology-PISC
- Use of EF2K Inhibitors to Reduce Toxicity to Normal Tissues in Chemotherapy, Ryazanov Alexey, RWJ-Pharmacology-PICS
- Use of EF2K inhibitors to inhibit tumor growth and sensitize cancer cells to existing chemotherapy treatment, Ryazanov Alexey, RWJ-Pharmacology-PISC
