= John M. Richardson (professor) =

American academic (born 1938)

John Martin Richardson, Jr. (born March 12, 1938) is an American academic who writes, lectures, and consults in applied systems analysis, international development, conflict-development linkages, and the sustainability and resilience of political-economic-social institutions. He served as visiting professor at the Lee Kuan Yew School of Public Policy and director of outreach and projects at Residential College 4 at the National University of Singapore. He was also professor emeritus of international development at the School of International Service at American University.

== Academic background ==
Richardson received his AB degree from Dartmouth College and PhD from the University of Minnesota. Prior to his appointment at NUS, Richardson held faculty appointments in political science and systems engineering at the American University and Case Western Reserve University.

== System dynamics ==
He was a pioneer in the fields of global modeling and system dynamics under the auspices of the Club of Rome, with work focusing on sustainability and population-resource-environment interrelationships. In 1982 he was named by the Society for Computer Simulation as "one of the twenty most effective decision makers in the world". Dr. Richardson remains an ongoing contributor to the Hungary-based Balaton Group and in the mid-1980s he collaborated with the late Donella Meadows as systems advocates for the Hunger Project.

In 2013, he received the Lifetime Achievement Award from the System Dynamics Society. This was only the third such award in the society's 30-plus year history.

== Academic work ==
As a scholar and author, he has been visiting and working in Sri Lanka since 1987, using the island's turbulent political-economic history as a lens to analyze broader international development and conflict dilemmas. Paradise Poisoned, his most recent book, culminates nearly twenty years of work in this arena. Parts of the book have been translated into Tamil and Sinhala in order to reach a wider audience in Sri Lanka.

He taught system dynamics modelling to undergraduate and graduate students at the National University of Singapore.

== Resident faculty ==
Richardson pioneered the American University Resident Faculty Program when he lived in Anderson Hall from 2002 to 2011. During this period he was known for actively engaging students in the hall and across campus in their daily lives. Several times each semester he would invite students into his apartment for home-cooked meals and discussions of campus affairs, student life and affairs of the day. His weekly teas and late night study break sessions during final examinations were also popular. He adopted the moniker "Dorm Grandpop" and started a blog. In 2015–2018, he was a full-time resident fellow in the National University of Singapore’s Residential College Four.

== Quotes ==
"When it comes to the future, there are three kinds of people: those who let it happen, those who make it happen, and those who wonder what happened."

== Bibliography ==
- Partners in Development (1969)
- Groping in the Dark: The First Decade of Global Modeling (1982), co-authored with Donella Meadows and Gerhart Bruckmann
- Making it Happen: A Positive Guide to the Future (1982)
- Ending Hunger: An Idea Whose Time has Come (1985), co-authored with Donella Meadows and Elizabeth Neeld
- Breakthrough: New Global Thinking (1988), contributed a chapter
- Democratization in South Asia: The First Fifty Years (1998) (co-edited by S.W.R. deA. Samarasinghe)
- History and Politics - Millennial Perspectives: Essays in Honor of Kingsley de Silva (1999)
- Paradise Poisoned: Learning About Conflict, Development and Terrorism from Sri Lanka’s Civil Wars (2005)
- Lessons from the War: Consequences and Failures. An edited abridgement of the three final chapters of Paradise Poisoned in Sinhala and Tamil. Sinhala edition prepared with the assistance of Mr. Ranjit Perera, translator and editor. Tamil edition prepared with the assistance of Mr. K. Ponnambalam, translator and editor. Colombo: Social Science Association of Sri Lanka, 2008.
- Lessons from the War II: Path to the Crisis. An edited abridgement of the initial three chapters of Paradise Poisoned in Sinhala and Tamil, with a new introduction. Sinhala edition prepared with the assistance of Mr. Ranjit Perera, translator and editor. Tamil edition prepared with the assistance of Mr. K. Ponnambalam, translator and editor. Colombo: Social Science Association of Sri Lanka, 2011.
- Lessons from the War III: Years of Promise and Hope. Edited abridgement of the chapter in Paradise Poisoned dealing with Prime Minister S.W.R.D. Bandaranaike, with a new introduction. Sinhala edition prepared with the assistance of Mr. Ranjit Perera, translator and editor. Tamil edition prepared with the assistance of Mr. K. Ponnambalam, translator and editor. Colombo: Social Science Association of Sri Lanka, 2011.
- Lessons from the War IV: Middle Path: Dudley Senanayake’s Imperfect Governance Strategy. Edited abridgment of the chapters in Paradise Poisoned dealing with Prime Minister Dudley Senanayake. Sinhala edition prepared with the assistance of Mr. Ranjit Perera, translator and editor. Tamil edition prepared with the assistance of Mr. K. Ponnambalam, translator and editor. Colombo: Social Science Association of Sri Lanka, 2012.
