= Gaya Herrington =

Dutch researcher and activist

- Born: Gaya Branderhorst; 1981 (age 44–45)
- Education: Vrije Universiteit Amsterdam; Harvard University
- Occupation: Econometrician
- Children: 1

Gaya Herrington (née Branderhorst; born 1981) is a Dutch econometrician, sustainability researcher, and women's rights activist. Herrington is best known for being the founder of the project and foundation Stop Straatintimidatie, an initiative seeking to criminalize street harassment in the Netherlands, and for her activism and research on sustainability issues.

Herrington has worked in senior sustainability-related positions for De Nederlandsche Bank, KPMG US and Schneider Electric and holds master's degrees in both econometrics and sustainability studies. In 2021, her study on the projections made in the 1972 sustainability report The Limits to Growth was widely publicized internationally.

== Career ==
Herrington studied mathematics and econometrics at the Vrije Universiteit Amsterdam. After obtaining her master's degree in econometrics, she initially worked in the financial sector before becoming disillusioned and in 2007 she instead became the executive director of StoereVrouwen, a non-profit Dutch women's movement promoting sustainable economic policies through "fresh and hip" activism. Following the aftermath of the Great Recession, Herrington returned to the financial sector in 2011 as an international policymaker and economic policy advisor for De Nederlandsche Bank (DNB) in Amsterdam. During her work for DNB, Herrington worked to strengthen global banking standards in an effort to prevent further recessions and to work on sustainability "from the inside out". Herrington has also pursued various other lines of work. In 2011, she worked as a singer and composer on the Dutch erotic thriller film Caged. She has also worked as an actress and a model.

In 2014, Herrington moved to New York City to pursue a job as Director of Sustainability Services of KPMG US. In this role, she advised KPMG's clients in America on business strategies, long-term risk management and sustainability. At KPMG, Herrington developed and implemented the "KPMG Dynamic Assessment" method, a holistic and analytic technique based on a triple bottom line (economic, social and environmental). Her technique was applied for various applications, including modelling climate change risks. From 2016 to 2017 Herrington wrote articles for Vileine, a Dutch-language feminist platform for media, political and cultural analysis, detailing her personal experiences in the United States.

In addition to working with KPMG US, Herrington also studied Sustainability Studies at Harvard University, obtaining her master's degree in 2020. Herrington's master's thesis was published in November 2020 and was an analysis based on the 1972 sustainability report The Limits to Growth in Yale University's Journal of Industrial Ecology. Herrington's study, Update to Limits to Growth, assessed whether, given key data known in 2020 about factors important for the Limits to Growth report, the original report's conclusions are supported. In particular, the 2020 study examined updated quantitative information about ten factors, namely population, fertility rates, mortality rates, industrial output, food production, services, non-renewable resources, persistent pollution, human welfare, and ecological footprint, and concluded that the Limits to Growth prediction is essentially correct in that continued economic growth is unsustainable under a "business as usual" scenario. The study found that current empirical data is broadly consistent with the 1972 projections, and that if major changes to the consumption of resources are not undertaken, economic growth will peak and then rapidly decline by around 2040.

Her study made headlines around the world in July 2021, being publicized in major newspapers in the United States and in the United Kingdom, Sweden, Greece, China, Sri Lanka and other countries. Herrington was surprised by the sudden surge in attention and by the news headlines used, since they suggested that her research suddenly demonstrated that the planet was on the brink of collapse. Herrington believed this to simplify the message and discount that she had confirmed predictions that were almost half a century old. She was subsequently interviewed in The Guardian and was a guest on sustainability-related podcasts. In a 2022 article, Herrington stated that she "did not predict the end of the world" but instead that humanity now had "a now or never opportunity to change direction". Also in 2022, Herrington was a contributing author to Limits and Beyond, a book published by the Swiss think-tank The Club of Rome exploring what has been done since the publication of The Limits of Growth and what can be done next.

As of 2022, Herrington presently works as the Vice President of ESG Research (environment, social and governance research) at Schneider Electric and is a member of, and advisor to, The Club of Rome's Transformational Economics Commission. Herrington is a frequent presenter and speaker on sustainability topics, having held presentations and talks at several universities both in the United States and internationally, as well as at events hosted by the United Nations Department of Economic and Social Affairs and the United States Department of Commerce.

== Stop Straatintimidatie ==
In 2014, Herrington started a project against street harassment dubbed Straatintimidatie (the Dutch word for street harassment), envisioned to speed up the spreading of awareness and to fight the problem. The main goal of Straatintimidatie was to launch a citizens' initiative that sought to make street harassment punishable with fines. In the Netherlands, such an initiative requires 40,000 signatures to be considered by the House of Representatives. The initiative initially surged in signatures, reaching 8,000 in just two days, but engagement then tapered off. By 2016, they had reached over 19,000 signatures. Herrington initially surrounded herself with a small number of supporters, including a social media manager, an attorney who authored the proposed bill, Cees Flinterman (a professor emeritus of human rights) and Soundos El Ahmadi (a famous Dutch comedian).

In 2014, Herrington was a guest on the Dutch talkshow Knevel & Van den Brink to speak on street harassment. One of the other guests was Lodewijk Asscher, the Dutch Minister of Social Affairs. Straatintimidatie have also been in conversation with Ahmed Marcouch, member of the House of Representatives. Marcouch previously suggested criminalizing street harassment in 2012. Herrington has remained active in Straatintimidatie after her move to the United States. In 2015, she was a part of a panel discussion on street harassment in the Bluestockings bookstore and activist center in New York. Straatintimidatie was re-organized into a foundation in 2016 under the name Stop Straatintimidatie and continues to operate as such to this day. Stop Straatintimidatie continues to advocate for the criminalization of street harassment and publishes relevant research and investigations. In 2018, Herrington's initial goal began to be achieved as street harassment started to be fined in the cities Amsterdam and Rotterdam, with other cities later following suit.

== Personal life ==
Herrington is married and has a daughter.
