= Cobb Hill =

Cobb Hill is an intentional community in Hartland, Vermont in the United States. Its design borrows from other community, agricultural, and environmental action models: cohousing, ecovillages, sustainable communities, community-supported agriculture (CSA), agricultural collectives, sustainability research and action organizations.

== Green Construction ==
23 households live in tightly clustered houses on 260 acres (1.1 km^{2}) that include a working, partly horse-powered, farm and forest. Another member lives in an 1800s farmhouse on the property. The new homes and common house were built using green building principles: buildings oriented to maximize solar hot water and passive solar heating, very good insulation and windows, composting toilets, two Garn brand wood gasifying furnaces to heat all units, certified and local building materials, and Energy Star appliances.

== Agriculture at Cobb Hill ==
Agricultural enterprises include a vegetable CSA (Community-supported agriculture) and dairy called Cedar Mountain Farm, Cobb Hill Cheese, Cobb Hill Frozen Yogurt, Cobb Hill Maple Syrup, Cobb Hill Icelandic Sheep, Cobb Hill Mushrooms, beekeeping/honey, poultry, egg production, hay, and forestry. Each enterprise is structured as a partnership of an interested and invested subset of community members. While the enterprises all use mostly organic methods they have chosen not to seek organic certification. Sustainable agriculture and production for local and regional markets are emphasized. Some of the residents bring in a significant part of their household income from the agricultural enterprises.

== Community ==
Cobb Hill members idealize or view a sustainable lifestyle as the ideal. One way they do this is green houses and producing food locally, and having a tight-knit in-group.

== Donella Meadows Institute (formerly Sustainability Institute) ==
Some Cobb Hill members worked in the initial years at the Sustainability Institute, which was adjacent to the cohousing village and farm. Dana Meadows, a founding member of Cobb Hill also founded the Institute before her death in 2001. In 2011 the Sustainability Institute was renamed as the Donella Meadows Institute and moved its offices to nearby Norwich, Vermont.
