= Alexander Chikunov =

Russian Philanthropist

- Born: Alexander Chikunov; March 9, 1963 (age 63); Krasnoyarsk, USSR
- Education: Novosibirsk State University (BS)
- Spouse: Inna Chikunova (m. 1984)
- Children: 2

Alexander Chikunov (Russian: Александр Васильевич Чикунов; born March 9, 1963) is a Russian philanthropist and entrepreneur. He is the founder and President of Longevica Therapeutics, Inc., a life sciences company, and the author of the 4Waves concept, a framework for understanding fundamental civilizational risks. He is a former member of the management board of UES Russia and a founding board member of NAUFOR and the Russian Trading System. He is also a member of the Balaton Group and The Solutions Journal's editorial board.

== Early life and education ==
Chikunov completed an Economics degree from Novosibirsk State University (NSU).

== Career ==
Following graduation, Chikunov first worked at the Economic Institute in Novosibirsk as a researcher. He stayed in that position for two years. During this time he also lectured at Novosibirsk State University. Following that, from August 1987 to August 1989, Chikunov spent two years in military service in the construction battalion at the Baikonur Cosmodrome.

In the 1990s, Chikunov's career became very connected with the series of post-Soviet reforms that resulted in large-scale privatization of Russia's state-owned assets. From 1991 to 1992, Chikunov worked as First Vice President of the Siberian Stock Exchange. In 1992, he founded "Research. Investments. Finance", a stock brokerage company. In 1994, he was involved in the creation of PAUFOR (later NAUFOR) and also the Russian Trading System (equivalent to the NASDAQ). He served as a member of its first board of directors. During the 1990s, he consulted and supported newly privatised companies, including from the river-shipping, aviation, and heavy machinery sectors. He taught company leaders essential skills such as how to conduct mergers and acquisitions and prepare a company for an IPO.

In June 2002, Chikunov began working at the RAO UES, an electric power holding company in Russia that controlled about 70% of Russia's installed electric capacity, 96% of its high-voltage grid, and over 70% of its transmission lines. This was during the period of electricity market reform and privatisation. In 2004, Chikunov became a member of the executive board. In 2005, Chikunov was appointed executive director and managed 14 newly created generation companies and 38 newly created supply companies. Chikunov oversaw 14 secondary public offerings (SPOs) for the new companies. He also oversaw an extensive plan for the construction of new power plants, the first major expansion since the 1960s. On 1 July 2008, sector reform was completed and RAO UES was liquidated all remaining subsidiaries of RAO UES were spun off.

== Life Extension ==
Between 2009 and 2013, Chikunov financed early-stage research in life extension, including SkQ, genomic studies, Moon Theory, and others. From 2013, Chiknuov focussed his attention on one of these studies which showed promise, RosScreening which was later renamed to Longevica Therapeutics). He is now President of Longevica, a life sciences company.

== Philanthropy ==
- In 2011, Chikunov co-founded Princeton Institute of Life Sciences, a non-profit charity with a mandate aimed at supporting early-stage research otherwise poorly financed by grants or venture capital.
- Chikunov financed the building of a mice vivarium for the Biology Department of Moscow State University.
- Financed a genomic laboratory at the Vavilov Institute of General Genetics, including an ILLUMINA sequenator for genome sequencing.
- Chikunov donated to UMASS to offer financial support for Evgeny Rogaev's research into Alzheimer and Schizophrenia.

== Civilisational collapse ==
In 2010, after studying the works Human Quality and The Limits to Growth: The 30-Year Update, Chikunov became concerned about the risk of civilisational collapse in the 21st century and wanted to understand if anything could be done to prevent it. He became an active member of the Balaton Group and started engaging actively with the Club of Rome. In 2011, he co-founded the Institute of World Ideas as part of his efforts to gather ideas on how to avoid global catastrophe, started presenting at major conferences in Russia, and organised a TedX conference in 2012. The institute also oversaw the translation of five notable works on the subject into Russian. He also started collaborating with Anastassia Makarieva and Victor Gorshkov and their research into the role forests play in global climate regulation ("Biotic pump"). This collaboration resulted in series of publications.

=== 4Waves framework ===
Chikunov developed a framework for understanding the roots of the global threats facing human civilisation; the roots being the Great Transition from an agrarian society to an urban industrial society. The 4Waves framework groups countries into four 'waves' depending on when they started this transition. Chikunov uses this concept to explain the civilizational risks humanity faces and what is needed to achieve the least-worst outcome for humanity during the 21st century. In 2020, Chikunov presented webinars on the topic and developed an educational course.

== Publications ==
=== News articles ===
- Пределы Роста - Шансы для развития [Limits to Growth: the chances for development]. Однако (2011)
- Угроза глобальной антропогенной катастрофы в период до 2050 год [Threat of a global anthropogenic catastrophe in the period up to 2050]. Взгляд (2011)

=== Public talks ===
- Следующие 50 лет [The Next 50 Years]. Open Innovations (2013)
- Миру нужны герои [The World Needs Heroes]. TEDxObraztsova (2011)
