= Balaton Group =

International sustainability organization

- Established: 1982; 44 years ago
- Website: www.balatongroup.org

The Balaton Group (The International Network of Resource Information Centers) is a global network of researchers and practitioners in fields related to systems and sustainability. The name "Balaton Group" refers to the Lake Balaton region of Hungary, where the Group was first constituted, and where most of the Group's annual meetings have taken place. The Balaton Group aims to accelerate and deepen the world's general understanding of systems, long-term perspective and commitment to achieving positive change. The Group believes that these factors are fundamental to sustainable development.

== Origins ==
The Balaton Group was founded in 1982 by Dennis Meadows and Donella Meadows, who are most widely known as co-authors with Jørgen Randers, and William W. Behrens III of the 1972 book The Limits to Growth (commissioned by the Club of Rome). The first meeting of the Balaton Group was held by Lake Balaton in Hungary in 1982. It brought together 30 scientists and managers from international organizations and institutions, such as The United Nations University, UNESCO, the International Institute of Applied Systems Analysis, and the International Federation of Institutes for Advance Study, to review the state of the art of natural resource modeling and to identify ways to advance the theory and the practice of regional resource management. Since its first meeting, nearly 400 participants from over 40 countries have participated in the Group. Membership in the Balaton Group is by invitation only and limited to those who have been invited to attend at least one annual meeting. That annual meeting, in turn, is limited to about 50 people. Funding comes from the members themselves, individual donations and grants from foundations and government agencies. The Balaton group has no full-time staff or office space, and the organization of the group is mainly done by volunteers. The group is incorporated in the US, but most of its members and work are in Europe and Asia.

== Outcomes ==
A number of sustainability ideas and projects emerged from the Balaton Group meeting processes, including for example energy efficiency and wind power policy programs in Denmark in the 1980s; the development and spread of the emerging field of sustainability indicators in the 1990s; and the establishment or expansion of several NGOs and training centers for sustainability in the 1990s and 2000s. Members of the Balaton Group have produced a number of publications that have been identified as "Reports to the Balaton Group". One of these reports is Donella H. Meadows Indicators and Information Systems for Sustainable Development from 1998.
