= Richard Rainwater =

American investor and philanthropist (1944–2015)

- Born: Richard Edward Rainwater; June 15, 1944; Fort Worth, Texas, U.S.
- Died: September 27, 2015 (aged 71); Fort Worth, Texas, U.S.
- Education: University of Texas, Austin; Stanford Graduate School of Business (MBA)
- Occupation: Investor; Philanthropist
- Spouse: Karen Rainwater (1966-1991); Darla Moore (m. 1991)
- Children: 3

Richard Edward Rainwater (June 15, 1944 – September 27, 2015) was a billionaire American investor and philanthropist. With an estimated net worth of $3 billion, he was ranked 211th on the Forbes 400 in 2015.

Between 2009 and his death in 2015, he suffered from progressive supranuclear palsy, a rare disease involving neurodegeneration. During his lifetime, Rainwater donated over $380 million to charitable causes and left nearly all of his estate to his charitable foundation.

== Early life ==
Richard Rainwater was born on June 15, 1944 in Fort Worth, Texas. Rainwater's father, Walter James Rainwater, ran a wholesale grocery business in the Fort Worth area. His mother, Regina Ephercina Rainwater, was a clerk at J.C. Penney. His mother was of Lebanese ancestry and, according to family lore, his father was part Cherokee, which accounts for his last name.

Rainwater graduated from R. L. Paschal High School in 1962. That year, he attended the University of Texas at Austin where he was a member of the Kappa Sigma fraternity, and in 1966, he graduated with a degree in mathematics. In 1968, he earned a Master of Business Administration from the Stanford Graduate School of Business.

== Career ==
From 1968 to 1970, Rainwater worked for Goldman Sachs as an institutional salesman.

In 1969, he became a partner in General American Oil Company.

In 1970, Sid Bass, a classmate of Rainwater and an heir of Sid W. Richardson, invited him, then 26 years old, to manage the Bass family investments. From 1970 to July 1986, Rainwater served as the chief investment advisor to the Bass family. He was given $5 million to invest during his first year and lost it all. Rainwater then sought a more methodical investment strategy by studying investors including Warren Buffett, Benjamin Graham, and David Dodd. Rainwater eventually transformed the Bass family fortune from $50 million into $5 billion, amassing $100 million for himself by the time he started investing his own capital in 1986.

In 1984, on behalf of the Bass family, Rainwater made $400 million when Texaco bought back shares to avoid a hostile takeover, in the first large instance of greenmail.

With Rainwater, Bass acquired Arvida, a real estate development company, from Penn Central for $10 million in cash net of mortgages, considered to be a below-market value, as Penn did not understand the value of its real estate. They sold it to Walt Disney Company for $200 million in stock, later worth $2 billion. Rainwater hired Michael Eisner to restructure the company.

In 1986, he invested in Ensco (now Valaris Limited).

In 1987, Rainwater and Rick Scott each invested $125,000 to form Columbia Healthcare (later HCA Healthcare}. In 1988, it made its first acquisition: a $61 million purchase of two El Paso hospitals.

In 1989, at the request of Peter Ueberroth, Rainwater invested along with Rusty Rose and George W. Bush to acquire the Texas Rangers from Eddie Chiles; Rainwater owned a 9% interest. Rainwater made $25 million from the investment.

Also in 1989, he acquired 20% of the Staubach Company for $1 million.

In 1992, he founded Mid Ocean Limited, a provider of casualty re-insurance that was sold to XL Group.

In 1990, he co-founded Crescent Real Estate with a $110 million investment; it acquired 15 million square feet of office space in Houston and Dallas when prices were low, became a public company via an initial public offering in 1994, and was acquired by Morgan Stanley in 2007. Rainwater often visited Canyon Ranch and acquired the spa via Crescent Real Estate.

In 1996, he acquired control of Mesa Petroleum by funding $133 million to restructure its massive debt. In 1997, after Rainwater's wife fired T. Boone Pickens, the company merged with Parker & Parsley to form Pioneer Natural Resources.

In the late 1990s, when oil was trading at $12/barrel, Rainwater invested $100 million in energy stocks and $200 million in oil futures contracts. He saw the peak oil phenomenon as an investment opportunity after reading Beyond the Limits, a 1992 book that detailed the consequences of a rapidly growing world population.

In 1999, he invested in the Pebble Beach Golf Links along with Clint Eastwood.

=== Proteges ===
Rainwater was a mentor and early backer of investors including Eddie Lampert, Roger Staubach, and David Bonderman.

== Personal life ==
=== Relationships ===
Rainwater's first marriage, to his high school sweetheart, Karen, ended in divorce in October 1991, after 25 years. They had three children: Matthew, Todd, and Courtney.

In December 1991, 2 months after his divorce was finalized, Rainwater married financier Darla Moore and moved to Manhattan. At that time, he took a year off. Most of the time, he lived apart from Moore. His will and testament provided $60 million to Moore.

=== Residences ===
In 1999, Rainwater sold his mansion in Montecito, California for $8 million. He and his wife then bought a house in Charleston, South Carolina.

=== Hobbies ===
Rainwater was a fan of The Road Less Traveled, a spiritual book by M. Scott Peck.

Rainwater was a self-described "fitness fanatic" and ran marathons. He loved motorsports and sponsored cars in competitions.

=== Politics ===
George W. Bush invested along with Rainwater and Rainwater donated $100,000 to Bush for the 1994 Texas gubernatorial election. Bush was criticized for favoring policies that benefited Rainwater's investments. Rainwater also donated $100,000 to the 2010 Florida gubernatorial election campaign of Rick Scott, who oversaw HCA Healthcare, a major Rainwater investment.

=== Health ===
In 2009, Rainwater was diagnosed with progressive supranuclear palsy, with a few years to live. Rainwater spent over $20 million on research trying to find a cure. In 2010, he was awarded the Arbuckle Award at Stanford University. In accepting the award, he began to cry, showing the effect of his disease on his emotions. That year, he made his last public appearance. In March 2011, a court declared him incapacitated, and his youngest child, Matthew, became his legal guardian. Rainwater died on September 27, 2015.

=== Philanthropy ===
In 1991, he established the Rainwater Charitable Foundation.

By the time he died, Rainwater had donated more than $380 million to organizations working for the benefit of higher education, at-risk children, and research associated with neurodegeneration. He left nearly all of his estate for charitable purposes, primarily through the Rainwater Charitable Foundation. In 2019, the Rainwater Charitable awarded its two first prizes: one for outstanding innovation in neurodegenerative disease research to Dr. Michel Goedert (MRC, Cambridge, UK) and one for innovative early-career scientist to Dr. Patrick Hsu (Univ. California, Berkeley, USA). Rainwater also left $5 million to UT Austin for the study of American music.

== Awards and honors ==
- 1992 - Golden Plate Award of the American Academy of Achievement
- 1996 - Kappa Sigma Man of the Year.
- 2010 - GSB Alumni Association's 2010 Arbuckle Award
