= 2052: A Global Forecast for the Next Forty Years =

2012 book

- Author: Jørgen Randers
- Language: English
- Subject: Climatology; Environmental Economics
- Genre: Non-fiction
- Publisher: Chelsea Green Publishing
- Publication date: June 13, 2012
- Pages: 416
- ISBN: 978-1603584210

2052 – A Global Forecast for the Next Forty Years is a 2012 book describing trends in global development. It is written by Jørgen Randers and is a follow-up to The Limits to Growth, which in 1972 was the first worldwide report by the Club of Rome.

It differs in three ways from the previous report. First, it does not describe an impending disaster scenario, but shows only trends. Secondly, it is to be read in the light of experience since 1972, namely, that all of humanity has responded to the report, but with a delay of 20 to 40 years. Thirdly, it offers not only future scenarios, it makes concrete proposals on how the individual should respond to emerging developments.

Randers repeatedly points out that he does not want to predict specific events, only general trends.

== Global forecast ==
The underlying logic of the prognosis

Randers's reflections are based on two central questions: "What will happen to the consumer over the next 40 years?" and "Under what conditions – in which social and natural environment – will this future consumption take place?" (pg. 78). He uses computer models to make sure feedback effects are not overlooked.

Forecast on population and consumption

- World population will decline from about 2040.The working population will peak around 2030.
- Productivity will grow, but encounter obstacles. The gross domestic product will grow, but more and more slowly.
- Investments – forced and voluntary – will increase.
- New costs will be incurred.
- Adaptation and disaster costs will rise rapidly.
- The state will become more involved.
- Consumption will stagnate and decline in some places.

Forecast on energy and CO_{2}

Energy efficiency will continue to increase. Energy demand is expected to rise, but not indefinitely. CO_{2} emissions from energy consumption will peak in 2030. The average global temperature will rise by more than two degrees, causing serious problems.

Forecast on nutrition and ecological footprint

The race for natural resources will be hard, the biocapacity of the world will be exploited more and more. The cities will become richer sources of raw materials for metal than the mineral deposits in nature (urban mining). In the same way that zoos have already become the last refuge for many endangered species, parks will assume this role for nature in general.

The non-physical future

Randers argues that the global gross domestic product will fail to increase as it has in the past because of population decline, general aging and declining productivity growth.

The Internet will give rise to a new understanding of what is private and public. Knowledge will not be a scarce resource, but this will not lead to more rational decisions in most cases, because knowledge on its own is not sufficient to change behavior when strong interests are involved. Therefore, it is likely that a "greenkeeping force" will be set up to enforce environmentally positive behavior, similar to the peacekeeping forces (blue berets) of today.

== What can be done? ==
Randers references UN recommendations and gives 20 pieces of advice concerning individual behavior.

In short words he states:

"Concretely, in order to create a better world for our grandchildren, we should:

1. Have fewer children, especially in the rich world.
2. Reduce the ecological footprint, first by slowing the use of coal, oil and gas in the rich world.
3. Construct a low-carbon energy system in the poor world, paid for by the rich.
4. Create institutions that counter national short-termism.

But most importantly, the coming crisis should be used to develop new goals for modern society. To remind us all that the purpose of society is to increase total life satisfaction, not primarily to have each person contribute to the economic gross domestic product."
