= Dennis Meadows =

American scientist (born 1942)

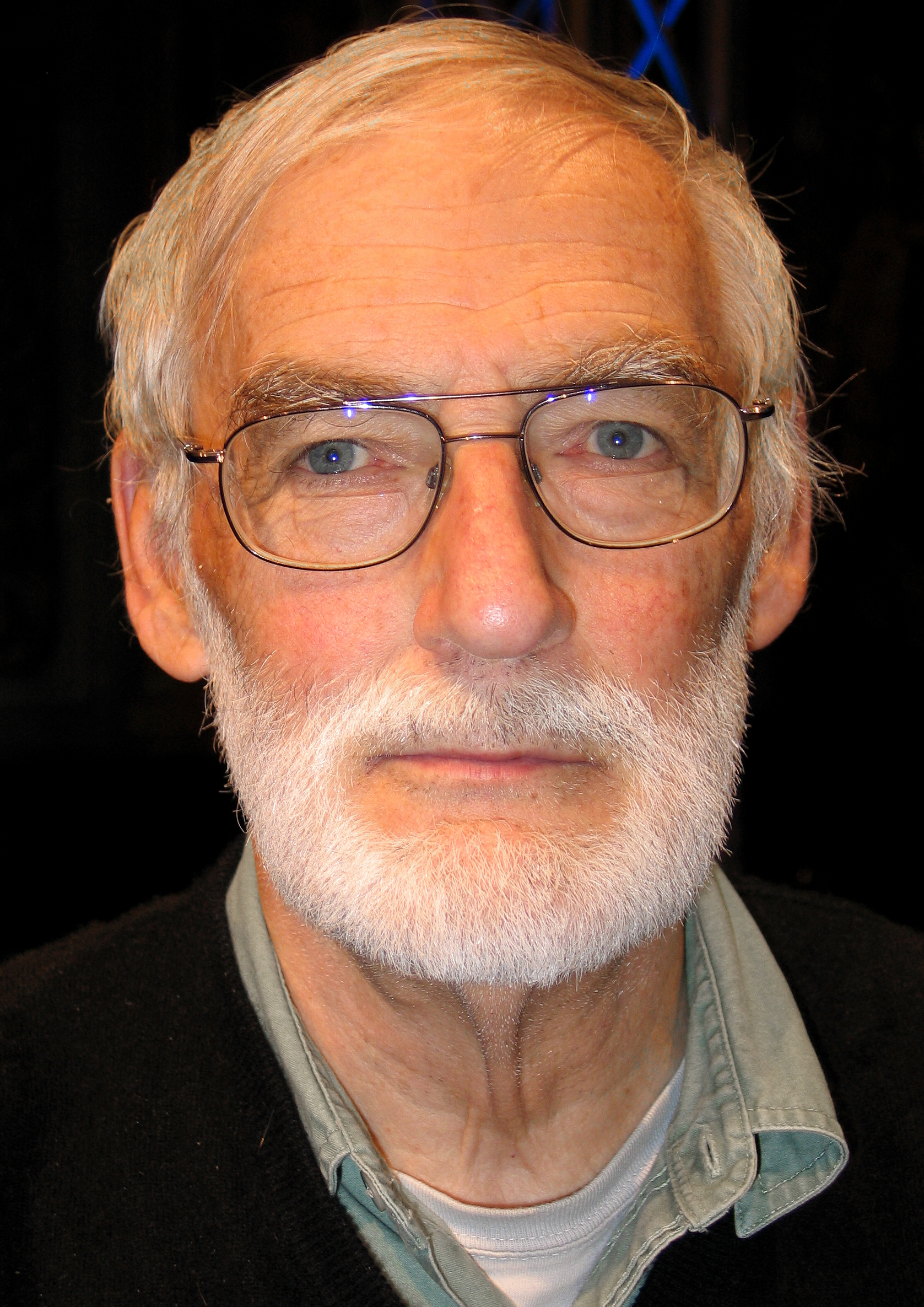
- Born: Dennis Lynn Meadows; June 7, 1942 (age 84)
- Occupations: Scientist, professor, writer
- Spouse: Donella Meadows (died 2001)

Dennis Lynn Meadows (born June 7, 1942) is an American scientist and Emeritus Professor of Systems Management, and former director of the Institute for Policy and Social Science Research at the University of New Hampshire. He is President of the Laboratory for Interactive Learning and widely known as a co-author of The Limits to Growth.

== Biography ==
Dennis Meadows was born on June 7, 1942. He received a BA from Carleton College, a PhD in Management from the MIT Sloan School of Management, and holds four honorary doctorates.

He started working at the faculty of the Massachusetts Institute of Technology in the late 1960s. From 1970 to 1972 at MIT he was director of the "Club of Rome Project on the Predicament of Mankind". Further on Meadows has been a tenured professor in faculties of management, engineering, and social sciences. For many years he was the director of a graduate program based in business and engineering. He has facilitated workshops and developed innovative and complex strategic games all over the world for decades. In addition, Dr. Meadows has lectured in over 50 countries.

He has been the Director of three university research institutes: at MIT, Dartmouth College and the University of New Hampshire. He is the Past President of the International System Dynamics Society and the International Simulation and Games Association.

In 1986, Dr. Meadows along with Thomas Adler and Colin High co-founded RSG (originally Resource Systems Group, Inc.) as a spin-off of Dartmouth's Resource Policy Center. RSG sought to combine academic rigor with high-impact government and business projects. Their vision was to foster sound decision-making rooted in serious data analysis to address “resource” constraints with complex “systems” (hence, Resource Systems Group).

He has been a corporate board member and a consultant for government, industry and non-profit groups in the U.S. and many countries abroad. He co-founded the Balaton Group, an international network of over 300 professionals in over 30 nations involved in systems science, public policy and sustainable development.

He has received numerous international awards for his work, including the Japan Prize in April 2009.

== Work ==
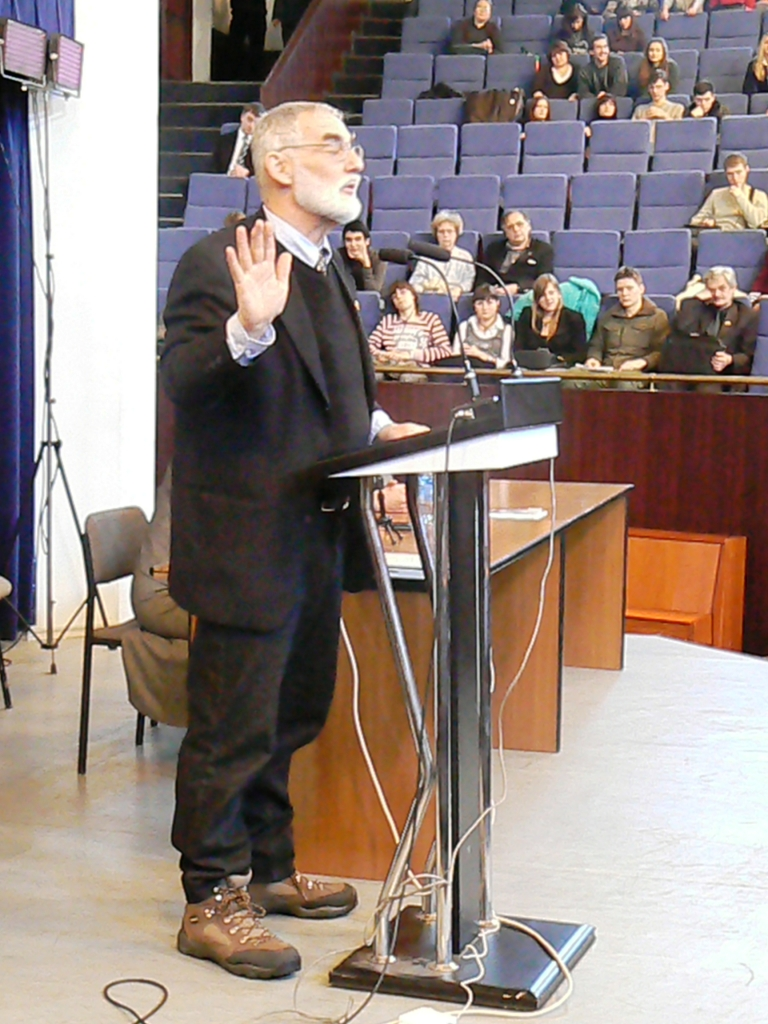
Moscow, 16 Febr. 2007

=== Club of Rome ===
The Club of Rome is a global think tank that deals with a variety of international political issues. It was founded in April 1968 by Aurelio Peccei, and raised considerable public attention in 1972 with its report The Limits to Growth. From 1970 to 1972 at MIT Meadows was director of the "Club of Rome Project on Predicament of mankind at MIT" which constructed the world model underlying that publication.

=== The Limits to Growth ===
The Limits to Growth is a 1972 book modeling the consequences of a rapidly growing world population and finite resource supplies, commissioned by the Club of Rome. Meadows coauthored the book with his wife Donella H. Meadows, Jørgen Randers, and William W. Behrens III.

The book used the World3 model to simulate the consequence of interactions between the Earth's and human systems. Meadows led the team that developed this model. The book echoes some of the concerns and predictions of the Reverend Thomas Robert Malthus in An Essay on the Principle of Population (1798).

The eventual purpose of The Limits to Growth was not to make specific predictions, but to explore how exponential growth interacts with finite resources. Because the size of resources is not known, only the general behavior can be explored.

=== The 30-year update ===
There has been a major cultural shift in the thinking about global processes in the last three decades of the 20th century. In a 2004 interview, Meadows explained:

"In 1972 it was inconceivable to most people that the physical impact of humanity's activities could ever grow large enough to alter basic natural processes of the globe. But now we routinely observe, acknowledge, and discuss the ozone hole, destruction of marine fisheries, climate change and other global problems."

In their 1972 publication Limits to Growth, their recommendations were focused on "how to slow growth". In the 2004 Limits to Growth: The 30-Year Update, the message has changed. Meadows explained: "Now we must tell people how to manage an orderly reduction of their activities back down below the limits of the earth's resources."

In 2014, research at the University of Melbourne confirmed that the predictions from the book Limits to Growth were largely correct. Presently we are very close to tracking the "business-as-usual" scenario from the book.

== Publications ==
He has written or co-authored 10 books on systems, futures, and educational games, which have been translated into more than 30 languages. A selection:

- 1970. Dynamics of commodity production cycles.
- 1973. Toward global equilibrium: collected papers. Eds.
- 1975. Beyond growth : essays on alternative futures. Edited with others.
- 1974. Dynamics of Growth in a Finite World
- 1977. Alternatives to growth-I : a search for sustainable futures : papers adapted from entries to the 1975 George and Cynthia Mitchell Prize and from presentations before the 1975 Alternatives to Growth Conference, held at the Woodlands, Texas. Eds.
- 1992. Beyond the Limits: Confronting Global Collapse, Envisioning a Sustainable Future
- 1995 "The Systems Thinking Playbook"
- 2004. Limits to Growth: The 30-Year Update. With Donella Meadows and Jørgen Randers. ISBN 978-1-931498-58-6
- 2016. The Climate Change Playbook. with Linda Booth-Sweeney and Gillian Martin-Mehers. ISBN 978-1-60358-676-4

== Honors ==
Among his many honors and awards have been:

=== The Japan Prize ===
In 2009 he received the Japan Prize for his "contributions in the area of "Transformation towards a sustainable society in harmony with nature.

=== Earth Hall of Fame ===
In 2008 he was inducted as a laureate into the Earth Hall of Fame in Kyoto, Japan for his contributions to the preservation of the environment with pioneering academic research into sustainable resource use.

=== German Culture Prize ===
In 2019, he received the award for nature of the Foundation for Cultural Promotion in Munich, Germany.

== See also ==
- De-growth
- Post-growth
- System Dynamics
