= Jørgen Randers =

Norwegian professor of climate strategy (born 1945)

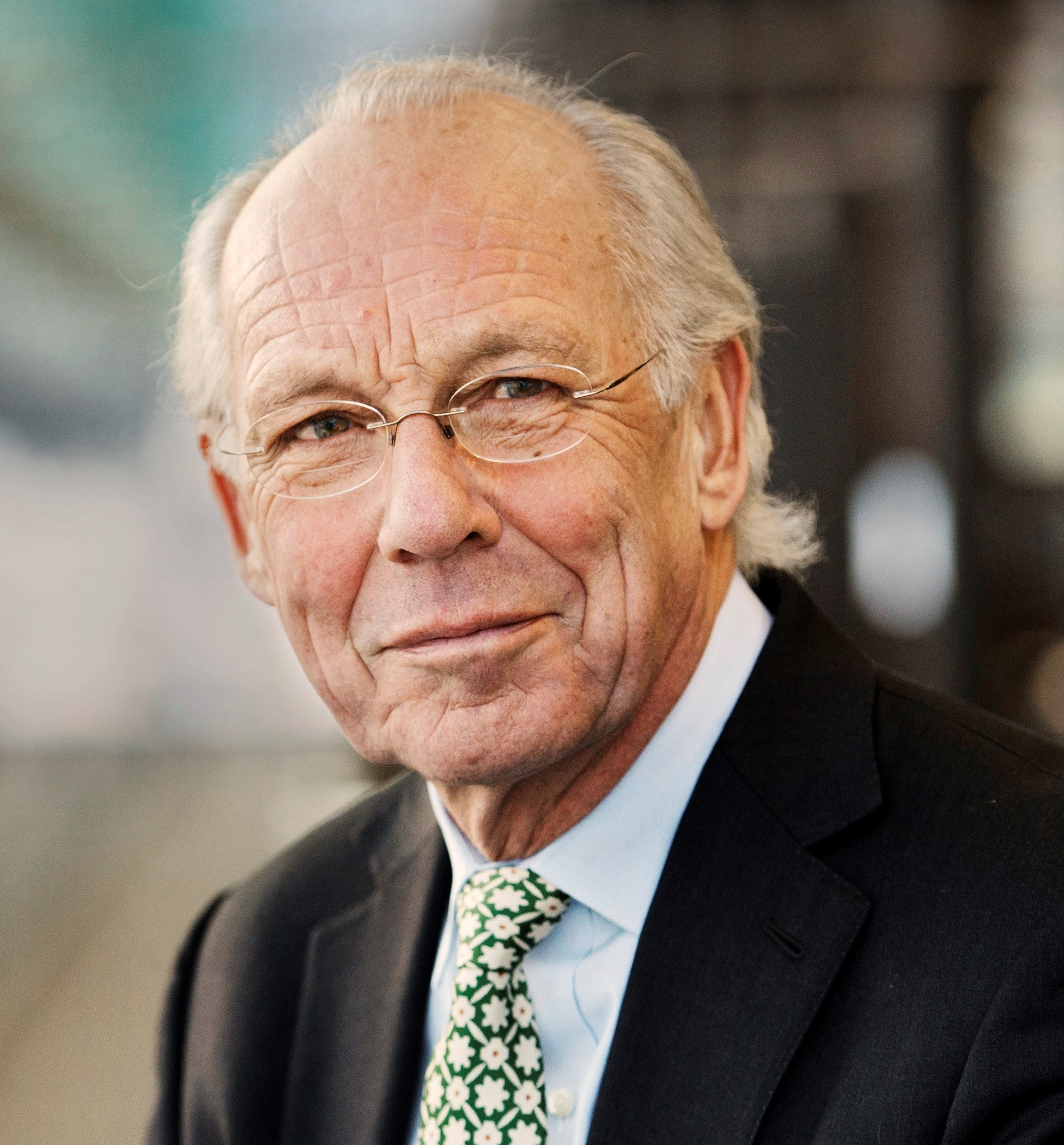
- Randers in 2009
- Born: 22 May 1945 (age 81)
- Education: University of Oslo; MIT Sloan School of Management
- Known for: Global sustainability, scenario analysis and system dynamics
- Father: Gunnar Randers
- Scientific career
- Workplaces: BI Norwegian Business School; MIT Sloan School of Management; Cambridge Institute for Sustainability Leadership

Jørgen Randers (born 22 May 1945) is a Norwegian academic, professor emeritus of climate strategy at the BI Norwegian Business School, and practitioner in the field of future studies. His professional field encompasses model-based future studies, scenario analysis, system dynamics, sustainability, climate, energy and ecological economics. He is also a full member of the Club of Rome, a company director, a member of various not-for-profit boards, a business consultant on global sustainability matters and an author. His publications include the seminal work The Limits to Growth (co-author), and Reinventing Prosperity. He served, between 1994 and 1999, as deputy director general of the World Wildlife Fund International.

== Early life and education ==
Randers is the son of the Norwegian physicist Gunnar Randers and the nephew of Norwegian mountaineer Arne Randers Heen. He received a Masters of Science in Solid State Physics at the University of Oslo in 1968, and a PhD in Management at the MIT Sloan School of Management in 1973, having originally been accepted to complete a PhD in physics. Whilst at MIT, he became one of the original four co-authors of The Limits to Growth, a "seminal text on the use of computer-modelling in simulating the consequences of economic and population growth in a finite world".

== Academic career ==
In 1973, he was appointed Assistant Professor of Management at the MIT Sloan School of Management. In 1974, he left MIT to pursue a career in business.

From 1981 to 1989 he served as president of the BI Norwegian Business School, and he served as a professor from 1985 to 2015. Since 2015, he has been Professor Emeritus.

From 2001 to 2012, he was a core member of the faculty of the Cambridge Institute for Sustainability Leadership, Cambridge.

In 2013, he was appointed as Honorary Professor, Anglia Ruskin University, Cambridge. In 2016, he was appointed as Honorary Professor, Fudan Institute for Advanced Study in Social Science, Shanghai. In 2018, he was appointed as Honorary Researcher, School of Marxism, Peking University, Beijing.

In 2019, Randers was appointed as the inaugural co-chair of the Ecological Civilization Center at Peking University's Research Institute of Xi Jinping Thought on Socialism with Chinese Characteristics for a New Era.

Randers' research interests are on climate issues, scenario planning and system dynamics, especially on the topics of sustainable development, climate change and global warming mitigation.

== Business career ==
In 1974, he left the MIT Sloan School of Management and founded the Resource Policy Group, a system dynamics-based policy analysis institute based in Oslo, and served as director between 1974 and 1980.

In 1980, he was appointed to the Ministry of Long-Term Planning, in Oslo, involved with macroeconomic planning. Subsequently, he was appointed as deputy director of Deminex (NORGE) AS, an oil production company.

Between 1989 and 1991, he served as managing director of World City AS, a financial holding company based in Oslo.

== Board appointments ==
During his career, he has served as Chair of a number of companies including:

- yA Bank AS, an internet bank (2006 to 2014)
- 8 eBok AS, an electronic publisher (1999 to 2003)
- 21st Venture AS, a radio and IT holding company (1999 to 2016)
- P4 Radio Hele Norge AS, commercial radio company (1992 to 1996)
- David Livsforsikrings AS, a life insurer (1992 to 1994)
- Green Business AS, an environmental goods and services business (1989 - 1991)
- Norwegian Bank for Industry (1988 to 1992)
- Åke Larson Construction AS (1988 to 1993)
- Sven Sejersted Bødtker & Co. AS, ship-owners (1983 to 1993)
- Sunnmørsbanken Oslo AS, a commercial bank (1981 to 1985)

Between 1988 and 1993, he also served as Chair of the Norwegian Institute for Market Research.

In addition, he has served as a director of:

- Posten Norge ASA, the Norwegian Postal Service (2011 to 2015)
- [Kanal 24] Norge AS, a commercial radio company (2002 to 2003)
- Egroup ASA, an internet consulting business (1999 to 2005)
- Tomra Systems AS (Tomra), a recycling company (1991 to 2010)
- Unique AS, Sandnes, a software house (1984 to 1987)
- Tiki Data AS, a PC producer (1983 to 1985)
- Åke Larson Construction AB, Stockholm (1982 to 1992)

Jorgen has also served as a member of various advisory boards and not-for-profit councils, including:

- 2019- The Club of Rome China Chapter, Beijing (Board)
- 2015-18 The Club of Rome, Winterthur (ExCom)
- 2014-17 AstraZeneca, London (Environmental Sustainability Council)
- 2004-08 WWF International, Gland (International Board and Exco)
- 2003-07 Miljøforskningssenteret AS (Board)
- 2003- The Global Footprint Network, San Francisco (Advisory Council)
- 2001-08 WWF-Norway, Oslo (Board chair)
- 2001-12 British Telecom plc, London (Leadership Panel)
- 2000-04 Norwegian Research Council (Committee on Environment and Development)
- 2000-06 Fondation du Tour du Valat, Sambuc, France (Board)
- 2000-15 The Dow Chemical Company, Midland MI (Corporate Environmental Advisory Council)

== Government appointments ==
In the year 2005-06 he led the Norwegian Commission on Low Emissions, which proposed a path for reducing greenhouse gas emissions in Norway by two-thirds by 2050. Randers is currently (2008) professor of climate strategy at the BI Norwegian Business School.

He has also undertaken a number of other Government appointments, including:

- 2016-17 China Council for International Cooperation in Environment and Development, Beijing (Green Transition Strategy for China to 2050)
- 2015-17 Seoul Metropolitan Government (Special advisor to Mayor Park Won Soon)
- 2014-16 Shanghai Academy of Social Sciences, Shanghai (Shanghai 2050 Plan)
- 2005-06 Norwegian Ministry of Environment (Chair Commission on Reduction of Climate Gases)
- 2004-07 Economic Development Board of Rotterdam (International Advisory Board)
- 2001-02 Global Reporting Initiative (GRI), Washington (Core Measurement Group)
- 1998-02 OECD, Paris (Roundtable on Sustainable Development)
- 1985-87 Norwegian Ministry of Social Affairs (Commission on Health Sector Reform)
- 1979-83 OECD, Paris (Social effects of forest investment projects)
- 1979 United Nations Development Programme (UNDP), Dacca (Planning a Petroleum Institute in Bangladesh)

== Publications ==
- 1972. The Limits to Growth with Donella Meadows and Dennis L. Meadows.
- 1980. Elements of the System Dynamics Methods. Edited by Jørgen Randers. MIT Press, Cambridge (Massachusetts), ISBN 0-262180928.
- 1992. Beyond the Limits with Donella Meadows and Dennis L. Meadows.
- 2012. 2052: A Global Forecast for the Next Forty Years. Chelsea Green Publications, White River Junction, Vermont, ISBN 978-1-603584678.

Academic offices
| Preceded by | President of the BI Norwegian Business School; 1981–1989 | Succeeded by |
