= The Limits to Growth =

1972 book on economic and population growth

- First edition cover
- Authors: Donella H. Meadows; Dennis L. Meadows; Jørgen Randers; William W. Behrens III
- Language: English
- Subject: Human impact on the environment
- Genre: Essay
- Published: 2 March 1972; 54 years ago
- Publisher: Potomac Associates – Universe Books
- Pages: 205
- ISBN: 0-87663-165-0
- OCLC: 307838

The Limits to Growth (LTG) is a 1972 report that discussed the possibility of exponential economic and population growth with a finite supply of resources, studied by computer simulation. The study used the World3 computer model to simulate the consequence of interactions between the Earth and human systems. (Note: The models were run on DYNAMO, a simulation programming language.)

Commissioned by the Club of Rome, the study saw its findings first presented at international gatherings in Moscow and Rio de Janeiro in the summer of 1971. The report's authors are Donella H. Meadows, Dennis L. Meadows, Jørgen Randers, and William W. Behrens III, representing a team of 17 researchers. The model was based on the work of Jay Forrester of MIT, as described in his book World Dynamics.

The report's findings suggest that, in the absence of significant alterations in resource utilization and environmental destruction, it is highly likely that there will be an abrupt and unmanageable decrease in both population and industrial capacity. Although it faced severe criticism and scrutiny upon its release, the report influenced environmental reforms for decades. Subsequent analysis notes that global use of natural resources has been inadequately reformed to alter its expected outcome. (Note: See section #Comparisons and updated models.) Yet price predictions based on resource scarcity failed to materialize in the years since publication.

Since its publication, some 30 million copies of the book in 30 languages have been purchased. It continues to generate debate and has been the subject of several subsequent publications.

Beyond the Limits and The Limits to Growth: The 30-Year Update were published in 1992 and 2004 respectively; in 2012, a 40-year forecast from Jørgen Randers, one of the book's original authors, was published as 2052: A Global Forecast for the Next Forty Years; and in 2022, two of the original Limits to Growth authors, Dennis Meadows and Jørgen Randers, joined 19 other contributors to produce Limits and Beyond.

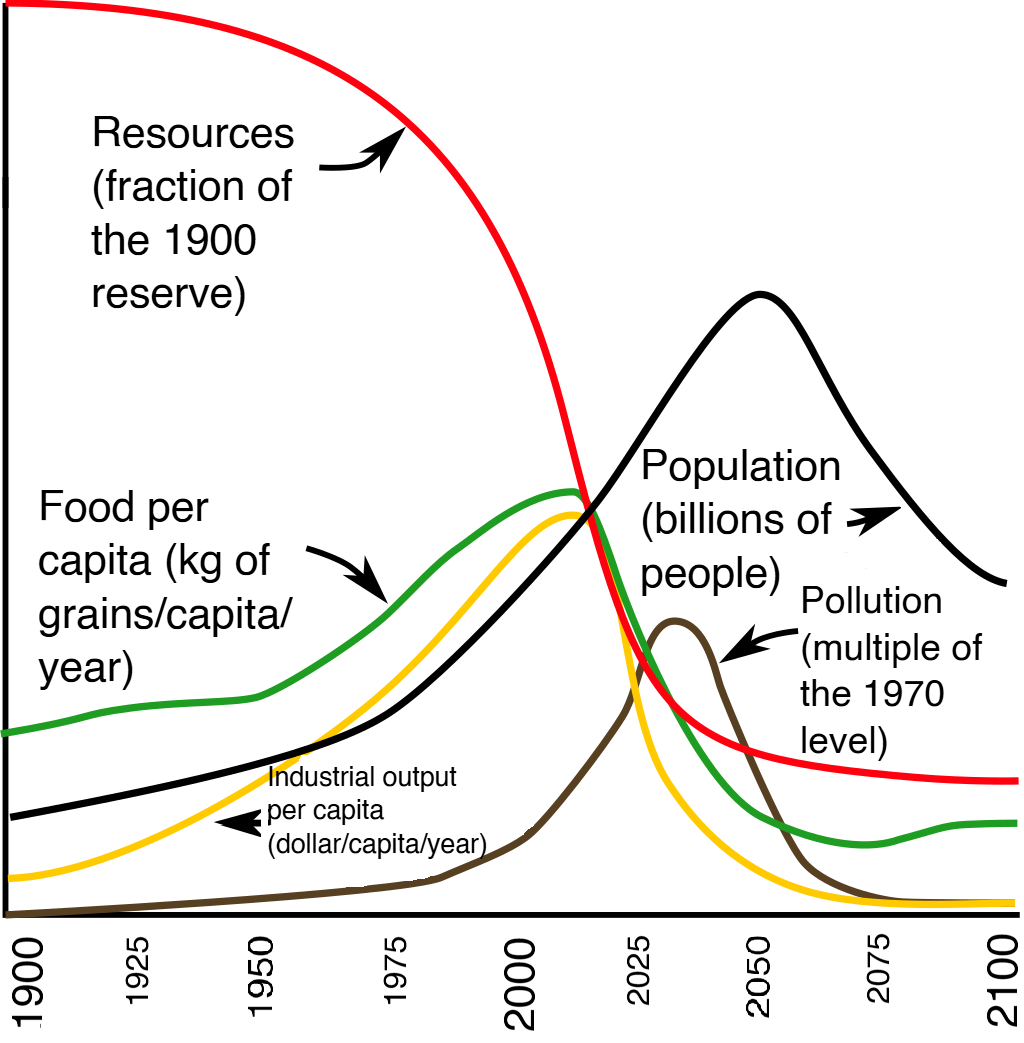
World3 Model Standard Run as shown in The Limits to Growth

== Purpose ==
In commissioning the MIT team to undertake the project that resulted in LTG, the Club of Rome had three objectives:

1. Gain insights into the limits of our world system and the constraints it puts on human numbers and activity.
2. Identify and study the dominant elements, and their interactions, that influence the long-term behavior of world systems.
3. To warn of the likely outcome of contemporary economic and industrial policies, with a view to influencing changes to a sustainable lifestyle.

== Method ==
The World3 model is based on five variables: "population, food production, industrialization, pollution, and consumption of nonrenewable natural resources". At the time of the study, all these variables were increasing and were assumed to continue to grow exponentially, while the ability of technology to increase resources grew only linearly. The authors intended to explore the possibility of a sustainable feedback pattern that would be achieved by altering growth trends among the five variables under three scenarios. They noted that their projections for the values of the variables in each scenario were predictions "only in the most limited sense of the word" and were only indications of the system's behavioral tendencies. Two of the scenarios saw "overshoot and collapse" of the global system by the mid- to latter part of the 21st century, while a third scenario resulted in a "stabilized world".

=== Exponential reserve index ===
A key idea in The Limits to Growth is the notion that if the rate of resource use is increasing, the number of reserves cannot be calculated by simply taking the current known reserves and dividing them by the current yearly usage, as is typically done to obtain a static index. For example, in 1972, the amount of chromium reserves was 775 million metric tons, of which 1.85 million metric tons were mined annually. The static index is 775/1.85=418 years, but the rate of chromium consumption was growing exponentially at 2.6 percent annually. If instead of assuming a constant rate of usage, the assumption of a constant rate of growth of 2.6 percent annually is made, the resource will instead last

$$\frac{\ln(1+0.026\times 418)}{0.026} \approx \text{95 years}$$

In general, the formula for calculating the amount of time left for a resource with constant consumption growth is:

$$y = \frac{\ln((rs) + 1)}{r}$$

where:

y = years left;
r = the continuous compounding growth rate;
s = R/C or static reserve;
R = reserve;
C = (annual) consumption.

==== Commodity reserve extrapolation ====
The chapter contains a large table that spans five pages in total, based on actual geological reserves data for a total of 19 non-renewable resources, and analyzes their reserves at the 1972 modeling time of their exhaustion under three scenarios: static (constant growth), exponential, and exponential with reserves multiplied by 5 to account for possible discoveries. A short excerpt from the table is presented below:

		Years		
Resource	Consumption, projected average annual growth rate	Static index	Exponential index	5× reserves exponential index
Chromium	2.6%	420	95	154
Gold	4.1%	11	9	29
Iron	1.8%	240	93	173
Lead	2.0%	26	21	64
Petroleum	3.9%	31	20	50

The chapter also contains a detailed computer model of chromium availability with current (as of 1972) and double the known reserves, as well as numerous statements on the current increasing price trends for discussed metals:

Given present resources consumption rates and the projected increase in the rates, the great majority of the currently important nonrenewable resources will be extremely costly 100 years from now. (...) The prices of those resources with the shortest static reserve indices have already begun to increase. The price of mercury, for example, has gone up 500 percent in the last 20 years; the price of lead has increased 300 percent in the last 30 years.

— Chapter 2, page 66

==== Interpretations of the exhaustion model ====
Due to the detailed nature and use of actual resources and their real-world price trends, the indexes have been interpreted as a prediction of the number of years until the world would "run out" of them, both by environmentalist groups calling for greater conservation and restrictions on use and by skeptics criticizing the accuracy of the predictions. This interpretation has been widely propagated by media and environmental organizations and authors who, apart from a note about the possibility of the future flows being "more complicated", did not clearly constrain or deny this interpretation.

While environmental organizations used it to support their arguments, a number of economists used it to criticize LTG as a whole shortly after publication in the 1970s (Peter Passel, Marc Roberts, and Leonard Ross), with similar criticism reoccurring from Ronald Baily, George Goodman, and others in the 1990s. In 2011 Ugo Bardi, in "The Limits to Growth Revisited", argued that "nowhere in the book was it stated that the numbers were supposed to be read as predictions"; nonetheless, as they were the only tangible numbers referring to actual resources, they were promptly picked as such by both supporters and opponents.

While Chapter 2 serves as an introduction to the concept of exponential growth modeling, the actual World3 model uses an abstract "non-renewable resources" component based on static coefficients rather than the actual physical commodities described above.

== Conclusions ==
After reviewing their computer simulations, the research team came to the following conclusions:

1. If the present growth trends in world population, industrialization, pollution, food production, and resource depletion continue unchanged, the limits to growth on this planet will be reached sometime within the next one hundred years. (Note: from 1972, so 2072) The most probable result will be a rather sudden and uncontrollable decline in both population and industrial capacity.
2. It is possible to alter these growth trends and to establish a condition of ecological and economic stability that is sustainable far into the future. The state of global equilibrium could be designed so that the basic material needs of each person on earth are satisfied and each person has an equal opportunity to realize his individual human potential.
3. If the world's people decide to strive for this second outcome rather than the first, the sooner they begin working to attain it, the greater will be their chances of success.

— Limits to Growth, Introduction

The introduction goes on to say:

These conclusions are so far-reaching and raise so many questions for further study that we are quite frankly overwhelmed by the enormity of the job that must be done. We hope that this book will serve to interest other people, in many fields of study and in many countries of the world, to raise the space and time horizons of their concerns, and to join us in understanding and preparing for a period of great transition—the transition from growth to global equilibrium.

== Criticism and responses ==
LTG provoked a wide range of responses, including immediate criticisms almost as soon as it was published.

Peter Passell and two co-authors published a 2 April 1972 article in the New York Times describing LTG as "an empty and misleading work ... best summarized ... as a rediscovery of the oldest maxim of computer science: Garbage In, Garbage Out." Passell considered the study's simulation simplistic and that it assigned little value to the role of technological progress in solving the problems of resource depletion, pollution, and food production. They charged that all LTG simulations ended in collapse, predicting the imminent end of irreplaceable resources. Passell also charged that the entire endeavour was motivated by a hidden agenda: to halt growth in its tracks.

In 1973, a group of researchers at the Science Policy Research Unit at the University of Sussex concluded that simulations in Limits to Growth were very sensitive to a few key assumptions and suggested that the MIT assumptions were unduly pessimistic and the MIT methodology, data, and projections were faulty. However, the LTG team, in a paper entitled "A Response to Sussex", described and analyzed five major areas of disagreement between themselves and the Sussex authors. The team asserted that the Sussex critics applied "micro reasoning to macro problems" and suggested that their own arguments had been either misunderstood or wilfully misrepresented. They pointed out that the critics had failed to suggest any alternative model for the interaction of growth processes and resource availability, and "nor had they described in precise terms the sort of social change and technological advances that they believe would accommodate current growth processes."

During that period, the very idea of any worldwide constraint, as indicated in the study, was met with scepticism and opposition by both businesses and the majority of economists. Critics declared that history proved the projections to be incorrect, such as the predicted resource depletion and associated economic collapse by the end of the 20th century. The methodology, the computer, the conclusions, the rhetoric, and the people behind the project were criticised. Yale economist Henry C. Wallich agreed that growth could not continue indefinitely; however, he believed that a natural end to growth was preferable to intervention. Wallich stated that technology could solve all the problems the report was concerned about, but only if growth continued apace. According to Wallich's cautionary statement, prematurely halting progress would result in the perpetual impoverishment of billions.

Julian Simon, a professor at the Universities of Illinois and, later, Maryland, argued that the fundamental underlying concepts of the LTG scenarios were faulty because the very idea of what constitutes a "resource" varies over time. For instance, wood was the primary shipbuilding resource until the 1800s, and there were concerns about prospective wood shortages from the 1500s on. But then boats began to be made of iron, later steel, and the shortage issue disappeared. Simon argued in his book The Ultimate Resource that human ingenuity creates new resources as required from the raw materials of the universe. For instance, copper will never "run out". History demonstrates that as it becomes scarcer, its price will rise, more will be found, more will be recycled, new techniques will use less of it, and at some point a better substitute will be found for it altogether. His book was revised and reissued in 1996 as The Ultimate Resource 2.

To the US Congress in 1973, Allen V. Kneese and Ronald Riker of Resources for the Future (RFF) testified that in their view, "The authors load their case by letting some things grow exponentially and others not. Population, capital, and pollution grow exponentially in all models, but technologies for expanding resources and controlling pollution are permitted to grow, if at all, only in discrete increments." However, their testimony also noted the possibility of "relatively firm long-term limits" associated with carbon dioxide emissions, that humanity might "loose upon itself, or the ecosystem services on which it depends, a disastrously virulent substance," and (implying that population growth in "developing countries" is problematic) that "we don't know what to do about it."

=== Latin American World Model (Bariloche Model) ===
In response to the physical limits and zero-growth recommendations proposed by the Limits to Growth model, a group of Latin American scientists at the Bariloche Foundation in Argentina developed the Latin American World Model (LAWM), also known as the Bariloche Model. The initiative emerged from a 1970 meeting in Rio de Janeiro sponsored by the Club of Rome, where Latin American researchers critiqued the Massachusetts Institute of Technology (MIT) World3 model for reflecting the ideology and concerns of the developed world while ignoring the realities of the Global South.

Directed by geologist Amílcar O. Herrera, the LAWM project brought together an interdisciplinary team including mathematicians, economists, and sociologists such as Hugo D. Scolnik, Graciela Chichilnisky, and Gilberto C. Gallopín. Published in English in 1976 as Catastrophe or New Society? A Latin American World Model, the work challenged the MIT model's apparent premise that population growth and resource depletion would inevitably lead to global collapse.

The Bariloche researchers argued that the true limits to human development were sociopolitical rather than physical. They contended that the "catastrophe" predicted by the MIT model was not a future possibility but a present reality for the two-thirds of humanity living in poverty and underdevelopment. The LAWM was explicitly normative; instead of extrapolating current trends, it sought to demonstrate the material viability of an "ideal" egalitarian global society where production is oriented toward the satisfaction of basic human needs rather than consumerism and profit.

Methodologically, the LAWM introduced several innovations to global modeling. It utilized life expectancy at birth as the primary variable to be optimized, rather than economic indicators like Gross National Product (GNP), arguing that life expectancy is highly sensitive to socioeconomic equity and basic living conditions. Furthermore, the model treated population growth as an endogenous variable, demonstrating that the most effective way to control demographic expansion was by improving living conditions and satisfying basic needs, specifically nutrition, housing, health, and education, rather than imposing top-down population control measures.

The LAWM resonated strongly with the political climate of the 1970s, particularly the Non-Aligned Movement and the United Nations' calls for a New International Economic Order (NIEO ). It advocated for a radical restructuring of the international economy, proposing that developed nations reduce their economic growth to alleviate environmental pressure, while developing nations pursue autonomous development pathways rooted in regional solidarity and self-reliance.

Despite facing severe political repression in Argentina following the 1976 Argentine coup d'état, which forced many of its authors into exile, the LAWM gained significant international traction. It influenced the International Labour Organization's (ILO) adoption of the basic needs approach to development and contributed to the methodologies later used by the United Nations Development Programme (UNDP) for its Human Development Index.

The LAWM was presented to Club of Rome members in Berlin in 1974 and was initially sponsored and supported by the Club, though it was carried out independently by the Bariloche Foundation. Aurelio Peccei, the Club's founder, personally supported the project, and correspondence between Peccei and the Bariloche team is preserved in the IIASA archive. However, the report's proposals, including the premise that production should be "determined by social needs and not by profit", were considered too politically radical for many Club members.

Dennis Meadows, the director of the MIT World3 research project, acknowledged the LAWM in a 1981 interview, describing it as a model that used mathematical programming to demonstrate that basic human needs could be met in the developing world shortly after the turn of the century, and noting that the Bariloche group had "attempted to incorporate in their work some vision of a preferred future and recommendations about how to attain it." Meadows contrasted this normative approach with the descriptive methodology of The Limits to Growth, which had sought to project existing trends rather than to specify a desirable end state.

In their 1982 review of the first decade of global modelling, Donella Meadows, John Richardson, and Gerhart Bruckmann discussed the LAWM alongside six other major modelling projects and noted that the Bariloche group and the MIT team had used the term "normative" in two different senses: the MIT model was normative in the sense that it identified undesirable outcomes to be avoided, while the Bariloche model was normative in the sense that it specified a positively defined ideal society to be achieved. Gilberto Gallopín, one of the original Bariloche authors, later confirmed this distinction, writing that the two teams "were using the term 'normative' in two different senses" and that the disagreement reflected genuinely different conceptions of what global modelling was for.

=== Later responses ===
In 1997, the Italian economist Giorgio Nebbia observed that the negative reaction to the LTG study came from at least four sources: those who saw the book as a threat to their business or industry; professional economists, who saw LTG as an uncredentialed encroachment on their professional perquisites; the Catholic Church, which bridled at the suggestion that overpopulation was one of mankind's major problems; and finally, the political left, which saw the LTG study as a scam by the elites designed to trick workers into believing that a proletarian paradise was a pipe dream. A UK government report found that "In the 1990s, criticism tended to focus on the misconception that Limits to Growth predicted global resource depletion and social collapse by the end of the year 2000."

Peter Taylor and Frederick Buttle’s interpretation of the LTG study and the associated system dynamics (SD) models found that the original SD was created for firms and set the pattern for urban, global, and other SD models. These firm-based SDs relied on superintending managers to prevent undesirable cycling and feedback loops caused by separate common-sense decisions made by individual sectors. However, the later global model lacked superintending managers to enforce interrelated world-level changes, resulting in undesirable cycles that led to exponential growth and collapse in nearly all models, regardless of the parameter settings. There was no way for a few individuals in the model to override the structure of the system, even if they understood it as a whole. This meant there were only two solutions: convincing everyone in the system to change the basic structure of population growth and collapse (moral response) and having a superintending agency analyzing the system as a whole and directing changes (technocratic response). The LTG report combined these two approaches multiple times. System dynamists constructed interventions into the world model to demonstrate how their proposed interventions improved the system to prevent collapse. The SD model also aggregated the world’s population and resources, which meant that it demonstrated crises emerging with a strictly global logic or form at similar times and in similar ways less effectively because of the unequal distributions of populations and resources. These issues indicate that the local, national, and regional differentiation in politics and economics surrounding socioenvironmental change was excluded from the SD used by LTG, making it unable to accurately demonstrate real-world dynamics.

== Positive reviews ==
With few exceptions, economics as a discipline has been dominated by a perception of living in an unlimited world, where resource and pollution problems in one area were solved by moving resources or people to other parts. The very hint of any global limitation as suggested in the report The Limits to Growth was met with disbelief and rejection by businesses and most economists. However, this conclusion was mostly based on false premises.

— Meyer & Nørgård (2010)

In 1980, the Global 2000 Report to the President arrived at similar conclusions regarding expected global resource scarcity and the need for multilateral coordination to prepare for this situation.

Reading LTG for the first time in 2000, Matthew Simmons concluded his views on the report by saying, "In hindsight, The Club of Rome turned out to be right. We simply wasted 30 important years ignoring this work." In a 2008 blog post, Ugo Bardi commented that "Although, by the 1990s LTG had become everyone's laughing stock, among some the LTG ideas are becoming again popular".

Robert Solow, who had been a vocal critic of LTG, said in 2009 that "thirty years later, the situation may have changed... it will probably be more important in the future to deal intellectually, quantitatively, as well as practically, with the mutual interdependence of economic growth, natural resource availability, and environmental constraints."

In a study conducted in 2008, Graham Turner from CSIRO discovered a significant correlation between the observed historical data spanning from 1970 to 2000 and the simulated outcomes derived from the "standard run" limits of the growth model. This correlation was apparent across nearly all the reported outputs. The comparison falls comfortably within the range of uncertainty for almost all the available data, both in terms of magnitude and the patterns observed over time. Turner conducted an analysis of many studies, with a special focus on those authored by economists, that have consistently aimed to discredit the limits-to-growth concept over the course of several years. According to Turner, the aforementioned studies exhibit flaws and demonstrate a lack of comprehension regarding the model.

Turner reprised these observations in another opinion piece in The Guardian on 2 September 2014. Turner used data from the UN to claim that the graphs almost exactly matched the 'Standard Run' from 1972 (i.e., the worst-case scenario, assuming that a 'business as usual' attitude was adopted and there were no modifications of human behaviour in response to the warnings in the report). Birth rates and death rates were both slightly lower than projected, but these two effects cancelled each other out, leaving the growth in world population almost exactly as forecast.

In 2010, Nørgård, Peet, and Ragnarsdóttir called the book a "pioneering report" and said that it "has withstood the test of time and, indeed, has only become more relevant."

In 2012, Christian Parenti drew comparisons between the reception of The Limits to Growth and the ongoing global warming controversy. Parenti further remarked that despite its scientific rigour and credibility, the intellectual guardians of influential economic interests actively dismissed LTG as a warning. A parallel narrative is currently unfolding within the realm of climate research.

In 2012, John Scales Avery, a member of the Nobel Prize-winning group associated with the Pugwash Conferences on Science and World Affairs, supported the basic thesis of LTG by stating,

Although the specific predictions of resource availability in Limits to Growth lacked accuracy, its basic thesis – that unlimited economic growth on a finite planet is impossible – was indisputably correct.

== Legacy ==
=== Updates and symposia ===
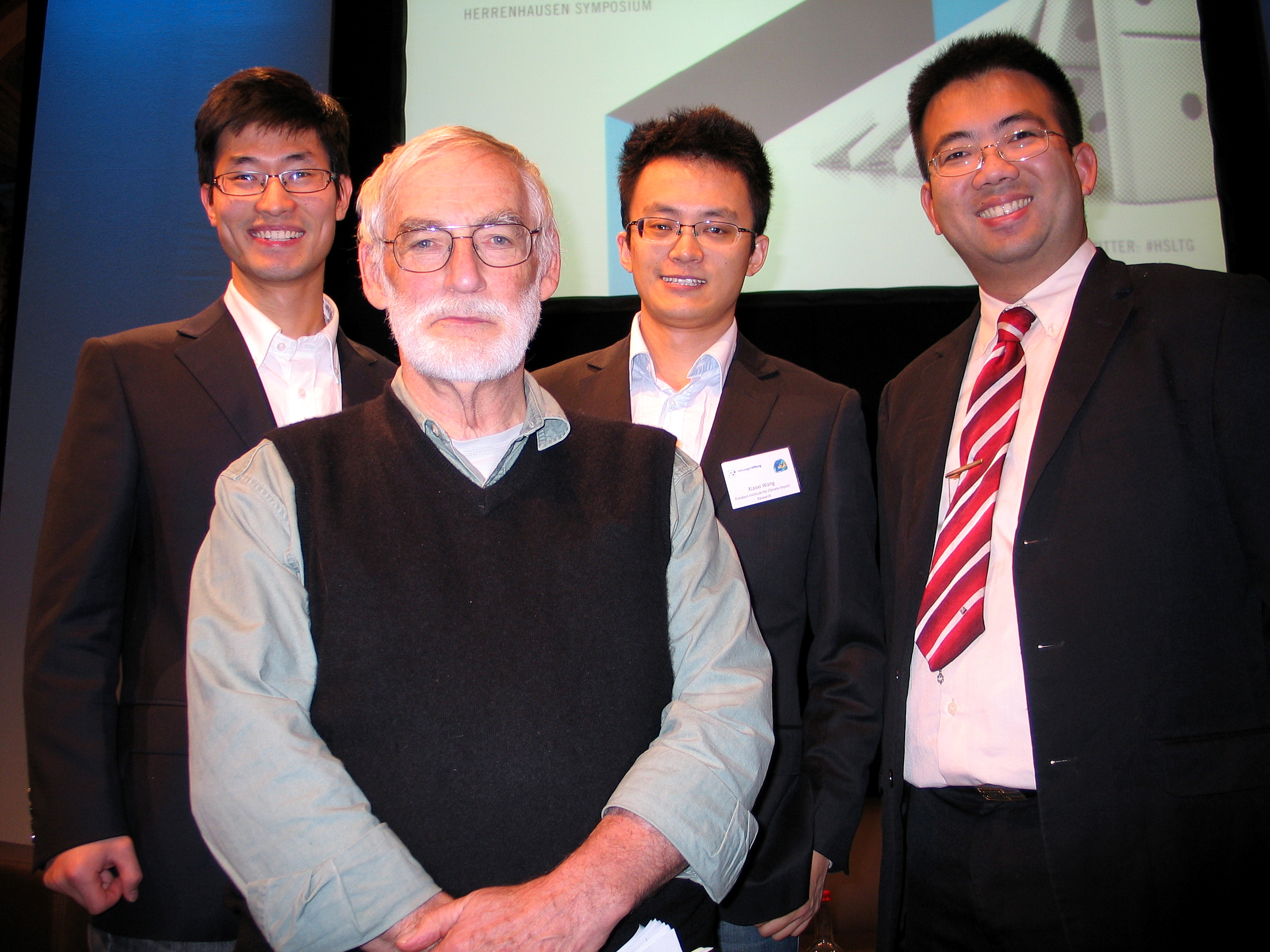
Researchers from China and Indonesia with Dennis Meadows

The Club of Rome has persisted after The Limits to Growth and has generally provided comprehensive updates to the book every five years.

An independent retrospective on the public debate over The Limits to Growth concluded in 1978 that optimistic attitudes had won out, causing a general loss of momentum in the environmental movement. While summarizing a large number of opposing arguments, the article concluded that "scientific arguments for and against each position ... have, it would seem, played only a small part in the general acceptance of alternative perspectives."

In 1989, a symposium was held in Hanover, entitled "Beyond the Limits to Growth: Global Industrial Society, Vision or Nightmare?" and in 1992, Beyond the Limits (BTL) was published as a 20-year update on the original material. It "concluded that two decades of history mainly supported the conclusions we had advanced 20 years earlier. But the 1992 book did offer one major new finding. We suggested in BTL that humanity had already overshot the limits of Earth's support capacity."

Limits to Growth: The 30-Year Update was published in 2004. The authors observed that "It is a sad fact that humanity has largely squandered the past 30 years in futile debates and well-intentioned, but halfhearted, responses to the global ecological challenge. We do not have another 30 years to dither. Much will have to change if the ongoing overshoot is not to be followed by collapse during the twenty-first century."

In 2012, the Smithsonian Institution held a symposium entitled "Perspectives on Limits to Growth". Another symposium was held in the same year by the Volkswagen Foundation, entitled "Already Beyond?"

Limits to Growth did not receive an official update in 2012, but one of its coauthors, Jørgen Randers, published a book, 2052: A Global Forecast for the Next Forty Years.

=== Comparisons and updated models ===
In 2008, physicist Graham Turner (Note: Dr Turner is an Honorary Senior Fellow with the Melbourne Sustainable Society Institute at the University of Melbourne.) at the Commonwealth Scientific and Industrial Research Organisation (CSIRO) in Australia published a paper called "A Comparison of 'The Limits to Growth' with Thirty Years of Reality". It compared the past thirty years of data with the eleven scenarios laid out in the 1972 book and found that changes in industrial production, food production, and pollution are all congruent with one of the book's eleven scenarios—that of "business as usual". This scenario in Limits points to economic and societal collapse in the 21st century. In 2010, Nørgård, Peet, and Ragnarsdóttir called the book a "pioneering report". They said that "its approach remains useful and that its conclusions are still surprisingly valid ... unfortunately the report has been largely dismissed by critics as a doomsday prophecy that has not held up to scrutiny."

Also in 2008, researcher Peter A. Victor wrote that even though the Limits team probably underestimated the price mechanism's role in adjusting outcomes, their critics have overestimated it. He states that Limits to Growth has had a significant impact on the conception of environmental issues and notes that (in his view) the models in the book were meant to be taken as predictions "only in the most limited sense of the word".

In a 2009 article published in American Scientist entitled Revisiting the Limits to Growth After Peak Oil, Hall and Day noted that "the values predicted by the limits-to-growth model and actual data for 2008 are very close." These findings are consistent with the 2008 CSIRO study, which concluded, "The analysis shows that 30 years of historical data compares favorably with key features ... [of the Limits to Growth] "standard run" scenario, which results in collapse of the global system midway through the 21st Century."

In 2011, Ugo Bardi published a book-length academic study of The Limits to Growth, its methods, and historical reception and concluded that "The warnings that we received in 1972 ... are becoming increasingly more worrisome as reality seems to be following closely the curves that the ... scenario had generated." A popular analysis of the accuracy of the report by science writer Richard Heinberg was also published.

In 2012, writing in American Scientist, Brian Hayes stated that the model is "more a polemical tool than a scientific instrument". He went on to say that the graphs generated by the computer program should not, as the authors note, be used as predictions.

In 2014, Turner concluded that "preparing for a collapsing global system could be even more important than trying to avoid collapse." Another 2014 study from the University of Melbourne confirmed that data closely tracked the World3 BAU model.

In 2015, researchers undertook a calibration of the updated World3-03 model using historical data from 1995 to 2012 to better understand the dynamics of today's economic and resource system. The results showed that human society has invested more to abate persistent pollution, increase food productivity, and have a more productive service sector; however, the broad trends within Limits to Growth still held true.

In 2016, a group of MPs in the UK established an all-party parliamentary group on limits to growth. Its initial report concluded that "there is unsettling evidence that society is still following the 'standard run' of the original study—in which overshoot leads to an eventual collapse of production and living standards." The report also points out that some issues not fully addressed in the original 1972 report, such as climate change, present additional challenges for human development.

In 2020, an analysis by Gaya Herrington, then Director of Sustainability Services of KPMG US, was published in Yale University's Journal of Industrial Ecology. The study assessed whether, given key data known in 2020 about factors important for the "Limits to Growth" report, the original report's conclusions are supported. In particular, the 2020 study examined updated quantitative information about ten factors, namely population, fertility rates, mortality rates, industrial output, food production, services, nonrenewable resources, persistent pollution, human welfare, and ecological footprint, and concluded that the "Limits to Growth" prediction is essentially correct in that continued economic growth is unsustainable under a "business as usual" model. The study found that current empirical data is broadly consistent with the 1972 projections and that if major changes to the consumption of resources are not undertaken, economic growth will peak and then rapidly decline by around 2040.

In 2023, the parameters of the World3 model were recalibrated using empirical data up to 2022. This improved parameter set results in a World3 simulation that shows the same overshoot and collapse mode in the coming decade as the original business-as-usual scenario of the Limits to Growth standard run. The main effect of the recalibration update is to raise the peaks of most variables and move them a few years into the future.

== Editions ==
- ISBN 0-87663-165-0, 1972 first edition (digital version)
- ISBN 0-87663-222-3, 1974 second edition (cloth)
- ISBN 0-87663-918-X, 1974 second edition (paperback)
- Meadows, Donella; Meadows, Dennis; Randers, Jorgen (1992). Beyond the Limits (Hardcover ed.). Chelsea Green Publishing. ISBN 0-930031-55-5.
- Meadows, Donella; Randers, Jorgen; Meadows, Dennis (June 2004). Limits To Growth: The 30-Year Update (Paperback ed.). Chelsea Green Publishing. ISBN 193149858X.
- Meadows, Donella; Randers, Jorgen; Meadows, Dennis (March 2005). Limits To Growth: The 30-Year Update (Hardcover ed.). Chelsea Green Publishing. ISBN 1931498512.

== See also ==
- Attractiveness principle – Systems dynamics archetype
- Albert Allen Bartlett – American physicist (1923–2013), author of Arithmetic, Population, and Energy
- Collapsology – Study of the risks of collapse of industrial civilization
- Cornucopianism – Ideological position in futurism
- Twelve leverage points (to intervene in a system if it is to be managed) – model proposed by Donella Meadows,
- DYNAMO (programming language) – Simulation language & graphical notation
- Degrowth – Philosophy calling for reduced consumption and production to achieve sustainability
- Ecological economics – Interdependence of human economies and natural ecosystems
- Ecological overshoot – Demands on ecosystem exceeding regeneration
- Economic growth – Measure of increase in market value of goods
- Energy crisis – Low availability of energy resources
- Energy development – Methods bringing energy into production
- The Global 2000 Report to the President – Report commissioned by President Jimmy Carter
- Global catastrophic risk – Hypothetical global-scale disaster risk
- Hubbert peak theory – One of the primary theories on peak oil
- Jevons paradox – Efficiency leads to increased demand
- Carlos Mallmann – Argentine physicist (1928–2020), proponent of the Latin American World Model
- Malthusian catastrophe – Idea about population growth and food supply
- Overconsumption – Resource use exceeding carrying capacity
- Overpopulation – Condition wherein human numbers exceed the carrying capacity of the environment
- Peak oil – Point in time when the maximum rate of petroleum extraction is reached
- Planetary boundaries – Limits to safe impact on the Earth ecology
- Population bottleneck – Sharp reduction in the size of a population
- Post-growth – Beyond optimum economic growth
- Productivism – Primacy of productivity and growth
- Richard Rainwater – American investor and philanthropist (1944–2015)
- Societal collapse – Fall of a complex human society
- Steady-state economy – Constant capital and population size
- System dynamics – Study of non-linear complex systems

Books:

- The Population Bomb – 1968 book predicting worldwide famine
- The Revenge of Gaia – 2006 book by James Lovelock
