= Donella Meadows =

American environmental scientist, teacher, and writer

- Born: Donella Hager; March 13, 1941; Elgin, Illinois, U.S.
- Died: February 20, 2001 (aged 59); Hanover, New Hampshire, U.S.
- Education: Carleton College (BA); Harvard University (PhD)
- Known for: The Limits to Growth; Twelve leverage points
- Spouse: Dennis Meadows
- Awards: MacArthur Fellowship (1994); Walter C. Paine Science Education Award (1990)
- Scientific career
- Fields: Environmental science, systems science
- Workplaces: Dartmouth, MIT

Donella Hager "Dana" Meadows (March 13, 1941 – February 20, 2001) was an American environmental scientist, educator, and writer. She is best known as lead author of the books The Limits to Growth and Thinking In Systems: A Primer.

== Early life and education ==
Born in Elgin, Illinois, Meadows was educated in science, receiving a B.A. in chemistry from Carleton College in 1963 and a PhD in biophysics from Harvard in 1968. After a yearlong trip from England to Sri Lanka and back, she became a research fellow at the Massachusetts Institute of Technology as a member of a team in the department created by Jay Forrester, the inventor of system dynamics as well as the principle of magnetic data storage for computers.

== Career ==
Meadows taught at Dartmouth College for 29 years, beginning in 1972.

She was honored both as a Pew Scholar in Conservation and Environment (1991) and as a MacArthur Fellow (1994). She received the Walter C. Paine Science Education Award in 1990. Posthumously, she received the John H. Chafee Excellence in Environmental Affairs Award for 2001, presented by the Conservation Law Foundation.

Meadows wrote "The Global Citizen," a weekly column on world events from a systems point of view. Many of these columns were compiled and published as a book of the same name. Her work is recognized as a formative influence on hundreds of other academic studies, government policy initiatives, and international agreements.

She was a longtime member of the United States Association for the Club of Rome, which instituted an award in her memory, the US Association for the Club of Rome Donella Meadows Award in Sustainable Global Actions. The award is given to an outstanding individual who has created actions in a global framework toward the sustainability goals Meadows expressed in her writings.

== Work ==
=== The Limits to Growth ===
In 1972, Meadows was on the MIT team that produced the global computer model "World3" for the Club of Rome, providing the basis for The Limits to Growth. The book reported a study of long-term global trends in population, economics, and the environment. The book made headlines around the world and began a debate about the limits of Earth's capacity to support human economic expansion—a debate that continues to this day. Meadows was the book's lead author, and it had three coauthors: her husband Dennis Meadows, Jørgen Randers, and William W. Behrens III.

=== The Balaton Group ===
In 1982, Donella and Dennis Meadows created an international "network of networks" for leading researchers on resource use, environmental conservation, systems modeling, and sustainability. Since its foundation, the members have met at Lake Balaton, Hungary, every autumn. While the formal name for the network was the International Network of Resource Information Centres (INRIC), it became more popularly known as the Balaton Group, after the location of its meetings.

=== The Academy for Systems Change ===
Meadows founded the Sustainability Institute in 1996, which combined research in global systems with practical demonstrations of sustainable living, including the development of a cohousing (or ecovillage) and organic farm at Cobb Hill in Hartland, Vermont. In 2011, the Sustainability Institute, originally adjacent to Cobb Hill, was renamed the Donella Meadows Institute and moved to Norwich, Vermont. Additional organizations that sprang from the Sustainability Institute include Sustainable Food Lab, Climate Interactive, and Sustainability Leaders Network. In 2016, the Donella Meadows Institute was renamed for a second time, and now operates as the Academy for Systems Change: https://www.academyforchange.org

=== State of the Village report ===
In 1990, Meadows published the State of the Village report under the title, "Who lives in the 'Global Village'?" which likened the world to a village of 1,000 people. Since then, "If the world were a village of 100 people", derived from her work but further reducing the numbers to those of a village of 100 people, has been published by others in English, Spanish, and Japanese.

=== Twelve leverage points ===
Meadows published Leverage Points: Places to Intervene in a System, one of her best-known essays, in 1999. It describes the most and least effective types of interventions in a system (of any kind).

== Personal life ==
Donella Meadows was married to Dennis Meadows. She died of cerebral meningitis in 2001 at the age of 59.

== Selected publications ==
- Donella H. Meadows, et al. Limits to Growth: A Report for the Club of Rome's Project on the Predicament of Mankind, New American Library, 1977, paperback, ISBN 0-451-13695-0; Universe Books, paperback, 1972, 0–87663–165–0 (scarce); ISBN Universe Books, hardcover, 1972, ISBN 0-87663-222-3 (scarce); digital edition of 1972 printing, produced by the Dartmouth College Library.
- Dennis L. Meadows, Donella H. Meadows, Eds. Toward Global Equilibrium: Collected Papers, Pegasus Communications, 1973, hardcover ISBN 0-262-13143-9
- Donella H. Meadows, John M. Richardson and Gerhart Bruckmann, Groping in the Dark: The First Decade of Global Modelling, John Wiley & Sons, 1982, paperback, ISBN 0-471-10027-7
- Donella H. Meadows and J. M. Robinson, The Electronic Oracle: Computer Models and Social Decisions, John Wiley & Sons, 1985, hardcover, 462 pages, ISBN 0-471-90558-5
- Michael J. Caduto, foreword by Donella H. Meadows, illustrated by Joan Thomson, Pond and Brook: A Guide to Nature in Freshwater Environments, University Press of New England, 1990, paperback, 288 pages, ISBN 0-87451-509-2
- Donella H. Meadows, Global Citizen, Island Press, 1991, paperback 197 pages, ISBN 1-55963-058-2
- Donella H. Meadows et al. Beyond the limits : global collapse or a sustainable future, Earthscan Publications, 1992, ISBN 1-85383-130-1
- Dennis L. Meadows, Donella H. Meadows and Jorgen Randers, Beyond the Limits: Confronting Global Collapse, Envisioning a Sustainable Future, Chelsea Green Publishing, 1993, paperback, 320 pages, ISBN 0-930031-62-8
- edited by Sandi Brockway, foreword by Marilyn Ferguson, introduction by Denis Hayes, preface by Donella H. Meadows, Macrocosm U. S. A.: Possibilities for a New Progressive Era..., Macrocosm, 1993, paperback, 464 pages, ISBN 0-9632315-5-3
- Donella H. Meadows, Jorgen Randers and Dennis L. Meadows Limits to Growth-The 30 year Update, 2004, hardcover ISBN 1-931498-51-2
- Donella H. Meadows (2008) Thinking in Systems: A Primer, Chelsea Green Publishing ISBN 978-1-60358-055-7.

== See also ==
- Amory Lovins
- Cobb Hill
- Dennis Meadows
- System dynamics
- DYNAMO (programming language)
- Academy for Systems Change
