= Guy Irving Burch =

Biography of Guy Irving Burch, founder of the Population Reference Bureau

Guy Irving Burch (1899 – January 13, 1951) was an American eugenicist and the founding director of the Population Reference Bureau. Burch coined the phrase "population explosion" during the 1930s, when demographers in the United States and Western Europe were warning of imminent population decline. After World War II, he became a proponent of global population control.

== Early life and education ==
Burch was born in Clayton, NM in 1899. He attended Culver Military Training Academy in Indiana, the Cavalry Officers' Training School in Texas, and Columbia University in New York. He was heavily influenced by such books as The Passing of the Great Race by Madison Grant (1916), The Rising Tide of Color Against White World Supremacy by Lothrop Stoddard (1920), Mankind at the Crossroads by Edward Murray East (1923), and Standing Room Only? by Edward A. Ross (1927).

== Professional Activities ==
Burch established the Population Reference Bureau in New York in 1929 and moved it to Washington, D.C. shortly thereafter. He was the co-author, with the sociologist, Elmer Pendell, of a self-published 1945 book titled Population Roads to Peace or War, which was republished by Penguin in 1947 as Human Breeding and Survival. The geneticist Bentley Glass described the book as "well written and interesting in style," but "loose and uncritical in analysis and opinion." He predicted that it would "exert a wide but unfortunate influence." Glass's prediction was correct. Burch and Pendell's book was enormously influential, inspiring Road to Survival by William Vogt and Our Plundered Planet by Fairfield Osborn (son of Henry Fairfield Osborn), which in turn inspired The Population Bomb by Paul Ehrlich. It was also a major inspiration for the population activities of Hugh Moore.

While advocating population control overseas, Burch advocated eugenics in the United States to increase the birthrate among high-IQ parents and reduce it among low-IQ parents. He also campaigned against immigration to the United States both before and after World War II. Burch was a member of the Population Association of America, the American Eugenics Society, the Phi Delta Theta fraternity, and the Sons of the American Revolution.

== Personal life ==
Burch married Wilhelmine Taylor in 1920, with whom he had two daughters. He died at the age of 51 from complications of a heart ailment.
