= Hugh Moore (businessman) =

American businessman

Hugh Everett Moore (1887–1972) was an advertising expert and the founder and longtime president of the Dixie Cup Company, manufacturer of the disposable paper Dixie Cup. Inspired by William Vogt’s book Road to Survival, Moore started to work outside his business, using his fortune and expertise to support the development of transatlantic structures facilitating international peace and influence population discourse and policy for the primary purpose of decreasing the number of humans.

== Diplomatic, political and advocacy activities ==
In addition to his success in the cup business, Moore held many functions in the field of international relations, playing a role in the stabilization of world politics during and after the Second World War. He was founding member of the Committee to Defend America by Aiding the Allies in 1940; chairman of the executive committee of the US League of Nations Association from 1940 to 1943 and president of Americans United for World Organisation, 1944.

In 1944, Moore founded the Hugh Moore Fund for International Peace to fund organizations involved in population control. The Fund published Moore's pamphlet "The Population Bomb is Everyone's Baby" in 1954. He was credited by the authors of the globally bestselling 1968 book "The Population Bomb", Anne Howland Ehrlich and Paul R. Ehrlich to have used these words first.

Moore was a consultant to the State Department at the United Nations Conference in 1945.

Moore was a member of the American Association for the United Nations from 1945 to 1954. He served as treasurer of the Committee for the Marshall Plan in 1948. Moore was a member of the Atlantic Union Committee from 1949 to 1960 and Chair of the Executive Committee from 1949 to 1951. He was chairman of the finance committee of the Woodrow Wilson Foundation from 1951 to 1952 and chairman of the fundraising arm of the UN education program in 1955.

He was a member of the US Committee on NATO from 1961 to 1972. Moore was Chairman of the Board of the Population Reference Bureau, vice-president of International Planned Parenthood Federation in 1964, president of the Association for Voluntary Sterilization from 1964 to 1969, and cofounder of the Population Crisis Committee in 1965.

== Awards and honors ==
Hugh Moore received an honorary degree of Humane Letters from Lafayette College in 1961.
