= The Population Bomb =

1968 book predicting worldwide famine

- Authors: Paul R. Ehrlich; Anne Howland Ehrlich
- Language: English
- Subject: Population
- Publisher: Sierra Club; Ballantine Books
- Publication date: 1968
- Publication place: United States
- Pages: 201
- ISBN: 1-56849-587-0

The Population Bomb is a 1968 book co-authored by former Stanford University professor Paul R. Ehrlich and former Stanford senior researcher in conservation biology Anne H. Ehrlich. From the opening page, it predicted worldwide famines due to overpopulation, as well as other major societal upheavals, and advocated immediate action to limit population growth. Fears of a "population explosion" existed in the mid-20th century baby boom years, but the book and its authors brought the idea to an even wider audience.

The book has been criticized since its publication for an alarmist tone, and over the subsequent decades, for inaccurate assertions and failed predictions. For instance, regional famines have occurred since the publication of the book, but not world famines. The Ehrlichs themselves continued to stand by the book despite the flaws identified by its critics, with Paul stating in 2009 that "perhaps the most serious flaw in The Bomb was that it was much too optimistic about the future," despite having predicted catastrophic global famines that never came to pass. They believe that it achieved their goals because "it alerted people to the importance of environmental issues and brought human numbers into the debate on the human future." Others have argued that the basic thesis of the book was "far more prescient than most in recognizing the diverse contemporary threats posed by the size and growth rate of the human population, not only to adequate food supply but also to Earth's climate, air quality, fresh water, and biodiversity, as well as to the management capacity of governments."

== General description of the book ==
Graph of human population from 10,000 BC to 2017 AD. It shows the extremely rapid growth in the world population since the eighteenth century.

The Population Bomb was written at the suggestion of David Brower, the executive director of the environmentalist Sierra Club, and Ian Ballantine of Ballantine Books following various public appearances Ehrlich had made regarding population issues and their relation to the environment. Although the Ehrlichs collaborated on the book, the publisher insisted that a single author be credited, and also asked to change their preferred title: Population, Resources, and Environment. The title Population Bomb was taken (with permission) from General William H. Draper, founder of the Population Crisis Committee and a widely spread pamphlet The Population Bomb is Everyone's Baby issued in 1954 by the Hugh Moore Fund. The Ehrlichs regret the choice of title, which they admit was a perfect choice from a marketing perspective, but think that "it led Paul to be miscategorized as solely focused on human numbers, despite our interest in all the factors affecting the human trajectory."

Early editions of The Population Bomb began with the statement:

The battle to feed all of humanity is over. In the 1970s hundreds of millions of people will starve to death in spite of any crash programs embarked upon now. At this late date nothing can prevent a substantial increase in the world death rate...

Much of the book is spent describing the state of the environment and the food security situation, which is described as increasingly dire. The Ehrlichs argue that as the existing population was not being fed adequately, and as it was growing rapidly, it was unreasonable to expect sufficient improvements in food production to feed everyone. They further argued that the growing population placed escalating strains on all aspects of the natural world. "What needs to be done?" they wrote, "We must rapidly bring the world population under control, reducing the growth rate to zero or making it negative. Conscious regulation of human numbers must be achieved. Simultaneously we must, at least temporarily, greatly increase our food production."

=== Possible solutions ===
Paul and Anne Ehrlich described a number of "ideas on how these goals might be reached." They believed that the United States should take a leading role in population control, both because it was already consuming much more than the rest of the world, and therefore had a moral duty to reduce its impact, and because the US would have to lead international efforts due to its prominence in the world, in order to avoid charges of hypocrisy or racism it would have to take the lead in population reduction efforts. The Ehrlichs float the idea of adding "temporary sterilants" to the water supply or staple foods. However, they reject the idea as unpractical due to "criminal inadequacy of biomedical research in this area." They suggest a tax scheme in which additional children would add to a family's tax burden at increasing rates for more children, as well as luxury taxes on childcare goods. They suggest incentives for men who agree to permanent sterilization before they have two children, as well as a variety of other monetary incentives. They propose a powerful Department of Population and Environment which "should be set up with the power to take whatever steps are necessary to establish a reasonable population size in the United States and to put an end to the steady deterioration of our environment." The department should support research into population control, such as better contraceptives, mass sterilizing agents, and prenatal sex discernment (because families often continue to have children until a male is born. The Ehrlichs suggested that if they could choose a male child this would reduce the birthrate). Legislation should be enacted guaranteeing the right to an abortion, and sex education should be expanded.

After explaining the domestic policies the US should pursue, they discuss, foreign policy. They advocate a system of "triage," such as that suggested by William and Paul Paddock in Famine 1975!. Under this system countries would be divided into categories based on their abilities to feed themselves going forward. Countries with sufficient programmes in place to limit population growth, and the ability to become self-sufficient in the future would continue to receive food aid. Countries, for example India, which were "so far behind in the population-food game that there is no hope that our food aid will see them through to self-sufficiency" would have their food aid eliminated. The Ehrlichs argued that this was the only realistic strategy in the long-term. Ehrlich applauds the Paddocks' "courage and foresight" in proposing such a solution. The Ehrlichs further discuss the need to set up public education programs and agricultural development schemes in developing countries. They argue that the scheme would likely have to be implemented outside the framework of the United Nations due to the necessity of selecting the targeted regions and countries, and suggest that within countries certain regions should be prioritized to the extent that cooperative separatist movements should be encouraged if they are an improvement over the existing authority. He mentions his support for government mandated sterilization of Indian males with three or more children.

In the rest of the book the Ehrlichs discuss things which readers can do to help. This is focused primarily on changing public opinion to create pressure on politicians to enact the policies they suggest, which they believed were not politically possible in 1968. At the end of the book they discuss the possibility that his forecasts may be wrong, which they felt they must acknowledge as scientists. However, they believe that regardless of coming catastrophes, his prescriptions would only benefit humanity, and would be the right course of action in any case.

The book sold over two million copies, raised the general awareness of population and environmental issues, and influenced 1960s and 1970s public policy. For the 14 years prior to the book's appearance, the world population had been growing at accelerating rates, but immediately after the book's publication, the world population growth rate coincidentally began a continuing downward trend, from its 1968 peak of 2.09% to 1.09% in 2018.

== Context ==
In 1948, two widely read books were published that would inspire a "neo-Malthusian" debate on population and the environment: Fairfield Osborn's Our Plundered Planet and William Vogt's Road to Survival. These inspired works such as The Population Bomb is Everyone's Baby pamphlet by Hugh Everett Moore in 1954, as well as some of the original societies concerned with population and environmental matters. In 1961 Marriner Eccles, former chairman of the board of the Federal Reserve System, did describe the explosive rate of growth of the world's population as the "most vitally important problem facing the world today," which may well prove to be "more explosive than the atomic or hydrogen bomb." D.B. Luten has said that although the book is often seen as a seminal work in the field, The Population Bomb is actually best understood as "climaxing and in a sense terminating the debate of the 1950s and 1960s.” Ehrlich has said that he traced his own Malthusian beliefs to a lecture he heard Vogt give when he was attending university in the early 1950s. For Ehrlich, these writers provided “a global framework for things he had observed as a young naturalist."

== Criticisms ==
=== Restatement of Malthusian theory ===
The Population Bomb has been characterized by critics as primarily a repetition of the Malthusian catastrophe argument that population growth will outpace agricultural growth unless controlled. Ehrlich observed that since about 1930 the population of the world had doubled within a single generation, from 2 billion to nearly 4 billion, and was on track to do so again. He assumed that available resources on the other hand, and in particular food, were nearly at their limits. Some critics compare Ehrlich unfavorably to Malthus, saying that although Thomas Malthus did not make a firm prediction of imminent catastrophe, Ehrlich warned of a potential massive disaster within the next decade or two. In addition, critics state that unlike Malthus, Ehrlich did not see any means of avoiding the disaster entirely (although some mitigation was possible), and proposed solutions that were much more radical than those discussed by Malthus, such as starving whole countries that refused to implement population control measures.

Ehrlich was certainly not unique in his neo-Malthusian predictions, and there was a widespread belief in the 1960s and 1970s that increasingly catastrophic famines were on their way.

=== Predictions ===
The Ehrlichs made a number of specific predictions that did not come to pass, for which they have received criticism. They have acknowledged that some predictions were incorrect. However, they maintain that their general argument remains intact, that their predictions were merely illustrative, that their and others' warnings caused preventive action, or that many of their predictions may yet come true. Still other commentators have criticized the Ehrlichs' perceived inability to acknowledge mistakes, evasiveness, and refusal to alter their arguments in the face of contrary evidence. In 2015 Ehrlich told Retro Report, "I do not think my language was too apocalyptic in The Population Bomb. My language would be even more apocalyptic today."

In The Population Bomb's opening lines the authors state that nothing can prevent famines in which hundreds of millions of people will die during the 1970s (amended to 1970s and 1980s in later editions), and that there would be "a substantial increase in the world death rate." Although many lives could be saved through dramatic action, it was already too late to prevent a substantial increase in the global death rate. However, in reality the global death rate has continued to decline substantially since then, from 13/1000 in 1965–74 to 10/1000 from 1985–1990. Meanwhile, the population of the world has more than doubled, while calories consumed/person have increased 24%. The UN does not keep official death-by-hunger statistics so it is hard to measure whether the "hundreds of millions of deaths" number is correct. Ehrlich himself suggested in 2009 that between 200–300 million had died of hunger since 1968. However, that is measured over 40 years rather than the ten to twenty foreseen in the book, so it can be seen as significantly fewer than predicted.

Famine has not been eliminated, but its root cause has been political instability, not global food shortage. The Indian economist and Nobel Memorial Prize winner, Amartya Sen, has argued that nations with democracy and a free press have virtually never suffered from extended famines. And while a 2010 UN report stated that 925 million of the world's population of nearly seven billion people were in a constant state of hunger, it also notes that the percentage of the world's population who qualify as "undernourished" has fallen by more than half, from 33 percent to about 16 percent, since the Ehrlichs published The Population Bomb.

The Ehrlichs write: "I don't see how India could possibly feed two hundred million more people by 1980." This view was widely held at the time, as another statement of his, later in the book: "I have yet to meet anyone familiar with the situation who thinks that India will be self-sufficient in food by 1971." In the book's 1971 edition, the latter prediction was removed, as the food situation in India suddenly improved

As of 2010, India had almost 1.2 billion people, having nearly tripled its population from around 400 million in 1960, with a total fertility rate in 2008 of 2.6. While the absolute numbers of malnourished children in India is high, the rates of malnutrition and poverty in India have declined from approximately 90% at the time of India's formation (1947), to less than 40% in 2010. Ehrlich's prediction about famines did not come to pass, although food security is still an issue in India. However, most epidemiologists, public health physicians and demographers identify corruption as the chief cause of malnutrition, not "overpopulation". As economist and philosopher Amartya Sen noted, the subcontinent frequently had famines during British colonial rule. However, since India became a democracy, there have been no recorded famines.

Journalist Dan Gardner has criticized Ehrlich both for his overconfident predictions and his refusal to acknowledge his errors. "In two lengthy interviews, Ehrlich admitted making not a single major error in the popular works he published in the late 1960s and early 1970s … the only flat-out mistake Ehrlich acknowledges is missing the destruction of the rain forests, which happens to be a point that supports and strengthens his world view—and is therefore, in cognitive dissonance terms, not a mistake at all. Beyond that, he was by his account, off a little here and there, but only because the information he got from others was wrong. Basically, he was right across the board."

Jonathan Last called it "one of the most spectacularly foolish books ever published".

=== Persistence of trends ===
Economist Julian Simon and medical statistician Hans Rosling pointed out that the failed prediction of 70s famines were based exclusively on the assumption that exponential population growth will continue indefinitely and no technological or social progress will be made. In The Ultimate Resource Simon argued that resources, such as metals, which the Ehrlichs extensively discuss in their books as examples of non-sustainable resources, are valued exclusively for the function they provide, and technological progress frequently replaces these: for example, copper was largely replaced by fiber optic in communications, and carbon fiber replaced a wide range of alloys and steel in construction. Simon also argued that technological progress tends to happen in large steps rather than linear growth, as happened with the Green Revolution. Hans Rosling in his book Factfulness demonstrated that the fertility rate has significantly decreased worldwide and, more importantly, high fertility is a natural response to high mortality in low-income countries and once they enter a higher income group, fertility drops quickly. According to environmentalist Stewart Brand, himself a student and friend of Ehrlich, the assumption made by the latter and by authors of The Limits to Growth has been "proven wrong since 1963" when the demographic trends worldwide have visibly changed.

=== Showmanship ===
One frequent criticism of The Population Bomb is that it focused on spectacle and exaggeration at the expense of accuracy. Pierre Desrochers and Christine Hoffbauer remark that "at the time of writing The Population Bomb, Paul and Anne Ehrlich should have been more cautious and revised their tone and rhetoric, in light of the undeniable and already apparent errors and shortcomings of Osborn and Vogt's analyses." Charles Rubin has written that it was precisely because Ehrlich was largely unoriginal and wrote in a clear emotionally gripping style that it became so popular. He quotes a review from Natural History noting that Ehrlich does not try to "convince intellectually by mind dulling statistics," but rather roars "like an Old Testament Prophet." Gardner says, "as much as the events and culture of the era, Paul Ehrlich's style explain the enormous audience he attracted." Indeed, an appearance on The Tonight Show Starring Johnny Carson helped to propel the success of the book, as well as Ehrlich's celebrity. Desrochers and Hoffbauer go on to conclude that it seems hard to deny that using an alarmist tone and emotional appeal were the main lessons that the present generation of environmentalists learned from Ehrlich's success.

=== Social and political coercion ===
On the political left the book received criticism that it was focusing on "the wrong problem", and that the real issue was one of distribution of resources rather than of overpopulation. Marxists worried that Paul and Anne Ehrlich's work could be used to justify genocide and imperial control, as well as oppression of minorities and disadvantaged groups or even a return to eugenics.

Eco-socialist Barry Commoner argued that the Ehrlichs were too focused on overpopulation as the source of environmental problems, and that their proposed solutions were politically unacceptable because of the coercion that they implied, and because the cost would fall disproportionately on the poor. He argued that technological, and above all social development would lead to a natural decrease in both population growth and environmental damage. Commoner engaged in a fierce debate with Ehrlich at an environmental United Nations convention in Stockholm:

A feud about how to deal with overpopulation surfaced in Stockholm, between Ehrlich and his nemesis, Barry Commoner, whose popular book, The Closing Circle (1971), directly criticized Ehrlich's population-bomb thesis. Both were on panels in Stockholm, with Commoner slyly planting invidious questions aimed at Ehrlich among various Third World participants in the conference, and Ehrlich yelling back. Commoner’s argument was that population policies weren't needed, because what was called "the demographic transition" would take care of everything—all you had to do was help poor people get less poor, and they would have fewer children. Ehrlich insisted that the situation was way too serious for that approach, and it wouldn't work anyway: You needed harsh government programs to drive down the birthrate. The alternative was overwhelming famines and massive damage to the environment.

— Stewart Brand, Whole Earth Discipline, 2010

== Ehrlich's response ==
In a 2004 Grist Magazine interview, Ehrlich acknowledged some specific predictions he had made, in the years around the time The Population Bomb was published, that had not come to pass. However, as to a number of his fundamental ideas and assertions, he maintained that facts and science proved them correct.

In answer to the question: "Were your predictions in The Population Bomb right?", Ehrlich responded:

Anne and I have always followed UN population projections as modified by the Population Reference Bureau—so we never made "predictions," even though idiots think we have. When I wrote The Population Bomb in 1968, there were 3.5 billion people. Since then we've added another 2.8 billion—many more than the total population (2 billion) when I was born in 1932. If that's not a population explosion, what is? My basic claims (and those of the many scientific colleagues who reviewed my work) were that population growth was a major problem. Fifty-eight academies of science said that same thing in 1994, as did the world scientists' warning to humanity in the same year. My view has become depressingly mainline!

In another retrospective article published in 2009, Ehrlich said, in response to criticism that many of his predictions had not come to pass:

the biggest tactical error in The Bomb was the use of scenarios, stories designed to help one think about the future. Although we clearly stated that they were not predictions and that "we can be sure that none of them will come true as stated," (p. 72)—their failure to occur is often cited as a failure of prediction. In honesty, the scenarios were way off, especially in their timing (we underestimated the resilience of the world system). But they did deal with future issues that people in 1968 should have been thinking about—famines, plagues, water shortages, armed international interventions by the United States, and nuclear winter (e.g., Ehrlich et al. 1983, Toon et al. 2007)—all events that have occurred or now still threaten

In a 2018 interview with The Guardian, Ehrlich, while still proud of The Population Bomb for starting a worldwide debate on the issues of population, acknowledged weaknesses of the book including not placing enough emphasis on climate change, overconsumption and inequality, and countering accusations of racism. He argues "too many rich people in the world is a major threat to the human future, and cultural and genetic diversity are great human resources." He advocated for an "unprecedented redistribution of wealth" in order to mitigate the problem of overconsumption of resources by the world's wealthy, but said "the rich who now run the global system—that hold the annual 'world destroyer' meetings in Davos—are unlikely to let it happen."

== See also ==
- Club of Rome
- Simon–Ehrlich wager
- Moral panic
- Population decline
- The Decline of the West
- Z.P.G.
