= The Winnowing =

- Short story by Isaac Asimov
- Country: United States
- Language: English
- Genre: Science fiction

Publication
- Published in: Analog
- Publication type: Periodical
- Publisher: Universal Publishing
- Media type: Print (Magazine, Hardback & Paperback)
- Publication date: February 1976

"The Winnowing" is a science fiction short story by American writer Isaac Asimov.

== Plot summary ==
In the year 2005, the world's population of six billion is suffering from acute famine. The World Food Organization decides on desperate measures to decrease the population by a process of triage. They propose to do this by adding selective poisons to certain food shipments to grossly over-populated areas.

They attempt to blackmail biochemist Dr. Aaron Rodman into cooperating with their scheme (threatening to withhold food rations from his daughter's family if he doesn't comply), proposing to utilise his development of LP – a lipoprotein which when incorporated into foods will cause random deaths.

The scheme is planned but Rodman is unwilling to go along with it. At a meeting between him and senior government officials and members of the World Food Council, he provides sandwiches laced with the LP as refreshment, so that they will die at random, just as they had planned for so many others. He carefully matches the LP in the sandwiches (which he also eats) to his own metabolism, so that he will die quickly and not be guilty of involvement in the scheme.

== Criticism ==
This story is generally used as a critique of the environmentalist movements. It has been especially referenced as an aside to insult climate summits such as the COP conferences, where population reduction through less extreme measures have been discussed. Especially in the reference to how those who say others must die are all well fed, and how the discussion about global hunger requires snacks to be provided.

== See also ==
- The Population Bomb by Paul R. Ehrlich
- Famine 1975!
- Lifeboat ethics
