= Our Plundered Planet =

1948 environmental book by Fairfield Osborn

- First US edition, Little, Brown and Company
- Author: Fairfield Osborn
- Language: English
- Subject: Environment
- Genre: Non-fiction
- Publisher: Little, Brown and Company
- Publication date: March 25, 1948
- Publication place: United States

Our Plundered Planet is a book published in 1948 by American conservationist Fairfield Osborn about environmental destruction by humankind. With a focus on soil, the book is a critique of humankind's poor stewardship of Earth. It typifies the earliest apocalyptic environmental literature, in which human beings are seen as destroyers of the natural world.

Our Plundered Planet, along with William Vogt's Road to Survival, also published in 1948, launched a Malthusian revival in the post-WWII era, and would inspire Anne Howland Ehrlich and her colleague and husband Paul R. Ehrlich, authors of The Population Bomb, The Dominant Animal and more than 30 other books on overpopulation and ecology.

== Influences ==
In writing this book, Osborn was influenced by Guy I. Burch and Elmer Pendell's overpopulation tract Population Roads to Peace or War (1945) and Paul Sears' analysis of dust bowls in Deserts on the March (1935). He had also been influenced by various "New Deal" initiatives in the public planning of land use and restoration, such as the creation of the Tennessee Valley Authority, the Civilian Conservation Corps and various policies to address the "Dust Bowls" of the time. Osborn, as well as his famous father, Henry Fairfield Osborn, was also heavily influenced by the eugenics movement before World War II.

== Editions ==
- US edition: Little, Brown and Company, 1948.
- UK edition: Faber and Faber, London, 1948.
- French translation published in 1949 (La planète au pillage).
- German edition: 1950, Pan-Verlag, Zürich, Switzerland, translated by Fritz Levi, foreword: Paul Reiwald (Univ. Genf), title: Unsere ausgeplünderte Erde, 161 pages.

Our Plundered Planet has been reprinted at least eight times and been translated into over a dozen languages since original publication.

== See also ==
- Road to Survival, a 1948 book by William Vogt on similar topics
