= From Population Control to Reproductive Health =

From Population Control to Reproductive Health: Malthusian Arithmetic is a book by Mohan Rao. It is a critique of the post-1990s Indian family planning system.

In it, Rao endeavors to critique the family-planning programme in India, its assumptions, unstated bias, and implications. It describes the approach for health in India which is more about doctors, hospitals, and technical interventions rather than living conditions, work environment, and access to food etc., criticizing the over-dependence on technology in family planning program, and traces the evolution and growth of family-planning program in India. It also talks about the death and resurfacing of eugenic ideas, Malthusianism and Neo-Malthusian approach to population and the impact of the International Conference on Population and Development etc.

It has been described as being outstanding for the depth of scholarship and insights of the author, and as having important policy implications.

== Citation ==
- Rao, M. (2004). From Population Control to Reproductive Health: Malthusian Arithmetic. New Delhi: Sage publication. ISBN 9780761932697
