= Famine 1975! =

Book by William and Paul Paddock

Famine 1975! America's Decision: Who Will Survive?
- Authors: William Paddock; Paul Paddock
- Language: English
- Subject: Population
- Publisher: Little, Brown and Co.
- Publication date: 1967
- Publication place: United States
- Media type: Print
- Pages: 286

Famine 1975! America's Decision: Who Will Survive? is a best-selling 1967 book by William and Paul Paddock. The brothers describe the rapidly growing population of the world, and a situation in which they believe it would be impossible to feed the entire global population within the short-term future. They believed that widespread famine would be the inevitable result, by 1975.

The basic argument of the book is summarized in a 1969 review by Bruce Trumbo:

1. The underdeveloped nations have exploding populations and static agricultures.
2. The "Time of Famines" will be seriously in evidence by 1975, when food crises will have been reached in several of these nations.
3. The "stricken peoples will not be able to pay for all their needed food imports. Therefore the hunger in these regions can be alleviated only through the charity of other nations" (p. 205)
4. The only important food in famine relief will be wheat, and only the United States, Canada, Australia, and Argentina grow significant amounts of wheat.
5. The United States, the only one of these four countries that has historically given wheat to hungry nations, is the "sole hope of the hungry nations" in the future (p. 206)
6. "Yet the United States, even if it fully cultivates all its land, even if it opens every spigot of charity, will not have enough wheat and other foodstuffs to keep alive all the starving" (p. 206)
7. "Therefore, the United States must decide to which countries it will send food, to which countries it will not."

In response, they suggest a system of triage in which the United States must "divide the underdeveloped nations into three categories: 1) Those so hopelessly headed for or in the grip of famine (whether because of overpopulation, agricultural insufficiency, or political ineptness) that our aid will be a waste; these "can't-be-saved nations" will be ignored and left to their fate; 2) Those who are suffering but who will stagger through without our aid, "the walking wounded"; and 3) Those who can be saved by our help."

The Paddocks were aware that their policy of abandoning food aid to the "hopeless countries" (India and Egypt for example) would lead to an immediate worsening of the situation there, but they wrote "to send food is to throw sand in the ocean." Using the triage system they hoped to avoid a broader catastrophe and stabilize the global population.

Paul R. Ehrlich, who wrote bestseller The Population Bomb along similar lines the following year, lavishly praised the book, calling it courageous for daring to address the problems of the age in a concrete way, and one of the most important books of our age. Others criticized the use of extrapolated, and sometimes incorrect, statistics and assumptions to make such drastic and consequential conclusions. The book is often cited as a classic example of the neo-Malthusian revival of the 1950s-1970s.

The premise of the book was found to be incorrect. This was addressed through policies such as public food distribution and work-for-food programs, alongside the adoption of technology and hybrid seeds to enhance food production - the Green Revolution - the situation changed drastically over the final decades of the 20th century.
