= Winnowing (disambiguation) =

Winnowing is an agricultural method for separating grain from chaff.

Winnowing may also refer to:

- Winnowing (sedimentology), a natural sediment separation process
- Winnowing (snipe) or drumming, a courtship sound
- "The Winnowing", a 1976 short story by Isaac Asimov
