= Anne H. Ehrlich =

American conservation biologist and writer

Anne Howland Ehrlich
- Born: Anne Fitzhugh Howland; November 17, 1933 (age 92); Des Moines
- Education: University of Kansas
- Occupations: Scientist; author
- Works: see list
- Spouse: Paul R. Ehrlich (m. 1954; died 2026)
- Children: 1
- Scientific career
- Fields: Conservation biology
- Workplaces: Stanford University

Anne Howland Ehrlich (born Anne Fitzhugh Howland; November 17, 1933) is an American scientist and author who is best known for the predictions she made as a co-author of The Population Bomb with her colleague and husband, Paul R. Ehrlich. She has written or co-written more than thirty books on overpopulation and ecology, including The Stork and the Plow (1995), with Gretchen Daily, and The Dominant Animal: Human Evolution and the Environment (2008), among many other works. She also has written extensively on issues of public concern such as population control, environmental protection, and environmental consequences of nuclear war.

She is seen as a key figure in conservation biology. The essence of her reasoning is that unlimited population growth and man's unregulated exploitation of natural resources form a serious threat to the environment. Her publications have been a significant source of inspiration to the Club of Rome.

She co-founded the center for Conservation Biology at Stanford University with Paul Ehrlich, where she serves as policy coordinator after being an associate director from 1987 on. She served as one of seven outside consultants to the White House Council on Environmental Quality's Global 2000 Report (1980).

She is a senior research scientist emeritus in conservation biology in the Department of Biology at Stanford University.

== Career ==
From 1952 to 1955, Anne Ehrlich attended the University of Kansas and performed scientific research on population biology, publishing numerous scientific articles. She began her scientific collaboration with Paul Ehrlich in the late 1950s through research on butterflies as a test system for answering key questions of biological classification, ecology, and evolution.

Since 1987, Anne Ehrlich has worked as associate director and policy coordinator of the Center for Conservation Biology at Stanford University.

In 1994, she received the United Nations Sasakawa Environment Prize with Paul Ehrlich, and in 1995 they received the 1st Annual Heinz Award in the Environment.

In 1994 and 1995, she served on a task group for academics and scientists for the President's Commission on Sustainable Development.

She has served on the boards of a wide range of organizations: Friends of the Earth (1976–1985), Conferences on the Fate of the Earth (1981–1984), the Center for Innovative Diplomacy (1981–1992), Redefining Progress (1994–1996), the Ploughshares Fund (1990–2003) and the Sierra Club (1996–2002). She chaired the Sierra Club's Committee on Military Impacts on the Environment from 1985 to 1994. Until 2003, she sat on the board of advisors for the Federation for American Immigration Reform.

For ten years she was a member of the board of directors at the Center for Innovative Diplomacy, Pacific Institute, Rocky Mountain Biological Laboratory (1989–1999). As of 1988 she served on the board of the Pacific Institute for Studies in Environment, Development, and Security and as of 2002 of the New-Land Foundation.

Ehrlich is involved in the Millennium Assessment of Human Behavior (MAHB), which she co-founded with husband Paul and Professor Donald Kennedy.

From 1994 on, she published a series of newsletters titled "Ecofables/Ecoscience", using science to debunk myths about humans' relationship to the environment.

== Personal life ==
Ehrlich was born in Des Moines, Iowa, the daughter of Virginia Lippincott (Fitzhugh) Howland and Winston Densmore. Throughout her childhood she was fascinated by nature, preferring to be outside learning about wildflowers and geography. As a teenager, she read Our Plundered Planet by Fairfield Osborn, Columbia University professor of zoology, member of the wildlife conservation organization Boone and Crockett Club and fossil collector. She was influenced by his critique of humankind's poor stewardship of Earth and its environmental destruction by humans.

She married Paul R. Ehrlich in 1954. They remained married until his death in March 2026. The couple has one daughter, Lisa, born in 1955. The Population Bomb has been dedicated to Lisa, and The Population Explosion to their grandchildren.

== Writings ==
=== The Population Bomb (1968) ===
The phrase "population bomb" was first used in a 1958 pamphlet by advertising professional and entrepreneur Hugh Moore. The original edition of The Population Bomb began with this statement:

"The battle to feed all of humanity is over. In the 1970s hundreds of millions of people will starve to death in spite of any crash programs embarked upon now. At this late date nothing can prevent a substantial increase in the world death rate ..."

The Ehrlichs argued that the human population was too great, and that while the extent of disaster could be mitigated, humanity could not prevent severe famines, the spread of disease, social unrest, and other negative consequences of overpopulation. Among these issues, Ehrlich and her husband expressed many concerns about deforestation and irrigation issues.

By the end of the 1970s, this prediction and many others throughout the text proved to be wildly incorrect. However, they continued to argue that societies must take strong action to decrease population growth in order to mitigate future disasters, both ecological and social. A 2012 retrospective in the peer-reviewed journal Demography noted that many of the book's predictions did not materialize, as global food production kept pace with population growth and poverty rates declined in much of the world.

=== The Population Explosion (1990) ===
In their sequel to The Population Bomb, the Ehrlichs purport to describe how the world's growing population dwarfs the Earth's capacity to sustain current living standards and why overpopulation is the number one environmental problem. The book calls for action to confront population growth and the ensuing crisis:

"When is an area overpopulated? When its population can't be maintained without rapidly depleting nonrenewable resources (or converting renewable resources into nonrenewable ones) and without degrading the capacity of the environment to support the population. In short, if the long-term carrying capacity of an area is clearly being degraded by its current human occupants, that area is overpopulated."

While the Ehrlichs concede that consumption and technology must also share the blame for environmental crises, priority should be given to achieving population control as a means of stopping further destruction. "Rapid population growth in poor nations is an important reason they stay poor, and overpopulation in those nations will greatly increase their destructive impact on the environment as they struggle to develop,".

=== Why Isn't Everyone as Scared as We Are? (1993) ===
This opening chapter of the book Valuing the Earth: Economics, Ecology, Ehtics is co-written by Anne H. Ehrlich and her husband, Paul R. Ehrlich, and relays the Earth's "population problem." The Ehrlichs warn about the rate at which the human population has grown and how it will grow. The problems that the Earth faces due to growing population include 'global warming' and the problems associated with the harm to the Earth caused by overpopulation."

=== Optimum Human Population Size (1994) ===
In this paper, the Ehrlichs, along with Gretchen C. Daily of the University of California Berkeley, discuss their opinion on the 'optimal size' for human population, given current technological realities. They argue that an optimal human population size is one that can meet the basic necessities of the population, including access to health care, education, economic advancement, and housing. They refer to establishing "social policies to influence fertility rates."

=== The Stork and the Plow (1995) ===
A book about how poverty forces unsustainable use of natural resources, with proposals on how food production might stay ahead of population growth, together with Gretchen C. Daily. The authors look at the interaction between population and food supply and offer a strategy for balancing human numbers with nutritional needs. Their proposals include improving the status of women by giving them equal education, reducing racism and religious prejudice, reforming the agricultural system, and shrinking the growing gap between rich and poor.

This generation faces a set of challenges unprecedented in their scope and severity and in the shortness of time left to resolve them. . . . The Stork and the Plow sets these out thoughtfully [and] accurately. . . . We can all hope this urgent message is carefully heeded.

— Henry W. Kendall, Nobel laureate and Julius A. Stratton Professor of Physics, MIT

=== One With Nineveh (2005) ===
The title refers to Rudyard Kipling's 1897 poem "Recessional", "Lo, all our pomp of yesterday / Is one with Nineveh and Tyre!", alluding to the arrogance that went before the fall of historic Mesopotamian civilizations. Named a Notable Book for 2005 by the American Library Association, Ehrlich offers a lucid synthesis of the major issues of our time: rising consumption, still-growing world population, and unchecked political and economic inequity. Grounded in science, economics, and history, she puts political and environmental debates in a larger context and formulates a range of possible solutions for improving our future prospects, from local actions to reform of national government to international initiatives.

=== The Dominant Animal (2008) ===
In The Dominant Animal, Paul and Anne Ehrlich examine the trajectory of human evolution, tracing the development from early foraging to a modern, technologically advanced society that influences global ecosystems. They analyze how this dominant status affects the planet and, in turn, human welfare. The book addresses the potential risks to the species resulting from this environmental impact and offers perspectives on altering this trajectory.

=== Can a collapse of global civilization be avoided? (2013) ===
This report reminds readers of how the collapse of numerous civilizations has, in the past, been caused by the degradation of nature, and discusses how that process in present times makes a global collapse appear likely. Overpopulation, overconsumption by the rich, and poor choices of technologies are asserted as major drivers; dramatic cultural change provides the main hope of averting calamity.

== Awards and honors ==
- Raymond B. Bragg Award for Distinguished Service, Honorary Life Member 1985
- Honorary Fellow of the California Academy of Sciences, 1988
- Named to Global 500 Roll of Honour for Environmental Achievement, United Nations, 1989
- Honorary Degree Doctor of Law, Bethany College, 1990
- The United Nations Sasakawa Environment Prize (jointly with Paul R. Ehrlich and shared with M.S. Swaminathan), 1994
- The 1st Annual Heinz Award in the Environment (with Paul Ehrlich), 1995
- Nuclear Age Peace Award (with Paul Ehrlich) honored by the Nuclear Age Peace Foundation of Santa Barbara, California (1996).The awards were presented to them by ocean environmentalist Jean-Michel Cousteau.
- 1998 Tyler Prize for Environmental Achievement (with Paul Ehrlich) - The Prize has been awarded for exemplary scientific contributions to understanding the environmental consequences of species extinction, habitat destruction, and nuclear war, individually and jointly, and for raising public awareness of and shaping public opinion on resource depletion and environmental degradation. "They were among the first to effectively communicate how to apply science to the solution of society's problems,"
- Fellow of the American Academy Arts & Sciences, California Academy of Sciences (honorary)
- Honorary Doctorate of Oregon State University, 1999

== Bibliography ==
Selected works, jointly authored with colleague and husband Paul Ehrlich:

- The Population Bomb: Population Control or Race to Oblivion? (1968), New York: Ballantine Books
- Population, Resources, Environment: Issues in Human Ecology Second Edition (1972) San Francisco: WH Freeman and Company
- Human Ecology: Problems and Solutions (1973) San Francisco: WH Freeman and Company
- Ecoscience: Population, Resources, Environment" (1978), with John Holdren, San Francisco: WH Freeman and Company
- Extinction: The Causes and Consequences of the Disappearance of Species (1981), New York: Random House
- Earth (1987), New York: Franklin Watts
- The Population Explosion (1990), Simon & Schuster
- Healing the Planet: Strategies for Resolving the Environmental Crisis (1991), Addison-Wesley
- The Stork and The Plow: The Equity Answer to the Human Dilemma (1995) with Gretchen C. Daily, G.P. Putnam's Sons; New Haven, London: Yale University Press
- Betrayal of Science and Reason: How Anti-Environment Rhetoric Threatens Our Future (1998), Washington: Island Press
- One With Nineveh: Politics, Consumption, and the Human Future (2004), Washington: Island Press
- The Dominant Animal: Human Evolution and the Environment (2008), Washington: Island Press
- Can a collapse of global civilization be avoided? A Royal Society Report (2013), London
- The Annihilation of Nature: Human Extinction of Birds and Mammals (2015), with Gerardo Ceballos
- Returning to "Normal"? Evolutionary Roots of the Human Prospect (2022, paper), Millennium Alliance for Humanity and the Biosphere

== See also ==
- Paul R. Ehrlich
- Ecosystem valuation
