= Andrew Beattie =

Andrew Beattie may refer to:

- Sir Andrew Beattie (politician) (1860–1923), Irish Unionist politician
- Andy Beattie (1913–1983), Scottish footballer
- Andy Beattie (rugby union) (born 1978), English rugby union player
- Andrew Beattie (biologist), Australian biologist and co-author of Wild Solutions
