= Samuel W. Anderson =

American businessman

Samuel Wagner Anderson
- Born: 1898; La Crosse, Wisconsin
- Died: 1962 (aged 63–64)
- Education: BA, Williams College; MBA, Harvard School of Business
- Occupation: Assistant Secretary of Commerce for International Affairs
- Years active: 1953-1955

Samuel Wagner Anderson (1898–1962) was an American businessman who served as assistant secretary of commerce for international affairs under U.S. president Dwight D. Eisenhower from 1953 to 1955.

== Early life and education ==
Anderson was born and raised in LaCrosse, Wisconsin. He graduated cum laude from Williams College, where he was also a member of Phi Beta Kappa, and then graduated with distinction from the Harvard School of Business. Anderson became a clerk at Goldman Sachs in 1922, and within ten years had become vice president and a general partner.

== Career ==
Anderson moved back and forth between business and government service several times. He was a partner at the investment banking firm Goldman Sachs in 1941, when he was asked to work for the War Production Board, directing the aluminum and magnesium expansion program. After World War II, he returned to investment banking, this time at Lehman Brothers, but in 1948 went back to Washington to serve on the Economic Cooperation Administration, which administered the Marshall Plan. In 1949, Anderson began working for the International Bank for Reconstruction and Development, where he was in charge of Latin American affairs. He then worked in the Defense Production Administration, overseeing aluminum.

Anderson became Assistant Secretary of Commerce for International Affairs when President Eisenhower took office in 1953. In this position, he called for the liberalization of international trade to meet "the necessity of giving our friends abroad the opportunity to earn their way by selling more to us." Anderson resigned in 1955 to return to business, citing a "desire to rebuild his personal finances." After leaving government, Anderson became an honorary fund-raising chair of the Planned Parenthood Federation of America, and began speaking publicly about the need to stem rapid population growth, both in the United States and overseas. He also served on the board of trustees of the Population Reference Bureau.

== Personal life ==
Anderson married Lorraine Annette Combs in 1926. They had two children, Mary Lorraine and Michael Mons.
