= Netherlands fallacy =

The Netherlands fallacy refers to an error Paul R. Ehrlich and his co-authors claim others make in assuming that the environmental impacts of the Netherlands and other rich nations are contained within their national borders.

Environmentalists since the late 20th century have analyzed the environmental sink status and sink capacities of poor nations. As polluting industries migrate from rich to poor nations, the national ecological footprint of rich nations shrinks, whereas the international ecological footprint may increase or also decrease. The nature of the fallacy is to ignore increasing environmental damage in many developing nations and in international waters attributable to the imported goods or changes in the economy of such nations directly due to developed nations.

Such an approach may lead to incorrect assertions such as the environmental impact of a particular developed country is reducing, when a holistic, international approach suggests the opposite. This may in turn support over-optimistic predictions toward the improvement of global environmental conditions.

The Netherlands has had a huge impact regarding leaving water footprints across the world. They have made this footprint by importing water from other countries, leaving increasingly scarce regions. Water footprints of a country can come from either water resources used internally or resources that are outsourced. Dutch consumers have left most of their water footprint through agricultural goods and industrial goods.

== See also ==
- Environmental racism
- Externality
- Global environmental inequality
