= Millennium Alliance for Humanity and the Biosphere =

Millennium Alliance for Humanity and the Biosphere is an organization originated at Stanford University which focuses on the creation of a new paradigm by the use of foresight intelligence to systematically examine likely and possible futures so as to determine what behavioral and institutional changes are necessary to ensure a sustainable and equitable future for all.

Strategically, MAHB is aiming to bridge the gap between scientific knowledge and policy action so as to alter public perception of these issues as well as to understand why desperate conservation needs are barely responded to.

== Process ==
Emphasis is focused upon population growth and increasing consumption by the already well off as well as economic, racial and gender inequality. It aims to bring together civil society groups and related organizations to build networks, share information and act together.

== History ==
At the beginning of the 21st century when the MAHB was born, it was known as the Millennium Assessment of Human Behavior, making the point that it was following the Millennium Ecosystem Assessment (MEA) but focusing on human behavior and collective actions leading to global collapse. But that name led to considerable confusion, especially because another global behavioral assessment was underway, and because MAHB activities range from research related to how behavioral, cultural, and institutional change toward a sustainable path can be accomplished to generating fora to discuss and illuminate that path.

Thus it was decided to retain the well-known acronym and re-focus the name to a more accurate description: the Millennium Alliance for Humanity and the Biosphere.

In April 2014 a chapter detailing the MAHB's scientific approach and research agenda for sustainability was included in the book Understanding Society and Natural Resources. The chapter was co-authored by Ilan Kelman, Eugene A. Rosa, Tom R. Burns, Paul Ehrlich, Joan M. Diamond, Nora Machado, Donald Kennedy, and Lennart Olsson.
