= Elmer Pendell =

American eugenicist and sociologist

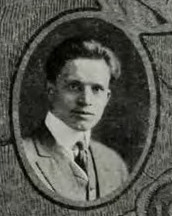
Elmer Pendell, c. 1917

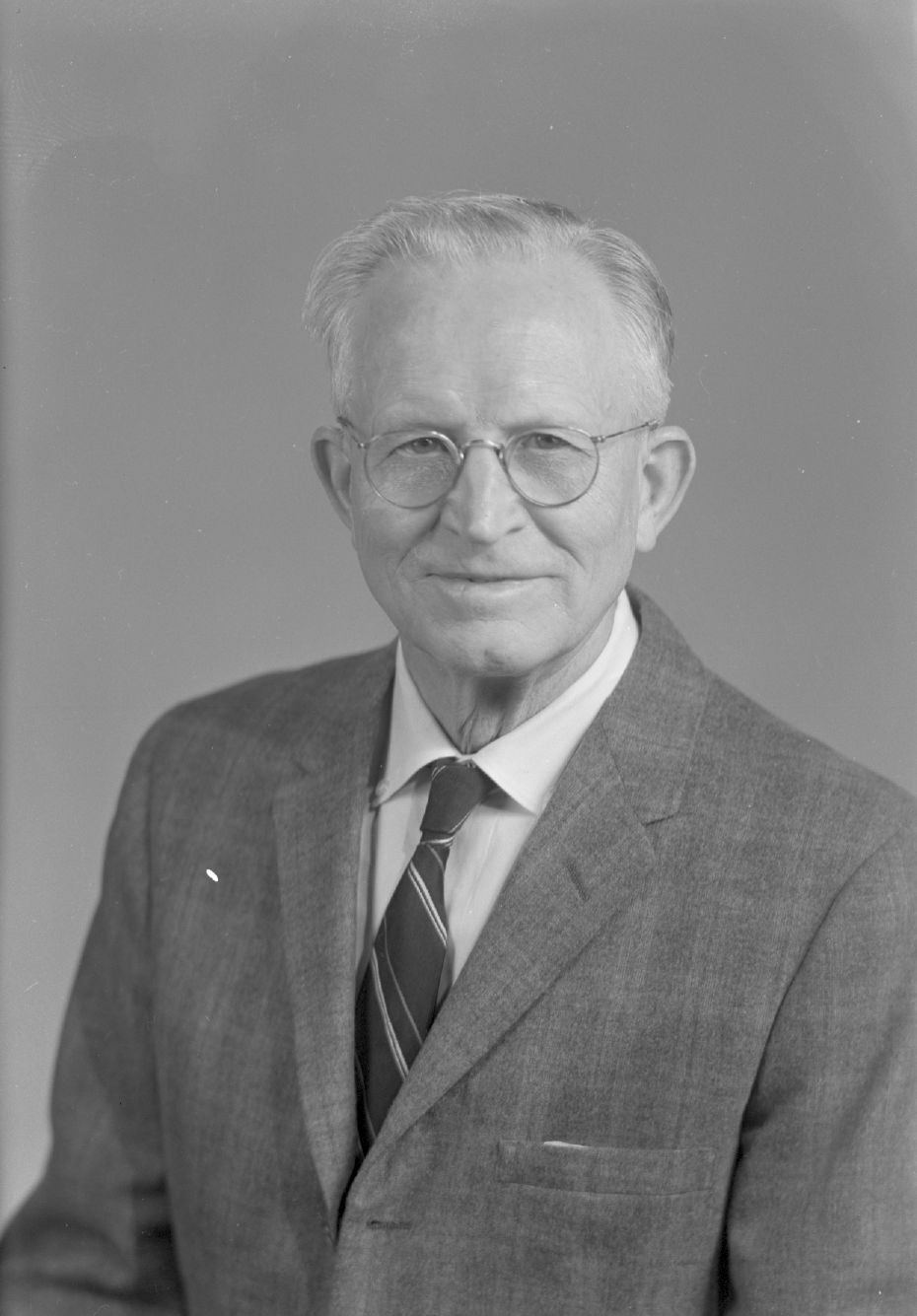
Elmer Pendell c. 1964

Elmer Pendell (July 28, 1894 – March 18, 1982) was an American eugenicist and sociologist.

== Early life ==
Pendell was born in Waverly, New York to George and Ida Harris PenDell. Pendell received his B.S. from the University of Oregon; M.A. from the University of Chicago; PhD from Cornell University; L.L.B. from George Washington University.

Pendell was a first lieutenant in the infantry in first World War where he was awarded the Distinguished Service Cross and the Purple Heart. Pendell was an economic analyst for the Republican National Committee in 1944. He was then a researcher for Colorado Senator Eugene Milliken.

Pendell taught as a professor of economics at Cornell, Baldwin-Wallace College, Olivet College, Pennsylvania State, University of Arkansas, Oklahoma A&M, Jacksonville State College. Pendell ended his teaching career at Jacksonville State College, retiring in 1965 after teaching there since 1957.

Pendell was a Republican Party candidate for the Alabama House of Representatives in 1966, losing to incumbent Rep. Hugh Merrill, an ally of Governor George Wallace.

== Writing ==
Ashley Montagu, reviewing Pendell's edited volume Society under Analysis (1942), wrote that "none of the authors contributing to the present volume shows any but the merest tangential acquaintance with the physical sciences with which they deal".

Reviewing Pendell's 1945 book Population Roads to Peace or War, co-authored with Guy Irving Burch, Paul H. Landis wrote that "[s]ociologists will … classify it as propaganda rather than an objective scientific statement". The work argued that democracy would be imperilled if population growth did not slow. A 1947 follow-up to the work, similarly titled Human Breeding and Survival: Population Roads to Peace or War, advocated population limitation as a means of reducing social problems such as hunger.

Pendell was the author of seven books on economics. Pendell was buried at Arlington National Cemetery.

== Works ==
- Pendell, Elmer (1942). Society under Analysis: An Introduction to Sociology. Lancaster, Pennsylvania: James McKeen Cattell. OCLC 906124785.
- Burch, Guy Irving; Pendell, Elmer (1947). Human Breeding and Survival. Penguin Books. OCLC 1057063191.
- Pendell, Elmer (1960). The Next Civilization. Dallas: Royal Pub. Co. ISBN 978-1258346911.
- Pendell, Elmer (1967). Sex Versus Civilization. Noontide Press. OCLC 596951.
- Pendell, Elmer (1979) [1951]. Population on the Loose. New York: Wilfred J. Funk. OCLC 6817979.
- Burch, Guy Irving; Pendell, Elmer (1947). Population Roads to Peace or War. New York: Penguin Books; Population Reference Bureau. OCLC 184166.
- Pendell, Elmer (1977). Why Civilizations Self-Destruct. Noontide Press. ISBN 9780914576075.
