= Wild Solutions =

2001 book by Andrew Beattie and Paul R. Ehrlich

- Authors: Andrew Beattie; Paul R. Ehrlich
- Publication date: 2001
- Media type: Print

Wild Solutions: How Biodiversity is Money in the Bank is a 2001 book by biologists Andrew Beattie and Paul R. Ehrlich. The authors explain the value of "wild solutions" to technical and medical problems that may reside in the diversity of the Earth's estimated 5 to 10 million species. Beattie and Ehrlich describe the role of natural substances in medicine, pest control, and manufacturing. The book won a National Outdoor Book Award in 2001. A second edition came out in 2004.
