= Population Action International =

International family planning advocacy organization

- Formation: 1957
- Founded: 1965 (under the name Population Crisis Committee)
- Founders: William Henry Draper Jr.; Lammot du Pont Copeland; Hugh Moore
- Type: Nonprofit, NGO
- Purpose: Reproductive health and family planning
- Headquarters: Washington, D.C.
- Location: Washington, D.C., United States
- Method: Research and advocacy
- President and CEO: Nabeeha Kazi Hutchins
- Website: pai.org

Population Action International (PAI) is an international, civil society organization that uses research and advocacy to improve global access to family planning and reproductive health care. Its mission is to "advance universal access to sexual and reproductive health and rights through advocacy, partnerships and the funding of changemakers". PAI's headquarters is in Washington, D.C.

== History ==
Former logo

Population Action International was founded in 1965 as the Population Crisis Committee by William Henry Draper Jr., Lammot du Pont Copeland and Hugh Moore. PAI's early successes include playing a role in the establishment of the Office of Population within the U.S. Agency for International Development (USAID), the establishment of the United Nations Population Fund (UNFPA) and raising funds for the International Planned Parenthood Federation (IPPF). PAI participated in the 1994 International Conference on Population and Development in Cairo. It has participated in the UN Commission on Population and Development; in 2010, former PAI president Suzanne Ehlers was a U.S. delegate to the commission.

== Profile ==
PAI promotes economic development, health and environmental sustainability through funding for family-planning and sexual and reproductive health services worldwide. The organization monitors the impact of U.S. policies and programs overseas, and fosters the development of United States and international policy on sexual and reproductive health and rights. Internationally, PAI provides partner organizations with financial resources and technical assistance.

PAI's research and analysis focus on key issues in reproductive-health policy: improving access to reproductive health care, funding, and mobilizing political will to support family planning. It has conducted demographic research on women's empowerment, political and economic stability and governance. PAI tracks funding for family planning and reproductive-health services in global majority countries. PAI's advocacy involves mobilizing political and financial support for family planning programs and sexual and reproductive health and rights.

In the United States, PAI works with domestic policymakers to strengthen U.S. reproductive-health policies and funding for programs.

== Leadership ==
In 2021, Nabeeha Kazi Hutchins became President & CEO of PAI. Past presidents of PAI include Suzanne Ehlers (2010-2019), Amy Coen (1997–2010), Hugo Hoogenboom (1995–1997) and J. Joseph Speidel (1987–1995). Under Speidel, PAI nearly doubled its staff and budget, increased media exposure in the U.S. and abroad, and began to train and sustain overseas advocacy groups. He also led PAI's team during the 1994 International Conference on Population and Development (ICPD) in Cairo. During Coen's tenure, PAI worked to move U.S. policy to fortify the reproductive-health advocacy movement in other countries and the links between population and reproductive health and global issues such as climate change.

== Issues and campaigns ==
- Access to reproductive-health supplies
- Development and security
- Family planning
- HIV and AIDS
- Sexual and reproductive health policy funding by the United States and internationally
- Sexual violence

== Initiatives ==
=== Reproductive-health supplies ===
To meet the growing need for reproductive-health supplies, PAI joined the Interim Working Group (IWG) on Reproductive Health Commodity Security in 2001 with partners John Snow, Inc. (JSI), the Program for Appropriate Technology and Health (PATH) and the Wallace Global Fund. The coalition met in Istanbul, Turkey, in 2001 and devised a "Call to Action" plan with the goals of raising awareness, increasing support and proposing solutions to the crisis in reproductive health (RH) supplies in two phases (a supply initiative and a project Resources Mobilization Awareness:

- The supply-initiative phase resulted in an increase in media coverage of the RH supplies issue, increased availability of advocacy resources and materials, improved participation and investment by key stakeholders and partners and increased numbers of donor governments contributing to RH supplies and increased volume of funding.
- Project RMA focuses on specific countries and regional bodies to create a tangible financial and political commitment to sustained availability of RH supplies in developing countries. Project RMA's partners include PAI, the International Planned Parenthood Foundation and the German Foundation for World Population.

=== Youth ===
PAI's youth initiative works to highlight the sexual and reproductive-health and -rights needs of young people in the U.S. and abroad through the youth-led Young People's Initiative (YPI). The YPI aims to reach diverse audiences to promote improved sexual reproductive health and rights outcomes for young people. Goals and activities of the young people's work group include funding to youth-led initiatives in developing countries and U.S university tours and documentary presentations.

== Publications and documentaries ==
PAI publishes annual reports that provide an overview of the programs, research, accomplishments, finances, and future goals that the organization has undertaken the previous fiscal year. PAI also has financed and sponsored several documentaries centering on key population issues such as gender relations, HIV/AIDS, family planning and reproductive health. They are:

- Empty Handed: Responding to the Demand for Contraceptives: Examines women's lack of access to reproductive-health supplies in sub-Saharan Africa and the impact it has on their lives. It documents the challenges at each level of the reproductive-health supply chain and identifies areas in need of improvement. Empty Handed was released at the Women Deliver Conference in Washington, D.C., on June 8, 2010.
- The Silent Partner: HIV in Marriage: Examines the risk of HIV transmission in marriage and the health and cultural challenges facing married women. The 12-minute documentary, filmed in Kenya, is intended to inform and provoke discussion of harmful gender and societal norms that put women and couples at risk for HIV. It is also intended for advocacy to mobilize political and financial support for sexual and reproductive health and rights to achieve broader social, economic and gender equity for everyone. The Silent Partner premiered in Nairobi, Kenya, on November 19, 2008.
- Abstaining from Reality: Filmed in Kenya and Uganda, the documentary provides a snapshot of the Bush administration's abstinence-only approach to HIV prevention as a requirement for its global HIV/AIDS assistance. Abstaining from Reality examines how ideologically driven programs can endanger the lives of people they ostensibly protect. The film urges a balanced, comprehensive approach to preventing HIV infections by providing full and accurate information and a range of services that empower individuals to make informed decisions. Abstaining from Reality was accepted by the 2007 United Nations Association Film Festival.
- Finding Balance—Forests and Family Planning in Madagascar: Poverty and rapid population growth have driven the destruction of almost 90 percent of Madagascar's rainforest, home to thousands of unique plant and animal species. The documentary journeys to the edge of a rapidly disappearing world, where population growth continues to fuel the cycle of poverty and deforestation. Interviews with local women reveal their desire to have fewer children and underscore the critical need for family planning services in remote areas. This short documentary brings the links between population growth and environmental destruction into focus, and explores what one local organization is doing about it.
