= Henry Fairfield Osborn Jr. =

American conservationist

- Born: 15 January 1887; Princeton, New Jersey
- Died: 16 September 1969 (aged 82); New York City
- Education: Princeton University, Cambridge University
- Known for: Environmentalism, overpopulation, conservation
- Parent: Henry Fairfield Osborn
- Relatives: William Church Osborn, uncle

Henry Fairfield Osborn Jr. (15 January 1887 – 16 September 1969), was an American conservationist. He was longtime president of the New York Zoological Society (today known as the Wildlife Conservation Society).

== Biography ==
Henry Fairfield Osborn Jr. was born in Princeton, New Jersey in 1887. Born into the wealthy and influential Osborn family, he was the son of Henry Fairfield Osborn, a prominent paleontologist, eugenicist and "distinguished Aryan enthusiast". After obtaining his Bachelor of Arts from Princeton University, he went on to study biology at Cambridge University but then pursued a career in international business. Towards the end of the First World War, he served briefly as a Captain in the United States Army, after which he returned to private enterprise.

In 1935, he retired from business and devoted himself to environmental causes, especially to the New York Zoological Society (today known as the Wildlife Conservation Society). Following his election to the Society's board in 1923, he served as its Secretary from 1935 to 1940. In 1940, he became President of the New York Zoological Society, a role he held for 28 years.

Osborn wrote Our Plundered Planet, and when published in 1948 it became very influential in the early Environmental movement and helped spur a Malthusian revival in the 1950s and 60s. He is also remembered for being an early opponent of synthetic pesticide use, for producing several films dealing with endangered species, flood control, and water resources, as well as for his second book, The Limits of the Earth (1953), and a collection of short essays he edited under the title of Our Crowded Planet (1962).

From 1948 to 1961, he served as the first president of the Conservation Foundation, an organization he founded with several like-minded colleagues to raise awareness about ecological problems. After retiring as Conservation Foundation president in 1962, he served as its Chairman until 1969. From 1950 to 1957, Osborn was also a member of the Conservation Advisory Committee for the U.S. Department of the Interior, while also serving on the Planning Committee of the Economic and Social Council of the United Nations. Upon his death in New York City on September 16, 1969, he was commemorated for his significant contributions to various conservation organizations and his proactive efforts to raise awareness about the perils of unregulated population expansion and advocate for sustainable utilization of natural resources.

== See also ==
- Fairfield Osborn Preserve
