= Population Reference Bureau =

Non-profit organization in the USA

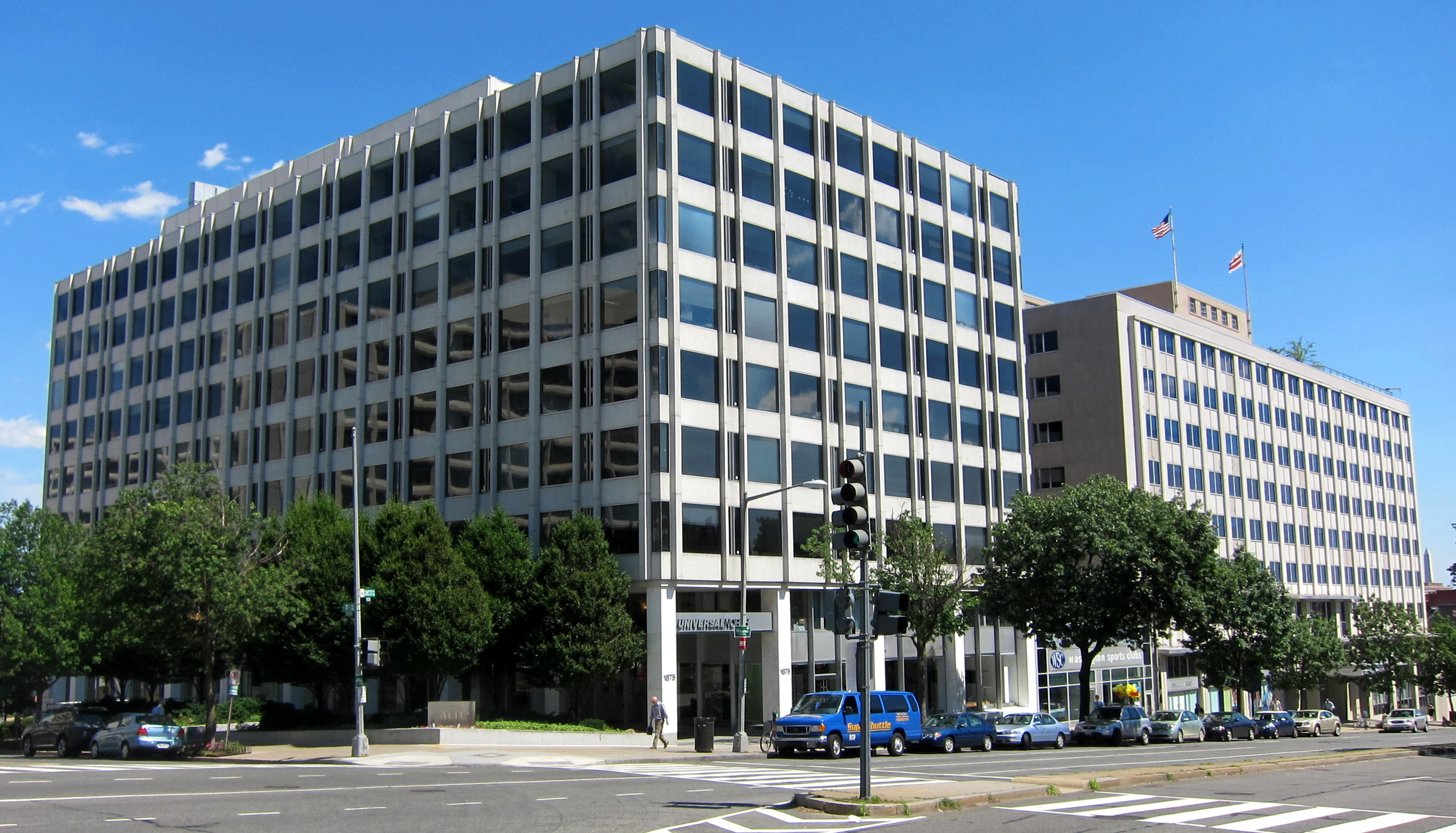
- PRB headquarters in Washington, D.C.
- Established: 1929
- Chair: Bobby Jefferson
- President/CEO: Jennifer Dabbs Sciubba
- Address: 1111 19th Street NW, #400; Washington, D.C. 20036
- Location: Washington, D.C., USA
- Website: Official Website

The Population Reference Bureau (PRB) is a private, nonprofit organization specializing in collecting and supplying statistics necessary for research and/or academic purposes focused on the environment, and health and structure of populations. The PRB works in the United States and internationally with a wide range of partners in the government, nonprofit, research, business, and philanthropy sectors.

== History ==
The Population Reference Bureau (PRB) was established in 1929 by the eugenicist Guy Irving Burch. In the early 1930s, PRB shared office space with the Population Association of America, which was created in May 1931 in New York City, but the PRB soon moved to Washington, D.C.

In 1945, the PRB began to publish the Population Bulletin, which brought current population data to the attention of the public and policy makers. The PRB received a three-year grant from the Ford Foundation in 1952. At that point, its Board of Trustees included the biologist C.C. Little, Assistant Secretary of Commerce Samuel W. Anderson, and the demographer Kingsley Davis. Robert C. Cook took over as director after Burch's death in 1951.

== Funding and partners ==
The PRB receives support from a number of foundations, non-governmental organizations, and government agencies. Examples of such funding include the Annie E. Casey Foundation, the Johns Hopkins Bloomberg School of Public Health, the United States Census Bureau, and the World Health Organization.

The PRB partners with about 80 other organizations all around the world, in countries like Sudan, Egypt, and Uganda, to name a few. These partners vary in foci and location, ranging from renowned research institutions such as the International Center for Research on Women to public education institutions such as the University of South Florida.

== Capabilities ==
The Population Reference Bureau has many capabilities in providing information to individuals all around the world regarding population, health, and the environment. The organization specializes in the translation of the population demographics and health research, the analysis of the United States and international demographics, social and economic trends, and expanding the platform for general database research.

== Services ==
The Population Reference Bureau offers an annual World Population Data Sheet, which is a chart containing data from 200 countries concerning important demographic and health variables, such as total population, fertility rates, infant mortality rates, HIV/AIDS prevalence, and contraceptive use.

The PRB's online data allows users to search a database of hundreds of demographic, health, economic, and environmental variables for countries and regions all around the world, such as the Middle East, Latin America, and Sub-Saharan Africa. The database provides scholarly articles about an assortment of topics, ranging from noncommunicable diseases and nutrition to the labor force and family planning.

The PRB also publishes a Population Bulletins, information about demographic concepts to help in educating the public on population studies.

Among these, other data and population tools available to the public from the PRB include population bulletins and customizable training and educational materials, presented through visual, written and online publications.

== Programs and projects ==
The method used by the Population Reference Bureau involves focusing on educating people within the project areas, and then utilizing them to make changes within populations.

The Population Reference Bureau has both past and current programs and service projects around the globe, mainly focused in the United States, and parts of the developing world including Sub-Saharan Africa and the Middle East. Projects in the United States vary from analyses of demographic and economic data, projects aiding collecting data for the American Community Survey, and studying factors of aging and factors of health in children. International projects focus on learning about health and disease for at risk populations, family planning and reproductive health, and further using this learned knowledge to establish programs to improve communities. Current projects of the Population Reference Bureau include; Demographic and Socioeconomic Trends in the Appalachian region of the United States, Combatting Noncommunicable Disease Risk Factors in Youth across Latin America and the Caribbean, North Africa and the Middle East, Asia, and Africa, and their current featured project; Evidence to End Female Genital Mutilation/Cutting across the globe.

== See also ==
- Population Association of America
- Institut national d'études démographiques
- Max Planck Institute for Demographic Research
- List of population concern organizations
