= Road to Survival =

Book by William Vogt

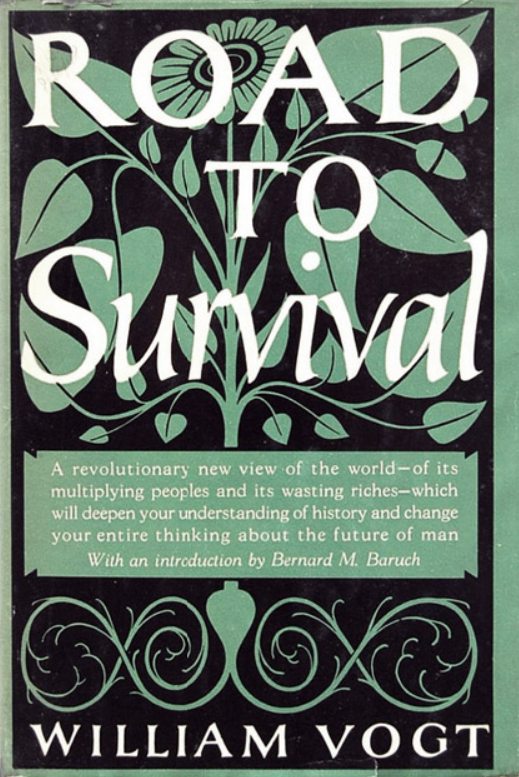
- Author: William Vogt
- Publication date: August 5, 1948
- Publication place: United States
- ISBN: 0548385165

Road to Survival is a 1948 book by William Vogt. It was a major inspiration for a certain strand of modern environmentalism as well as for the revival of Malthusianism—the so-called neo-Malthusianism—in the post-war era.

== Summary ==
Road to Survival is a summary of the ecological status of the world. Vogt documented the negative effects of an expanding global population on the environment. He gathered reports of deforestation, gullying, overgrazing, soil erosion, and many forms of destruction of fundamental resources which he believed had arisen from the greed and ignorance of humankind.

Vogt contended that global population growth surpasses the capacity of food production to sustain it, thereby advocating for the necessity of universal birth control measures. Vogt also critiqued capitalism, characterizing it as a flawed system, and portrayed the historical trajectory of the United States as a continuous series of destructive events and actions.

The book is filled with scientific data, and its worldwide scope was unusual at the time. Ultimately, the book advocates population control as the only way to prevent environmental disaster. Human population could not exceed the planet's carrying capacity without disaster. According to Hampshire College's Betsy Hartmann, Vogt is the founder of what she calls "apocalyptic environmentalism".

== Reception ==
The book was commercially successful, with a condensed version published in the January 1949 edition of Reader's Digest. Numerous educational institutions adopted it as a primary instructional material. Nevertheless, the core message encountered criticism from various ideological groups, drawing opposition from conservatives who disapproved of its anti-capitalist stance and endorsement of birth control, while liberals perceived it as indicative of science's inadequacy in addressing contemporary societal challenges.

In a 1949 assessment published in the Geography journal, it was determined that the examination of the origins and outcomes of soil erosion across various global regions held significant merit. While acknowledging potential disagreements with the author's political and ethical stances, the thesis was regarded as a thought-provoking and stimulating contribution. This work was perceived to offer a valuable challenge, inciting contemplation on substantial and pertinent issues within the field.

Later on, the book would inspire the modern environmental movement, with both Rachel Carson and Paul Ehrlich being inspired by it.

Charles C. Mann highlighted Vogt's pivotal role in laying the foundation for the modern environmental movement. Betsy Hartmann, a population researcher at Hampshire College, characterized Vogt's groundbreaking contributions as 'apocalyptic environmentalism.' This school of thought is predicated on the belief that the human race will cause irreparable harm to Earth's ecosystems if it does not reduce its consumption and population growth. Vogt effectively communicated this message through widely acclaimed books and compelling speeches, contending that our affluence, as opposed to being a source of pride, is our most pressing challenge. "Cut back!" was his repeated mantra and is a poignant call to action, highlighting the imperative need for sustainable practices to prevent global devastation.

== See also ==
- Our Plundered Planet
