= William Vogt =

American ecologist and ornithologist (1902–1968)

- Born: 15 May 1902; Mineola, New York
- Died: 11 July 1968 (aged 66)
- Occupations: Zoologist, ornithologist and environmentalist

William Vogt (15 May 1902 – 11 July 1968) was an American ecologist and ornithologist, with a strong interest in both the carrying capacity and population control. He was the author of the best-seller Road to Survival (1948), National Director of the Planned Parenthood Federation of America and secretary of the Conservation Foundation.

== Biography ==
William Vogt was born in Mineola, New York. After graduating with honors in 1925 from St. Stephens (now Bard) College, he was, among other things, an early opponent of marshland drainage for mosquito control and later assumed a series of positions that allowed him to further pursue his interests in birds and the environment.

=== Road to Survival ===
In 1942, he was made Associate Director of the Division of Science and Education of the Office of the Coordinator of Inter-American Affairs. Later he served as Chief of the Conservation Section of the Pan American Union, through which he was allowed to study the relationship between climate, population, and resources in various Latin American countries. These experiences formed the background to the perspective he later elaborated on in his Road to Survival (1948), a book motivated by his strong belief that then-current trends in fertility and economic growth were rapidly destroying the environment and undermining the quality of life of future generations. Vogt's most significant contribution was to link environmental and perceived overpopulation problems, warning that current trends would deliver future wars, hunger, disease, and civilizational collapse.

Road to Survival was an influential best-seller. It had a big impact on a Malthusian revival in the 1950s and 60s. After its publication, he dedicated many activities to the cause of overpopulation. From 1951 to 1962, he served as a National Director of the Planned Parenthood Federation of America. In 1964, he became the Secretary of the Conservation Foundation. He served as a representative of the International Union for the Conservation of Nature and Natural Resources to the United Nations until his death by suicide on July 11, 1968.

== Legacy ==
According to Charles C. Mann, "Vogt...laid out the basic ideas for the modern environmental movement. In particular, he founded what the Hampshire College population researcher Betsy Hartmann has called 'apocalyptic environmentalism'—the belief that unless humankind drastically reduces consumption and limits population, it will ravage global ecosystems. In best-selling books and powerful speeches, Vogt argued that affluence is not our greatest achievement but our biggest problem. If we continue taking more than the Earth can give, he said, the unavoidable result will be devastation on a global scale. Cut back! Cut back! was his mantra."

== Honors ==
In 1948, he was awarded the Mary Soper Pope Memorial Award in botany. In 1960 he was elected a Fellow of the American Association for the Advancement of Science.

== General and cited sources ==
- Robertson, Thomas (2012). The Malthusian Moment: Global Population Growth and the Birth of American Environmentalism. Rutgers University Press
