= Paul R. Ehrlich =

American biologist (1932–2026)

Paul Ehrlich
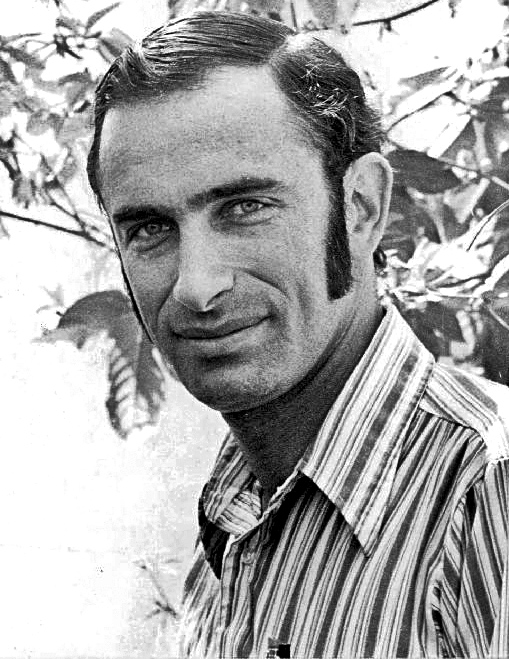
- Ehrlich in 1974
- Born: Paul Ralph Ehrlich; May 29, 1932; Philadelphia, Pennsylvania, U.S.
- Died: March 13, 2026 (aged 93); Palo Alto, California, U.S.
- Education: University of Pennsylvania (BA); University of Kansas (MA, PhD)
- Known for: The Population Bomb (1968); Simon–Ehrlich wager
- Spouse: Anne Howland (m. 1954)
- Children: 1
- Awards: Crafoord Prize (1990); Heinz Awards (1995); Tyler Prize for Environmental Achievement (1998); Fellow of the Royal Society (2012)
- Scientific career
- Fields: Entomology; Population studies
- Workplaces: Stanford University
- Thesis: The Morphology, Phylogeny and Higher Classification of the Butterflies (Lepidoptera: Papilionoidea) (1957)
- Doctoral advisor: Charles Michener

Paul Ralph Ehrlich (May 29, 1932 – March 13, 2026) was an American biologist, author, and environmentalist known for his predictions and warnings about the consequences of population growth, including famine and resource depletion. Ehrlich was the Bing Professor of Population Studies of the Department of Biology of Stanford University. He started working at Jasper Ridge Biological Preserve in 1959. He along with many other biology professors, led the efforts for Stanford University to designate and protect Jasper Ridge in 1973 as a biological preserve and as a long-term research facility for faculty and students.

Ehrlich became well known for the controversial 1968 book The Population Bomb, which he co-authored with his wife Anne H. Ehrlich, in which they famously stated that "[i]n the 1970s hundreds of millions of people will starve to death in spite of any crash programs embarked upon now." This position has led historians and critics to describe Ehrlich as a neo-Malthusian.

There are mixed views on Ehrlich's assertions on the dangers of expanding human populations. While statistician Paul A. Murtaugh says that Ehrlich was largely correct, Ehrlich has been criticized for his approach and views, both for their pessimistic outlook and for the failure of his predictions. In 2004, Ehrlich had acknowledged that population growth was in decline, but had believed that overconsumption by wealthy nations was a major problem. He maintained that his warnings about disease and climate change were essentially correct. Journalist Dan Gardner criticized Ehrlich for his cognitive dissonance in forecasting, asserting that Ehrlich took credit for his successful predictions but failed to acknowledge his mistakes.

== Early life, education and academic career ==
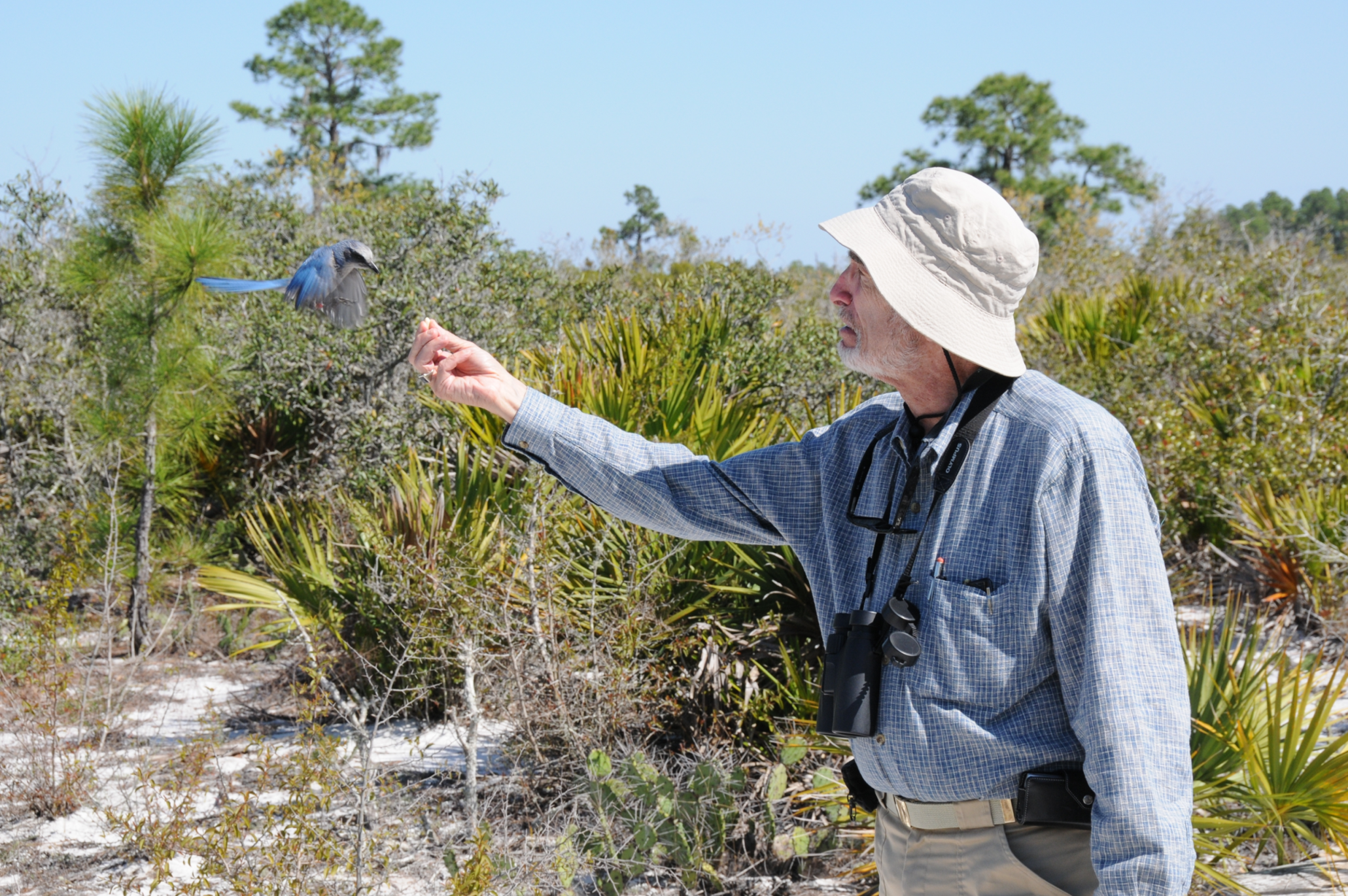
Ehrlich in 2010

Ehrlich was born in Philadelphia, Pennsylvania, the son of William Ehrlich and Ruth Rosenberg. His father was a shirt salesman and his mother was a Greek and Latin scholar and public school teacher. Ehrlich's mother's German ancestors arrived in the United States in the 1840s, and his paternal grandparents emigrated there later from the Galician and Transylvanian part of the Austrian Empire. Ehrlich has been described as having grown up in a household that was Jewish but anti-Zionist. During his childhood his family moved to Maplewood, New Jersey, where he attended Columbia High School, graduating in 1949.

By training, Ehrlich was an entomologist specializing in Lepidoptera (butterflies). He earned a bachelor's degree in zoology from the University of Pennsylvania in 1953, an M.A. from the University of Kansas in 1955, and a Ph.D. from the University of Kansas in 1957, supervised by the prominent bee researcher Charles Duncan Michener (the title of his dissertation: The Morphology, Phylogeny and Higher Classification of the Butterflies (Lepidoptera: Papilionoidea)).

During his studies he participated in surveys of insects in the areas of the Bering Sea and Canadian arctic, and then, with a National Institutes of Health fellowship, investigated the genetics and behavior of parasitic mites. In 1959 he joined the faculty at Stanford University. He became well known for popularizing the term coevolution in an influential 1964 paper co-authored with the botanist Peter H. Raven, where they proposed that reciprocal selective responses between insects and their food plants explains the extreme diversification of plants and insects.

This paper was highly influential on the then-nascent field of chemical ecology. He was promoted to professor of biology in 1966, and appointed to the Bing Professorship in 1977. In 1984, he founded the Center for Conservation Biology at Stanford University. He was a fellow of the American Association for the Advancement of Science, the United States National Academy of Sciences, the American Academy of Arts and Sciences and the American Philosophical Society.

== Overpopulation debate ==
A graph showing changes in global human population since 10,000 BC

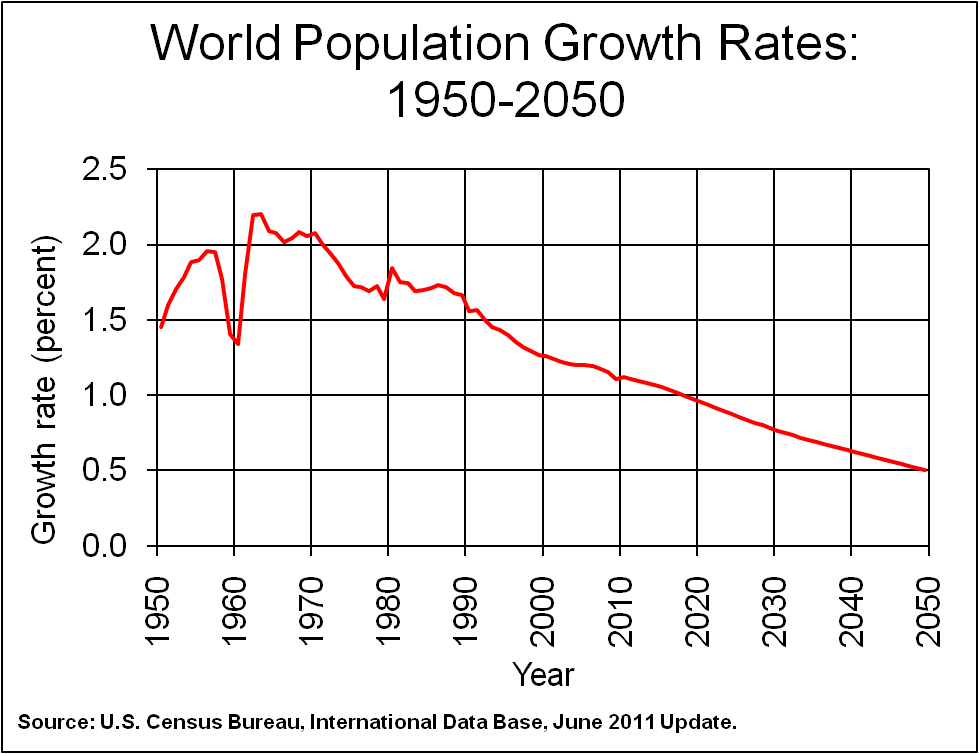
The evidence against a population bomb: Since the 1960s, the world population growth rate has decreased, and is projected to decline further.

A lecture that Ehrlich gave on the topic of overpopulation at the Commonwealth Club of California was broadcast by radio in April 1967. The success of the lecture caused further publicity, and the suggestion from David Brower the executive director of the environmentalist Sierra Club, and Ian Ballantine of Ballantine Books to write a book concerning the topic. Ehrlich and his wife, Anne H. Ehrlich, collaborated on the book, The Population Bomb, but the publisher insisted that a single author be credited; only Paul's name appears as an author.

Although Ehrlich was not the first to warn about population issues — concern had been widespread during the 1950s and 1960s — his charismatic and media-savvy methods helped publicize the topic. The Tonight Show Starring Johnny Carson had Ehrlich on as a guest more than twenty times, with one interview lasting an hour.

=== Writings ===
==== The Population Bomb (1968) ====
The original edition of The Population Bomb began with the statement:

The battle to feed all of humanity is over. In the 1970s hundreds of millions of people will starve to death in spite of any crash programs embarked upon now. At this late date nothing can prevent a substantial increase in the world death rate ...

Ehrlich argued that the human population was too great, and that while the extent of disaster could be mitigated, humanity could not prevent severe famines, the spread of disease, social unrest, and other negative consequences of overpopulation.

Ehrlich has proposed different solutions to the problem of overpopulation. In The Population Bomb he wrote, "We must have population control at home, hopefully through a system of incentives and penalties, but by compulsion if voluntary methods fail. We must use our political power to push other countries into programs which combine agricultural development and population control." Voluntary measures he has endorsed include the easiest possible availability of birth control and abortion.

Decades later, Ehrlich's continued prominence and the failure of the book's predictions to materialize led to renewed scrutiny and criticism. The New York Times said his "apocalyptic predictions fell as flat as ancient theories about the shape of the Earth".

Science author Charles C. Mann wrote that the book's predictions "fueled an anti-population-growth crusade that led to human rights abuses around the world", including coercive population control policies and even forced sterilizations. Ehrlich's pointed criticism of India in particular (for instance, emphasizing the overpopulation of Delhi rather than Paris, which had nearly triple Delhi's population at the time of writing) has been criticized for focusing much more on "feelings" than on actual data.

Neither of the Ehrlichs have ever publicly renounced predictions, instead insisting that they were largely correct, despite the errors noted by many experts.

==== The Population Explosion (1990) ====
The Population Explosion argues that the population catastrophe outlined in the Ehrlichs' earlier work The Population Bomb had in fact come to pass, and that "hunger is rife and famine and plague ever more imminent".

Many accepted the premise of a looming population problem; for instance the sociologist Frank Bean wrote in a review of the book for the New York Times that "it is not merely prudent but imperative that we confront population issues, and do so now". Others, like the sociologist Thomas J. Espenshade, criticized the Ehrlichs for an "alarmist" tone. The book was also criticised for its approach to family planning, which argued voluntary family planning was insufficient to deal with population growth and government-directed population control was necessary. The Ehrlichs were accused of advocating the curtailment of reproductive freedoms and giving the state a larger role in such decisions, while leaving ambiguous "just how authoritarian a solution they are willing to endorse."

Subsequent attention to the book scrutinized its descriptions of an unfolding overpopulation catastrophe. The book's contention that global food production had already peaked proved to be incorrect. Similarly, the prediction that India faced catastrophic food shortage in the 1990s failed to materialize.

==== Optimum Human Population Size (1994) ====
In this paper, the Ehrlichs discussed their opinion on the 'optimal size' for human population, given their assessment of the current technological situation. Their "back-of-the-envelope" estimate was that the optimal human population, given "prevailing biophysical and social conditions" and satisfying certain criteria, is "in the vicinity of 1.5 to 2 billion people". They referred to establishing "social policies to influence fertility rates."

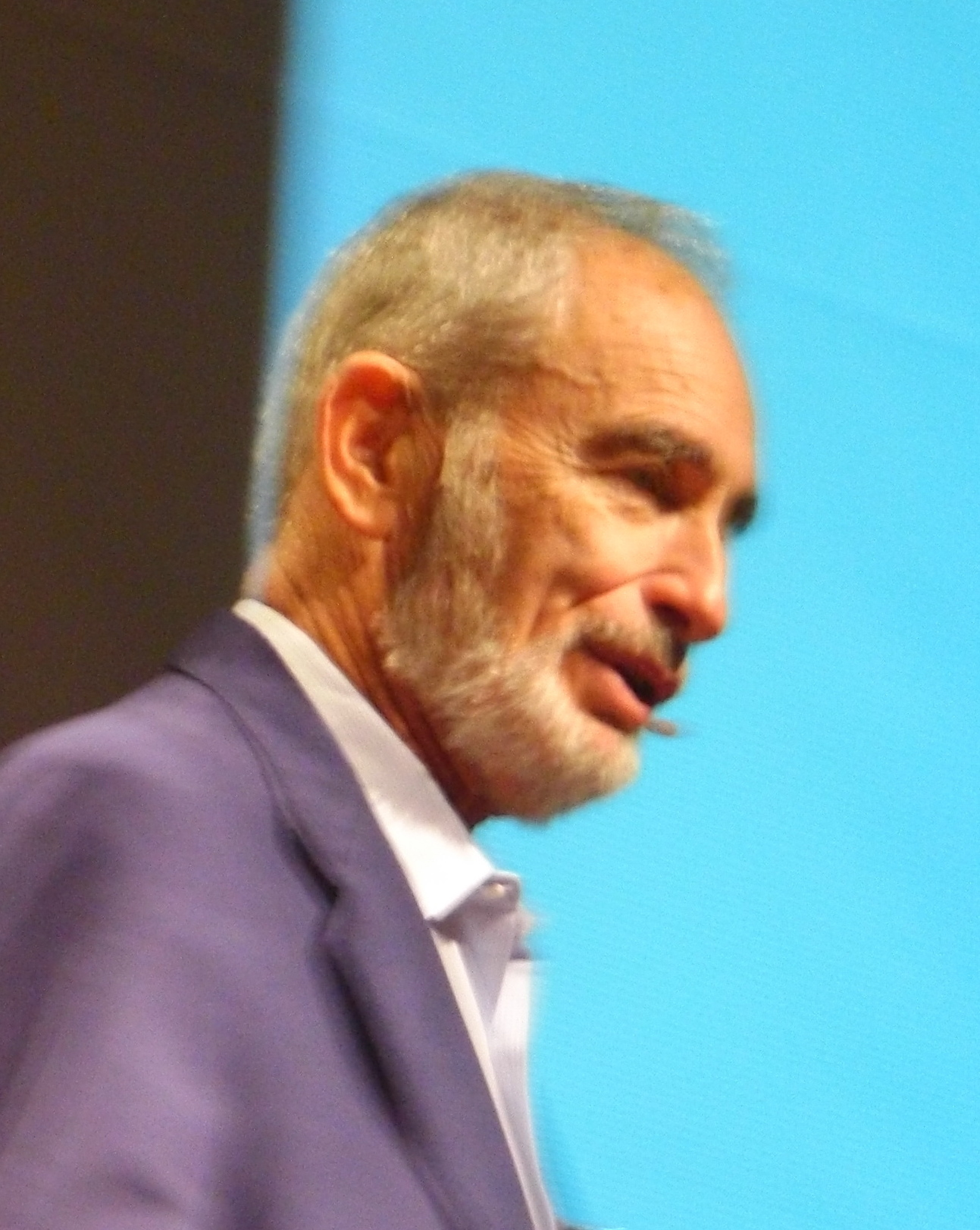
Ehrlich speaking in 2008

=== After 2000 ===
During a 2004 interview, Ehrlich answered questions about the predictions he made in The Population Bomb. He acknowledged that some of what he had published had not occurred, but stated that he felt "little embarrassment" and reaffirmed his basic opinion that overpopulation is a major problem. He noted that, "Fifty-eight academies of science said that same thing in 1994, as did the world scientists' warning to humanity in the same year. My view has become depressingly mainline!" Ehrlich asserted that 600 million people were very hungry while billions were under-nourished, and insisted that his predictions about disease and climate change were essentially correct. Retrospectively, Ehrlich said that The Population Bomb, which predicted a widespread famine by 1985 that never materialized, was actually "way too optimistic".

In a 2008 discussion hosted by the website Salon, Paul Ehrlich was more critical of the United States specifically, claiming that it should control its population and consumption as an example to the rest of the world. He still professed a belief that governments should discourage people from having more than two children, suggesting, for example, a higher tax rate for larger families.

In 2011, as the world's population passed the seven billion mark, Ehrlich argued that the next two billion people on Earth would cause more damage than the previous two billion, as humans now increasingly would have to resort to using more marginal and environmentally damaging resources. As of 2013, Ehrlich continued to perform policy research concerning population and resource issues, with an emphasis upon endangered species, cultural evolution, environmental ethics, and the preservation of genetic resources. Along with Dr. Gretchen Daily, he performed work in countryside biogeography; that is, the study of making human-disturbed areas hospitable to biodiversity. His research group at Stanford University examined extensive natural populations of the Bay checkerspot butterfly (Euphydryas editha bayensis).

The population-related disaster that Ehrlich predicted has failed to materialize, including the "hundreds of millions" of starvation deaths in the 1970s and the tens of millions of deaths in the United States in the 1970s and 1980s. Slowing of population growth rates and new food production technologies have increased the food supply faster than the population. Ehrlich continued to stand by his general thesis that the human population is too large, posing a direct threat to human survival and the environment of the planet. In 2015, he stated that if he were to write the book then, "My language would be even more apocalyptic today." In 2018, he emphasized his view that the optimum population size is between 1.5 and 2 billion people. In 2022, he was a contributor to the "Scientists' warning on population", published by Science of the Total Environment, which estimated that a sustainable population would be between 2 and 4 billion people.

== Reception ==
=== Responses to predictions ===
During the 1960s and 70s when Ehrlich made his most alarming warnings, there was a widespread belief among experts that population growth presented an extremely serious threat to the future of human civilization, although differences existed regarding the severity of the situation, and how to decrease it.

In the decades since, critics have disputed Ehrlich's main thesis about overpopulation and its effects on the environment and human society, and his solutions, as well as his specific predictions made since the late 1960s.

Wheat yields grew rapidly in Least Developed Countries since 1961.

A common criticism is that Ehrlich's predictions routinely failed to come true; for instance, Ronald Bailey of Reason magazine has termed him an "irrepressible doomster ... who, as far as I can tell, has never been right in any of his forecasts of imminent catastrophe." On the first Earth Day in 1970, he warned that "[i]n ten years all important animal life in the sea will be extinct. Large areas of coastline will have to be evacuated because of the stench of dead fish."

In a 1971 speech, he predicted that: "By the year 2000 the United Kingdom will be simply a small group of impoverished islands, inhabited by some 70 million hungry people." "If I were a gambler," Professor Ehrlich concluded before boarding an airplane, "I would take even money that England will not exist in the year 2000."

When this scenario did not occur, he responded that "When you predict the future, you get things wrong. How wrong is another question. I would have lost if I had had taken the bet. However, if you look closely at England, what can I tell you? They're having all kinds of problems, just like everybody else."

Ehrlich wrote in The Population Bomb that, "India couldn't possibly feed two hundred million more people by 1980." In 1967, Ehrlich called to cut off emergency food aid to India as "hopeless". This position was later criticized, as India's food production subsequently skyrocketed through the Green Revolution in India, and its per capita caloric intake rose significantly in the following decades, even as its population doubled.

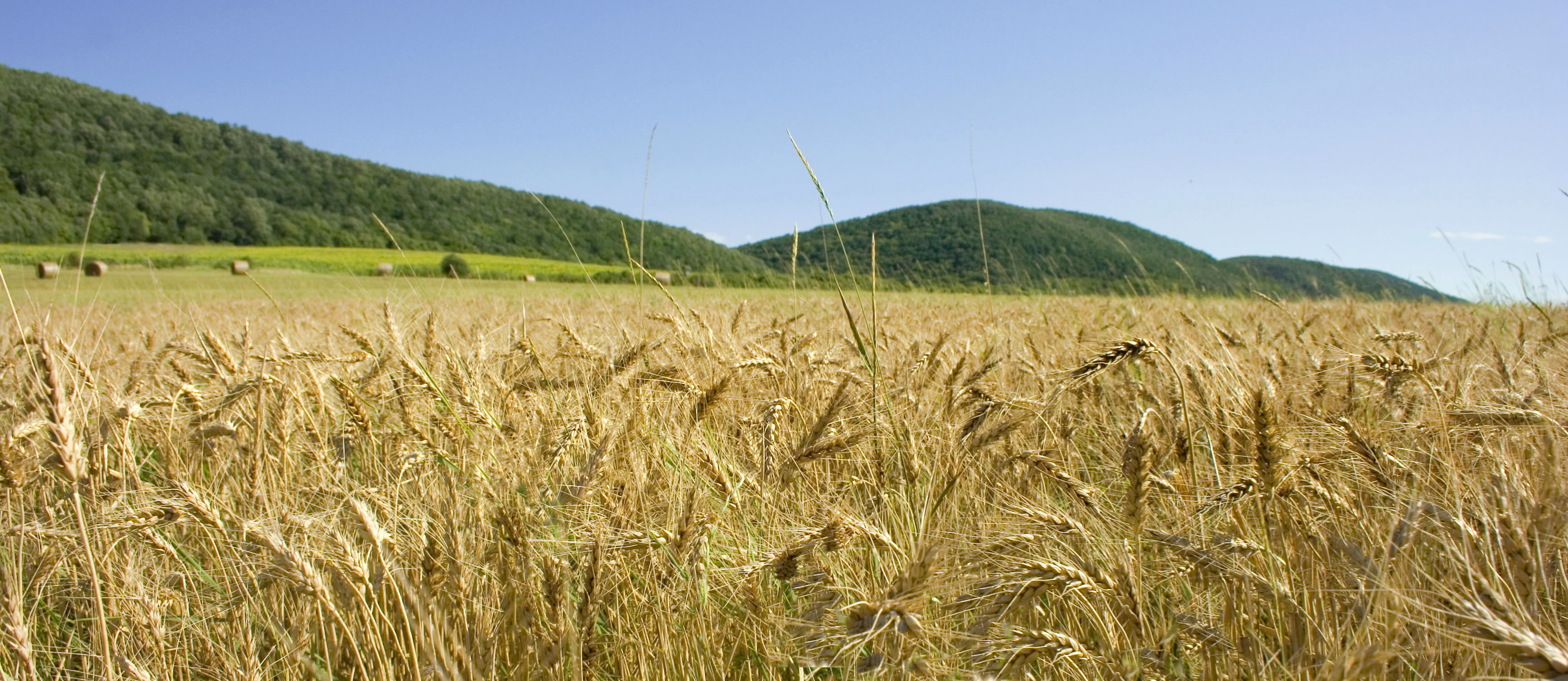
A large increase in global food production since the 1960s and a slowing of population growth have, within the current context of continued depletion of non-renewable resources, averted the scale of food shortage, famine and catastrophe foretold by the Ehrlichs.

Canadian journalist Dan Gardner, in his 2010 book Future Babble, argues that Ehrlich has been insufficiently forthright in acknowledging errors he made, while being intellectually dishonest or evasive in taking credit for things he claims he got "right". For example, he rarely acknowledges the mistakes he made in predicting material shortages, massive death tolls from starvation (as many as one billion in the publication Age of Affluence) or regarding the disastrous effects on specific countries. Meanwhile, he is happy to claim credit for "predicting" the increase of AIDS or global warming.

In the case of disease, Ehrlich had predicted the increase of a disease based on overcrowding, or the weakened immune systems of starving people, so it is "a stretch to see this as forecasting the emergence of AIDS in the 1980s." Similarly, global warming was one of the scenarios that Ehrlich described, so claiming credit for it, while disavowing responsibility for failed scenarios is a double standard. Gardner believes that Ehrlich is displaying classical signs of cognitive dissonance, and that his failure to acknowledge obvious errors of his own judgement render his current thinking suspect.

Barry Commoner has criticized Ehrlich's 1970 statement that "When you reach a point where you realize further efforts will be futile, you may as well look after yourself and your friends and enjoy what little time you have left. That point for me is 1972." Gardner has criticized Ehrlich for endorsing the strategies proposed by William and Paul Paddock in their book Famine 1975!. They had proposed a system of "triage" that would end food aid to "hopeless" countries such as India and Egypt. In Population Bomb, Ehrlich suggests that "there is no rational choice except to adopt some form of the Paddocks' strategy as far as food distribution is concerned." Had this strategy been implemented for countries such as India and Egypt, which were reliant on food aid at that time, they would almost certainly have suffered famines. Instead, both Egypt and India have greatly increased their food production and now feed much larger populations without reliance on food aid.

=== Left-wing critics ===
Another group of critics, generally of the political left, argues that Ehrlich emphasizes overpopulation too much as a problem in itself instead of distribution of resources. Barry Commoner argued that Ehrlich emphasized overpopulation too much as the source of environmental problems, and that his proposed solutions were politically unacceptable because of the coercion that they implied, and because they would cost poor people disproportionately. He argued that technological, and above all social development would result in a natural decrease of both population growth and environmental damage. Ehrlich denies any type of racism, and has argued that if his policy ideas were implemented properly they would not be repressive.

In a 2018 interview with The Guardian, Ehrlich, while still proud of The Population Bomb for starting a worldwide debate on the issues of population, acknowledged weaknesses of the book including not placing enough emphasis on overconsumption and inequality, and countering accusations of racism. He argues "too many rich people in the world is a major threat to the human future, and cultural and genetic diversity are great human resources." He advocated for an "unprecedented redistribution of wealth" in order to mitigate the problem of overconsumption of resources by the world's wealthy, but said "the rich who now run the global system — that hold the annual 'world destroyer' meetings in Davos — are unlikely to let it happen."

Ehrlich and his colleague Rodolfo Dirzo argued in a 2022 perspective paper for the need to reduce fertility rates among "the overconsuming wealthy and middle classes", and wasteful consumption in general, with the ultimate goal being to reduce "the scale of the human enterprise" in order to mitigate the contemporary extinction crisis.

=== Simon–Ehrlich wager ===
The economist Julian Simon argued in 1980 that overpopulation is not a problem as such and that humanity will adapt to changing conditions. Simon argued that eventually human creativity will improve living standards, and that most resources were replaceable. Simon stated that over hundreds of years, the prices of virtually all commodities had decreased significantly and persistently. Ehrlich termed Simon the proponent of a "space-age cargo cult" of economists convinced that human creativity and ingenuity would create substitutes for scarce resources and reasserted the idea that population growth was outstripping the Earth's supplies of food, fresh water and minerals.

This exchange resulted in the Simon–Ehrlich wager, a bet about the trend of prices for resources during a ten-year period that was made with Simon in 1980. Ehrlich was allowed to choose ten commodities that he predicted would become scarce and thus increase in price. Ehrlich chose mostly metals, and lost the bet, as their average price decreased by about 30% in the next 10 years. Simon and Ehrlich could not agree about the terms of a second bet.

=== Ehrlich's response to critics ===
Ehrlich argued that humanity has simply deferred the disaster by the use of more intensive agricultural techniques, such as those introduced during the Green Revolution. Ehrlich claimed that increasing populations and affluence are increasingly stressing the global environment, due to such factors as loss of biodiversity, overfishing, global warming, urbanization, chemical pollution and competition for raw materials. He maintained that due to growing global incomes, reducing consumption and human population is critical to protecting the environment and maintaining living standards, and that current rates of growth are still too great for a sustainable future.

== Other activities ==
Ehrlich was one of the initiators of the group Zero Population Growth, renamed Population Connection, in 1968, along with Richard Bowers and Charles Lee Remington. In 1971, Ehrlich was elected to the Common Cause National Governing Board. He and his wife Anne were part of the board of advisers of the Federation for American Immigration Reform until 2003. He was a patron of Population Matters, formerly known as the Optimum Population Trust.

Consistent with his concern about the impact of pollution and in response to a doctoral dissertation by his student Edward Goth III, Ehrlich wrote in 1977 that, "Fluorides have been shown to concentrate in food chains, and evidence suggesting a potential for significant ecological effects is accumulating."

Ehrlich spoke at conferences in Israel on the issue of desertification. He argued "true Zionists should have small families".

== Personal life ==
Ehrlich married Anne H. Ehrlich (née Howland) in December 1954. They had one daughter, Lisa Marie. He announced that he had had a vasectomy in 1963 after his child's birth.

=== Death ===
Ehrlich died of complications from cancer on March 13, 2026, at a retirement community where he lived in Palo Alto, California. He was 93.

== Awards and honors ==
- The John Muir Award of the Sierra Club, 1980
- The Gold Medal Award of the World Wildlife Fund International, 1987
- A MacArthur Prize Fellowship, 1990
- The Crafoord Prize in biosciences, awarded by the Royal Swedish Academy of Sciences, 1990
- ECI Prize winner in terrestrial ecology, 1993
- A World Ecology Award from the International Center for Tropical Ecology, University of Missouri, 1993
- The Volvo Environment Prize, 1993
- The United Nations Sasakawa Environment Prize, 1994
- The 1st Annual Heinz Award in the Environment (with Anne Ehrlich), 1995
- The Tyler Prize for Environmental Achievement, 1998
- The Dr. A. H. Heineken Prize for Environmental Sciences, 1998
- The Blue Planet Prize, 1999
- The Eminent Ecologist Award of the Ecological Society of America, 2001
- The Distinguished Scientist Award of the American Institute of Biological Sciences, 2001
- Ramon Margalef Prize in Ecology of the Generalitat of Catalonia, 2009
- Fellow of the Royal Society of London 2012
- BBVA Foundation Frontiers of Knowledge Award in Ecology and Conservation Biology, 2013

== Works ==
=== Books ===
- How to Know the Butterflies (1960)
- Process of Evolution (1963)
- Butterflies and Plants: A Study in Coevolution (1964)
- The Population Bomb (1968, revised 1971, updated 1978, re-issued 1988, 1998, 2008 and 2018)
- Population, Resources, Environments: Issues in Human Ecology (1970)
- How to Be a Survivor (1971)
- Man and the Ecosphere: Readings from Scientific American (1971)
- Population, Resources, Environments: Issues in Human Ecology Second Edition (1972)
- Human Ecology: Problems and Solutions (1973)
- Introductory Biology (1973)
- The End of Affluence (1975)
- Biology and Society (1976)
- Ecoscience: Population, Resources, Environment (1978)
- The Race Bomb (1978)
- Extinction (1981)
- The Golden Door: International Migration, Mexico, and the United States (1981)
- The Cold and the Dark: The World after Nuclear War (1984, with Carl Sagan, Donald Kennedy, and Walter Orr Roberts)
- The Machinery of Nature: The Living World Around Us and How it Works (1986)
- Earth (1987, co-authored with Anne Ehrlich)
- Science of Ecology (1987, with Joan Roughgarden)
- The Cassandra Conference: Resources and the Human Predicament (1988)
- The Birder's Handbook: A field Guide to the Natural History of North American Birds (1988, with David S. Dobkin and Darryl Wheye)
- New World, New Mind: Moving Towards Conscious Evolution (1988, co-authored with Robert E. Ornstein)
- The Population Explosion (1990, with Anne Ehrlich)
- Healing the Planet: Strategies for Resolving the Environmental Crisis (1991, co-authored with Anne Ehrlich)
- Birds in Jeopardy: The Imperiled and Extinct Birds of the United States and Canada, Including Hawaii and Puerto Rico (1992, with David S. Dobkin and Darryl Wheye)
- The Stork and the Plow : The Equity Answer to the Human Dilemma (1995, with Anne Ehrlich and Gretchen C. Daily)
- A World of Wounds: Ecologists and the Human Dilemma (1997)
- Betrayal of Science and Reason: How Anti-Environment Rhetoric Threatens Our Future (1998, with Anne Ehrlich)
- Wild Solutions: How Biodiversity is Money in the Bank (2001, with Andrew Beattie)
- Human Natures: Genes, Cultures, and the Human Prospect (2002)
- One With Nineveh: Politics, Consumption, and the Human Future (2004, with Anne Ehrlich)
- On the Wings of Checkerspots: A Model System for Population Biology (2004, edited volume, co-edited with Ilkka Hanski)
- The Dominant Animal: Human Evolution and the Environment (2008, with Anne Ehrlich)
- Humanity on a Tightrope: Thoughts on Empathy, Family, and Big Changes for a Viable Future (2010, with Robert E. Ornstein)
- Conservation Biology for All (2010, edited volume, co-edited with Navjot S. Sodhi)
- Hope on Earth: A Conversation (2014, co-authored with Michael Charles Tobias) ISBN 978-0-226-11368-5
- Killing the Koala and Poisoning the Prairie: Australia, America and the Environment (2015, co-authored with Corey J. A. Bradshaw) ISBN 978-0-226-31698-7
- The Annihilation of Nature: Human Extinction of Birds and Mammals (2015, with Anne Ehrlich and Gerardo Ceballos)
- Jaws: The Story of a Hidden Epidemic (2018, with Sandra Kahn) ISBN 978-1503604131

=== Papers ===
- Ehrlich, P. R. (2010). "The MAHB, the Culture Gap, and Some Really Inconvenient Truths". PLOS Biology. 8 (4) e1000330. doi:10.1371/journal.pbio.1000330. PMC 2850377. PMID 20386722.
- Ceballos, Gerardo; Ehrlich, Paul R.; Barnosky, Anthony D.; García, Andrés; Pringle, Robert M.; Palmer, Todd M. (2015). "Accelerated modern human–induced species losses: Entering the sixth mass extinction". Science Advances. 1 (5) e1400253. Bibcode:2015SciA....1E0253C. doi:10.1126/sciadv.1400253. PMC 4640606. PMID 26601195.
- Ceballos, Gerardo; Ehrlich, Paul R.; Dirzo, Rodolfo (May 23, 2017). "Biological annihilation via the ongoing sixth mass extinction signaled by vertebrate population losses and declines". PNAS. 114 (30): E6089–E6096. Bibcode:2017PNAS..114E6089C. doi:10.1073/pnas.1704949114. PMC 5544311. PMID 28696295.
- Dirzo, Rodolfo; Ceballos, Gerardo; Ehrlich, Paul R. (2022). "Circling the drain: the extinction crisis and the future of humanity". Philosophical Transactions of the Royal Society B. 377 (1857) 20210378. doi:10.1098/rstb.2021.0378. PMC 9237743. PMID 35757873.

== See also ==
- Demography
- Population Connection (formerly Zero Population Growth), a non-profit founded by Ehrlich
- Moral panic
- Netherlands fallacy
- Escape and radiate coevolution
