= Donne (crater) =

Crater on Mercury

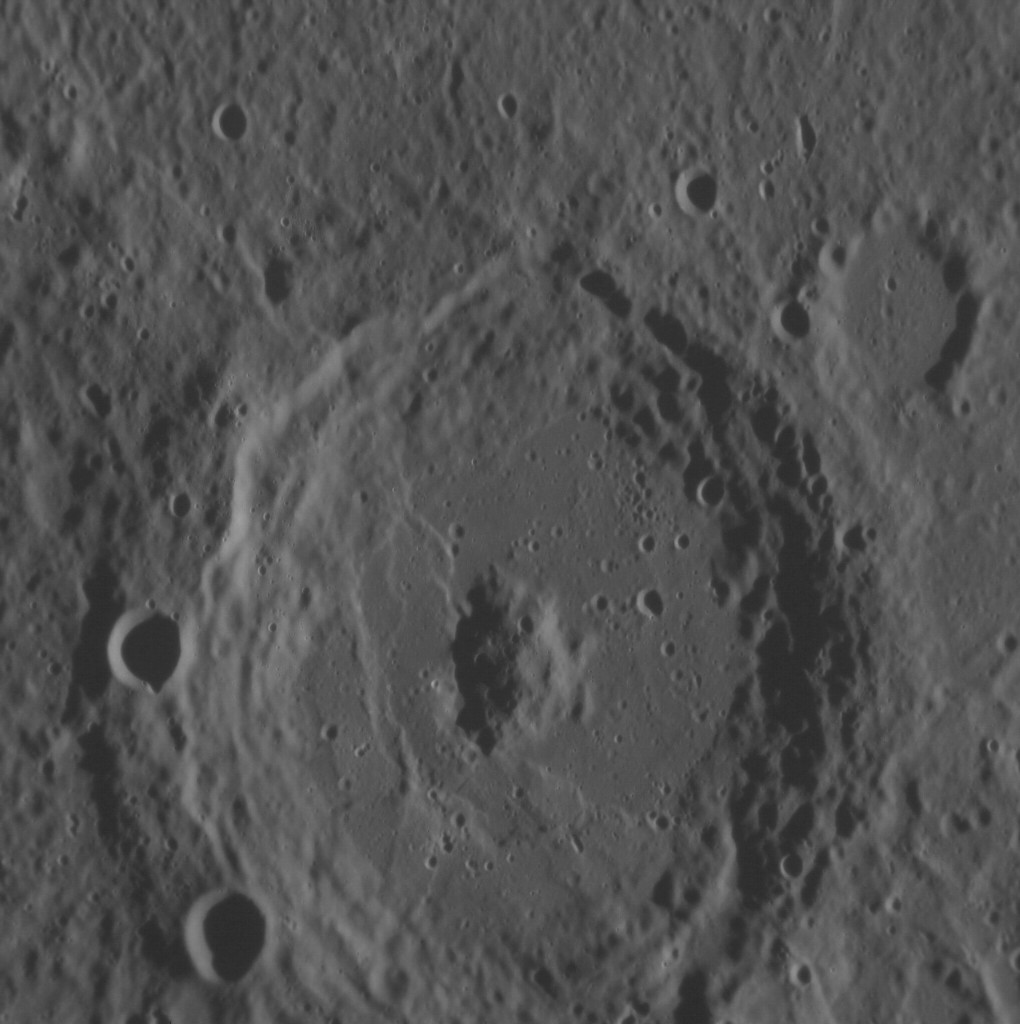
- MESSENGER NAC image of Donne
- Feature type: Central-peak impact crater
- Location: Kuiper quadrangle, Mercury
- Coordinates: 2.92°N 14.05°W
- Diameter: 86 km (53 mi)
- Eponym: John Donne

Donne is a crater on Mercury. It has a diameter of 86 kilometers. Its name was adopted by the International Astronomical Union (IAU) in 1976. Donne is named for the English poet John Donne, who lived from 1572 to 1631.

To the southwest of Donne are the three craters Lu Hsun, Al-Jāhiz, and Hun Kal. To the southeast is Warhol.

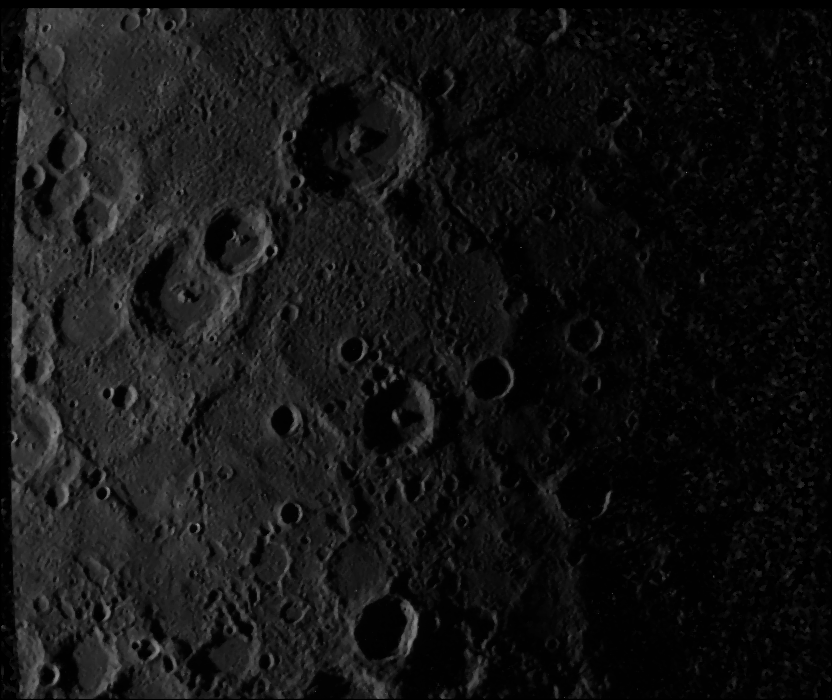
Mariner 10 image, with Donne at top

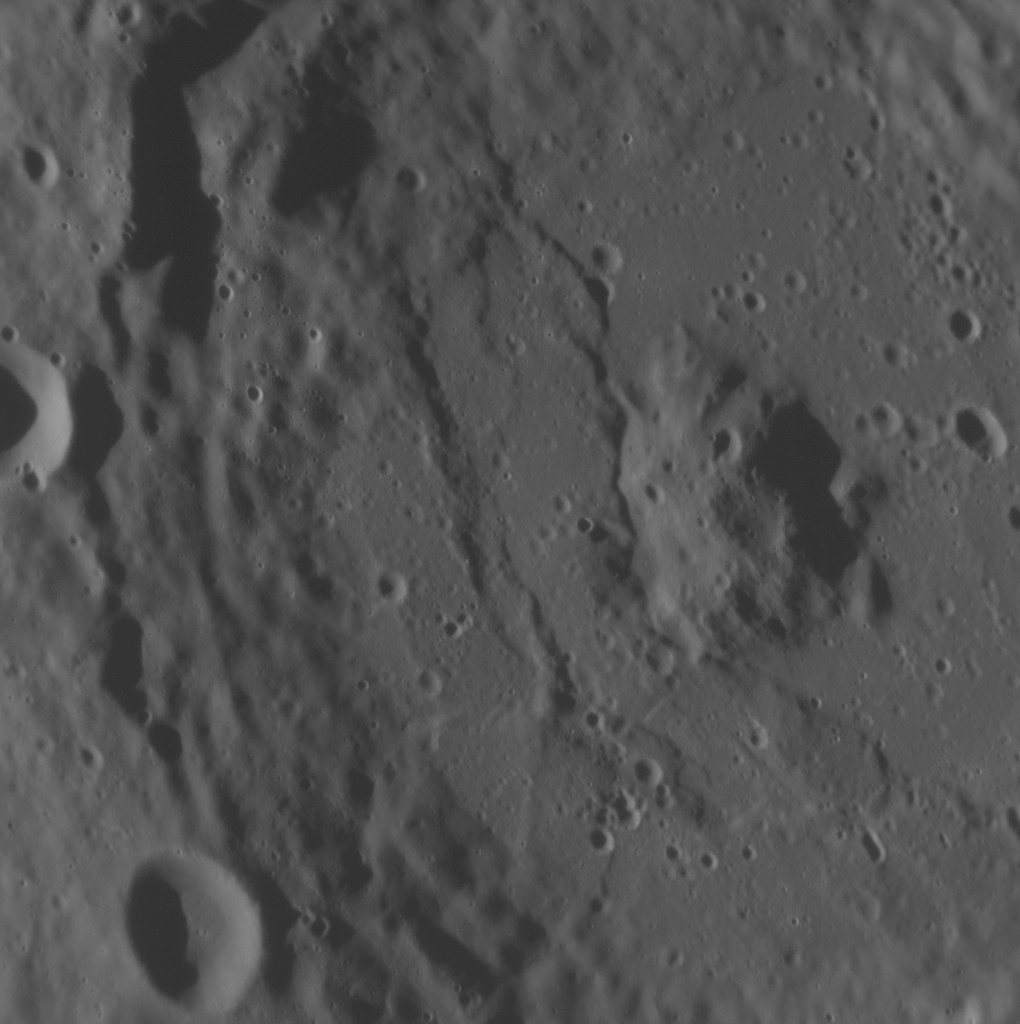
Oblique view
