= Struggle for existence =

Competition for resources needed to live

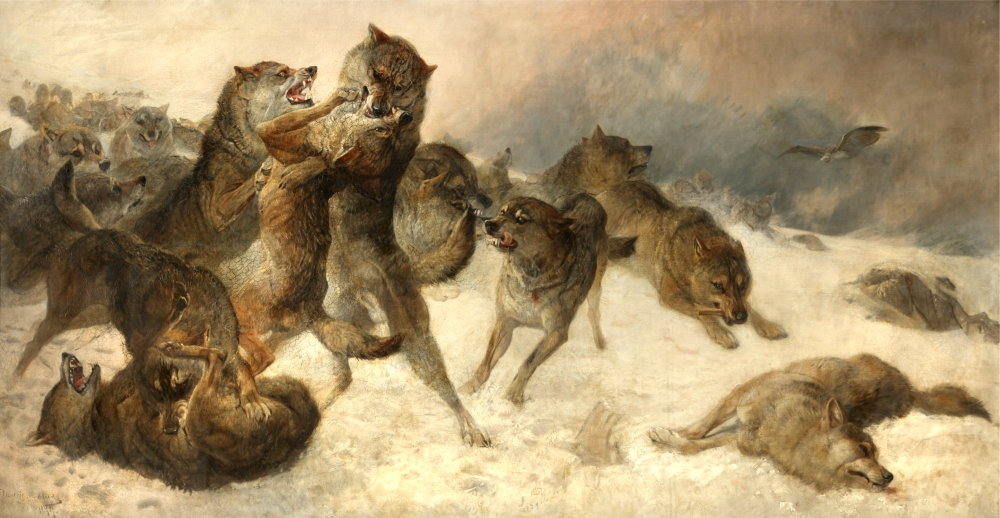
In 1879 George Bouverie Goddard depicted "The Struggle for Existence" as a fight to the death between wolves.

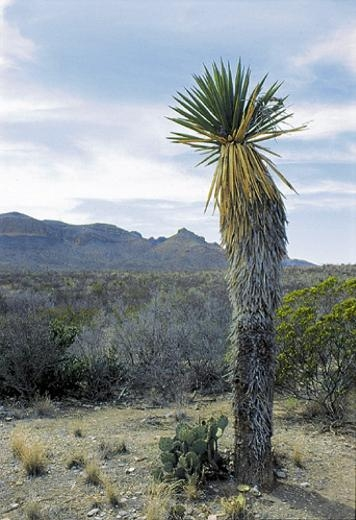
Charles Darwin used the term very broadly, giving as an example "a plant on the edge of a desert" struggling for moisture.

The concept of the struggle for existence (or struggle for life) concerns the competition or battle for resources needed to live. It can refer to human society, or to organisms in nature. The concept is ancient, and the term struggle for existence was in use by the end of the 18th century. From the 17th century onward the concept was associated with a population exceeding resources, an issue shown starkly in Thomas Robert Malthus’ An Essay on the Principle of Population which drew on Benjamin Franklin's Observations Concerning the Increase of Mankind, Peopling of Countries, etc..

It is sometimes forgotten that Charles Darwin used the term "struggle for existence" in what he called a metaphorical sense. This was because he used it to refer not only to direct competition between (and within) species but indirect competition (as with a plant at the edge of the desert). Darwin noted that the struggle for existence could also involve active or passive mutual aid between organisms of the same or different species, instancing social insects (see also symbiosis).

Darwin made the term the title of his third chapter in On the Origin of Species published in 1859. Taking up Malthus's idea of the struggle for existence, Darwin was able to develop his view of adaptation, which was highly influential in the formulation of the theory of natural selection. In addition, Alfred Wallace independently used the concept of the struggle for existence to help come to the same theory of evolution. Later, T.H. Huxley further developed the idea of the struggle for existence. Huxley did not fully agree with Darwin on natural selection, but he did agree that there was a struggle for existence in nature. Huxley also recognized that a struggle for existence existed between competing ideas within the minds of people engaged in intellectual discussion. This view is an early example of what was later described as meme theory.

While the idea of the struggle for existence was developing in the western world, there were other interpretations of the struggle for existence, especially by Peter Kropotkin in Russia. Borrowing the phrase mutual aid from Darwin, he published Mutual Aid: A Factor of Evolution, partially as a response to an essay called "The Struggle for Existence" by Huxley. Also, the struggle for existence was questioned in the United States in the 1930s, as the idea of cooperation among organisms became popular. More recently, it has been argued that the struggle for existence is not as important on macroevolutionary time scales.

== Background ==
The idea of the struggle for existence has been used in multiple disciplines. It became popular in the mid 19th century, through the work of Malthus, Darwin, Wallace, and others. The most popular use of the struggle for existence is in the explanation of the theory of natural selection by Charles Darwin. For more technical information on how the struggle for existence is meshed with the theory of natural selection see the main article for natural selection.

== Historical development ==
The concept of a struggle for existence goes back to antiquity: Heraclitus of Ephesus wrote of struggle being the father of everything, and Aristotle in his History of Animals observed that "There is enmity between such animals as dwell in the same localities or subsist on the same food. If the means of subsistence run short, creatures of like kind will fight together." From translations, the 9th century Arabic scholar Al-Jahiz apparently listed ways in which animals "can not exist without food, neither can the hunting animal escape being hunted in his turn", similarly "God has disposed some human beings as a cause of life for others, and likewise, he has disposed the latter as a cause of the death of the former."

In his Leviathan of 1651, Thomas Hobbes described vividly an unbridled human struggle over resources, a "war of every man against every man" if unrestrained by state power. This was the doctrine of bellum omnium contra omnes.

Matthew Hale in The Primitive Origination of Mankind, Considered and Examined According to the Light of Nature (1677) described the struggles of hunter and prey animals. Anticipating Malthus, he proposed that a wise Providence made periodic Reductions in excessive numbers of animals, as with human population "to keep it within such bounds as may keep it from surcharging the World" so that "by these Prunings there may be a consistency in the Numbers of Mankind, with an eternal succession of individuals." The Reductions experienced by humanity were "1. Plagues and Epidemical Diseases: 2. Famines: 3. Wars and Internecions: 4. Floods and Inundations: 5: Conflagrations."

=== Buffon and Franklin, population growth ===
Population increase causing the struggle for existence was given numerical expression by Buffon in 1751. He calculated that an elm seed would produce a tree which, after 10 years, produced 1,000 seeds. If each were sown, the whole globe would be converted into trees in 150 years. Similarly, "if we were to hatch every egg produced by hens for a space of 30 years, there would be a sufficient number of fowls to cover the whole surface of the earth." Taking the example of herrings, if "prodigious numbers of them were not destroyed" each year they would soon cover the surface of the sea, but they would then be destroyed by "contagion and famine", so it was necessary and right that animals preyed on each other.

Amidst debates on fears of British depopulation, Benjamin Franklin collected statistics of the American colonies which he published in his Poor Richard Improved of 1750 with the question of "how long will it be, before by an Increase of 64 per Annum, 34,000 people will double themselves?" He concluded: "People increase faster by Generation in these Colonies, where all can have full Employ, and there is Room and Business for Millions yet unborn. For in old settled Countries, as England for instance, as soon as the Number of People is as great as can be supported by all the Tillage, Manufactures, Trade and Offices of the Country, the Over-plus must quit the Country, or they will perish by Poverty, Diseases, and want of Necessaries. Marriage too, is discouraged, many declining it, till they can see how they shall be able to maintain a Family." In 1751, Franklin wrote his Observations Concerning the Increase of Mankind, Peopling of Countries, etc. proposing a 25-year doubling period in the colonies, an exponential growth in population. Over the following century, this forecast was remarkably accurate. His paper was widely circulated, and had considerable influence: Malthus cited the period as "a rate in which all concurring testimonies agree." Franklin's view was optimistic:

There is, in short, no bound to the prolific nature of plants or animals, but what is made by their crowding and interfering with each other's means of subsistence. Was the face of Earth vacant of other plants, it might be gradually sowed and overspread with one kind only, as, for instance, with fennel; and, were it empty of other inhabitants, it might in a few ages be replenished from one nation only, as, for instance, with Englishmen.

Those migrating to America would "have their places at home soon supplied" and "increase so largely here" that there was no need for other immigrants.

=== Balance of warring nature ===
Natural theology continued an earlier theme of harmonious balance between plants and animals. In the late 18th century, naturalists saw the struggle for existence as part of an ordered balance of nature, but they increasingly recognised the fierceness of struggle and the fossil record shook ideas of permanent harmony. Carl Linnaeus saw an overall benign balance, but also showed calculations of the Earth quickly filling with one species if it reproduced unchecked, and referred to "bellum omnium perpetuum in omnes, et horrenda laniena" (a perpetual war of all against all, and horrible massacre).

In 1773 James Burnett, Lord Monboddo, noted that "the most fruitful country can be overstocked with any animal and particularly with man", and "when men were so multiplied that the natural fruits of the earth could not maintain them", they could emigrate, prey on other animals or each other, or preferably "associate and provide in common what singly they could not procure." In 1775 Kant visualised inner and outer struggle as the impetus for man passing from a rude state of nature to a citizen, Herder in 1784 saw a personified Nature promoting huge numbers of organisms competing for resources so that "the whole creation is at war", crowding "her creatures one upon another" to "produce the greatest number and variety of living beings in the least space, so that one crushes another, and an equilibrium of powers can alone bring peace to the creation." For William Smellie in 1790 a profusion of animal life improved "in proportion to the number of enemies they have to attack or evade", and by making animals feed upon each other, the system of animation and of happiness is extended to the greatest possible degree. In this view, Nature, instead of being cruel and oppressive, is highly generous and beneficent."

Erasmus Darwin in his Temple of Nature (published 1803) returned to Linnaean imagery, "From Hunger's arms the shafts of Death are hurl'd; And one great Slaughter‐house the warring world!".

=== Origins of the term ===
The term struggle for existence was already in use by this time. For example, in 1790 Jeremy Bentham proposed reformed elections as "a contest for distinction, not a struggle for existence", and in 1795 The Monthly Review used it to describe trees when discussing Thomas Cooper's Some Information Respecting America. In a House of Lords speech on 2 November 1797, Lord Gwydir said they were engaged "in a struggle for existence as a nation" in the French Revolutionary Wars. Benjamin Disraeli included the phrase "a density of population implies a severe struggle for existence" in his novel Sybil (1845), which was about the plight of the working class in Britain.

=== Malthus ===
Malthusian curve. Thomas Robert Malthus argues that a population will increase exponentially if unchecked, while resources will only increase arithmetically.

In An Essay on the Principle of Population, Thomas Robert Malthus argues that a population will increase exponentially if unchecked, while resources will only increase arithmetically. This is seen graphically in the adjacent image and is commonly referred to as the Malthusian curve. Malthus knew that with limited resources on earth, there would be competition among people to exist and survive. He coined the phrase the Malthusian catastrophe to explain how there were positive checks in human populations like famine and disease that kept the population from rising too quickly. The checks that exist on the human population growth result in a struggle for existence. Malthus also notes that the checks on the human population are more complicated than those on animals and plants. Malthus explains, for example, that a human check on population growth is the conscious decision not to reproduce because of financial burden. Malthus then explains that the main check on population growth is food. In periods of high food availability the population increases, while in periods of food shortages, the population decreases. Thus, "population [growth] tends to oscillate around its means of subsistence." The combination of Malthus' "law of multiplication in geometrical progression" and "the law of limited population" leads to the idea of the struggle for existence. Despite these ideas, Malthus was a religious man and believed in divine laws that governed the natural world.

=== De Candolle and Lyell ===
In 1832, Augustin Pyramus de Candolle concisely described the struggle between species of plants in a chapter about parasitism. His friend Charles Lyell quoted this passage in the second volume of Principles of Geology:

"All the plants of a given country," says Decandolle in his usual spirited style, "are at war one with another. The first which establish themselves by chance in a particular spot, tend, by the mere occupancy of space, to exclude other species—the greater choke the smaller, the longest livers replace those which last for a shorter period, the more prolific gradually make themselves masters of the ground, which species multiplying more slowly would otherwise fill."

In this volume, Lyell strongly defended his view that species were fixed against ideas of transmutation of species. To explain adaptation, Lamarck proposed that species did not become extinct, but constantly transformed to suit a changing environment: Lyell believed in essentialism in which species were fixed so could not adapt to change, and became extinct. Hybrids had been proposed as evidence of transmutation; Lyell argued that they would not survive to make new species.

If we consider the vegetable kingdom generally, it must be recollected, that even of the seeds which are well ripened, the greater part are either eaten by insects, birds, and other animals, or decay for want of room and opportunity to germinate. Unhealthy plants are the first which are cut off by causes prejudicial to the species, being usually stifled by more vigorous individuals of their own kind. If, therefore, the relative fecundity or hardiness of hybrids be in the least degree inferior, they cannot maintain their footing for many generations, even if they were ever produced beyond one generation in a wild state. In the universal struggle for existence, the right of the strongest eventually prevails; and the strength and durability of a race depends mainly on its prolificness, in which hybrids are acknowledged to be deficient.

=== Darwin ===
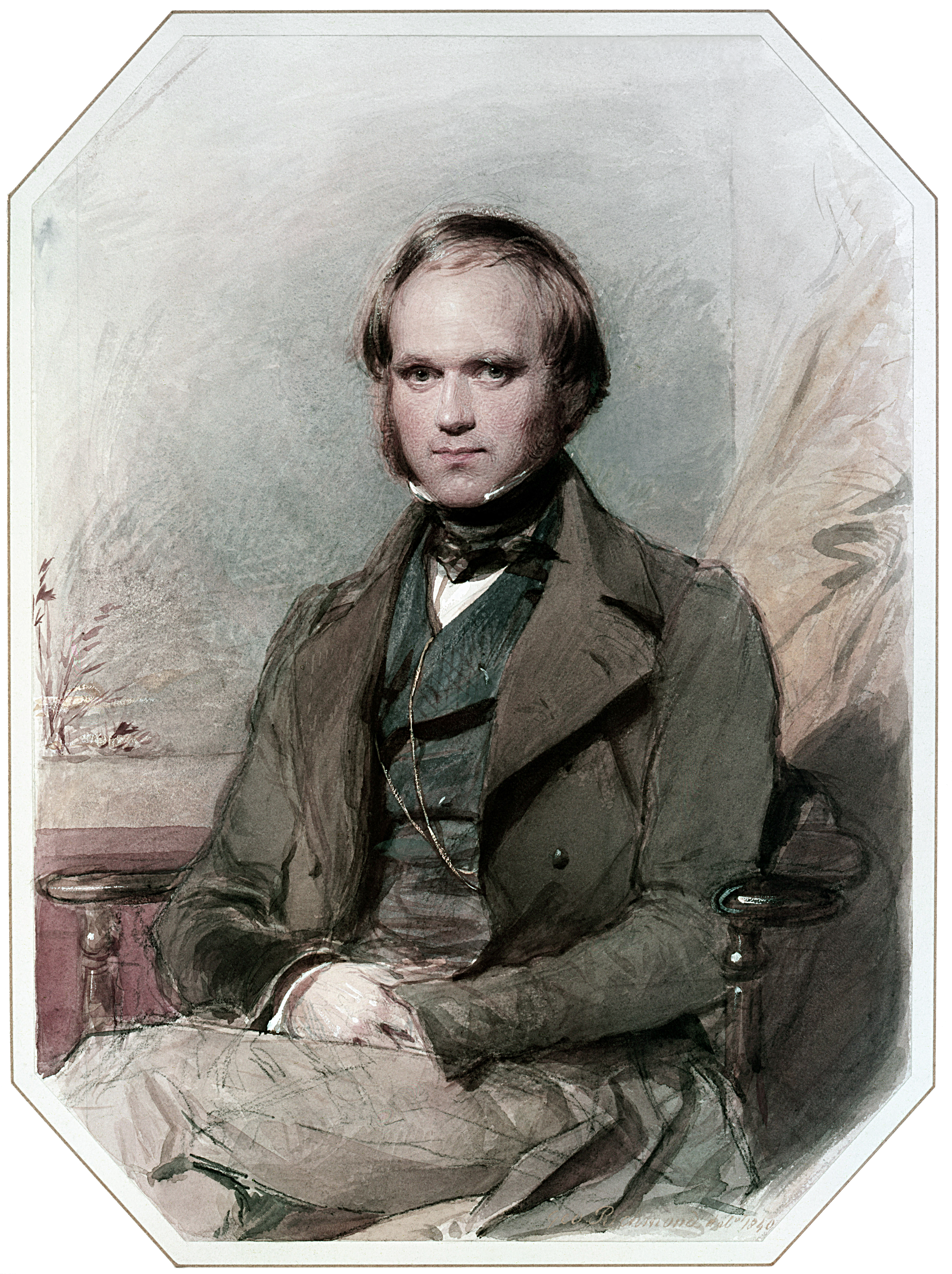
In the late 1830s, Charles Darwin began developing his ideas of "warring of the species" leading to natural selection.

Charles Darwin initially shared the belief that nature was perfect and harmonious: after graduating as a student at the University of Cambridge in 1831, he was convinced by William Paley's Natural Theology or Evidences of the Existence and Attributes of the Deity which saw adaptation as purposeful design and presented population pressure optimistically; "it is a happy world after all". By mid January 1832, early in the Beagle voyage, Darwin saw geology from Charles Lyell's viewpoint. When the second volume of Lyell's Principles of Geology was delivered to the Beagle that November, Darwin accepted its argument that the "struggle for existence" disproved transmutation of species. He was reminded of Malthusianism when his sisters sent him out pamphlets by Harriet Martineau. Lyell had been unable to show the mechanism for introducing new species, and towards the end of the voyage Darwin noted that the distribution of mockingbirds found on the Galápagos Islands raised doubts that species were fixed.

Early in 1837 John Gould in London revealed that the mockingbirds were separate species: Darwin was spurred into intensive research and the inception of his theory to find the mechanism introducing species. Unconventionally, he sought information from animal breeders. In September 1838, while investigating variation, averages and population statistics, he read Malthus’ An Essay on the Principle of Population, and wrote:

We ought to be far from wondering of changes in numbers of species, from small changes in nature of locality. Even the energetic language of ~~Malthus~~ Decandolle does not convey the warring of the species as inference from Malthus. – increase of brutes must be prevented solely by positive checks, excepting that famine may stop desire. – in nature production does not increase, whilst no check prevail, but the positive check of famine & consequently death. Population is increase at geometrical ratio in far shorter time than 25 years — yet until the one sentence of Malthus no one clearly perceived the great check amongst men

That sentence is on page 6 of the first volume of Malthus' Essay, 6th edition: "It may safely be pronounced, therefore, that the population, when unchecked, goes on doubling itself every twenty five years, or increases in a geometrical ratio." At first Darwin suggested species competing for resources, six months later he saw competition between individuals of the same species: in mid March 1839 he wrote of the "dreadful but quiet war of organic beings. going on the peaceful woods. & smiling fields" in which "a grain of sand turns the balance", a month later he wrote, of the "innumerable seeds" of a bulrush, "if a seed were produced with infinitesimal advantage it would have better chance of being propagated". He began to see a similarity between farmers selecting breeding livestock and what he came to call natural selection, still thinking of this as a benevolent law ordained to create adaptation.

In his 1842 sketch expanding his theory, Darwin wrote that "De Candolle's war of nature,—seeing contented face of nature,—may be well at first doubted", but "considering the enormous geometrical power of increase in every organism" countries "must be fully stocked" referring to "Malthus on man": later in the sketch he used the phrase "struggle of nature", and on the back of one sheet "struggle of existence". In his 1844 Essay Darwin began his section on Natural Means of Selection with "De Candolle, in an eloquent passage, has declared that all nature is at war, one organism with another, or with external nature", and described this "war" as "the doctrine of Malthus applied in most cases with ten-fold force." In later sections, including the summary, he used the phrase "struggle for existence", which he had read in several books including Lyell's Geology. On 3 March 1857 he wrote chapter 5 of his "big book" on his theory, initially headed "On Natural Selection". The relevant section, titled "Struggle of Nature" had as an alternative title "War of Nature". At a later date he changed the chapter heading to "The Struggle For Existence As Bearing On Natural Selection" and made the section title "The Struggle for existence", making this his main theme to allow a broader interpretation than one of war between organisms: he used the phrase "in a very large sense" to include mutual dependency and the physical environmental as when "a plant on the edge of a desert is often said to struggle for existence" due to its need for moisture.

In his "Abstract" of his book, quickly written and published as On the Origin of Species in 1859, Darwin made his third chapter "Struggle for Existence" . After "a few preliminary remarks" relating it to natural selection, and acknowledgement that the "elder De Candolle and Lyell have largely and philosophically shown that all organic beings are exposed to severe competition", he wrote that:

A struggle for existence inevitably follows from the high rate at which all organic beings tend to increase [so that] on the principle of geometrical increase, its numbers would quickly become so inordinately great that no country could support the product. Hence, as more individuals are produced than can possibly survive, there must in every case be a struggle for existence, either one individual with another of the same species, or with the individuals of distinct species, or with the physical conditions of life. It is the doctrine of Malthus applied with manifold force to the whole animal and vegetable kingdoms".

Darwin gradually included the idea that adaptations were not from birth, but rather from organisms responding to external pressures. This describes Darwin's change from teleological explanation to transmutationist thought which was influential the change in Darwin's understanding of nature from 1837 to the 1850s. From Malthus, Darwin claims that the idea of a struggle for existence allowed him to see that favorable variations would be preserved while unfavorable variations would not resulting in the evolution new species. Thus, by the spring of 1837, Darwin had changed from supporting the idea that each species was independently created to supporting the notion that each species was descended from another species - the switch from teleological to transmutationist views. In relation to the struggle for existence, Darwin explains in Origin of Species that "forms that are successful in the struggle for existence are deemed to be slightly better adapted than those with which they have had to compete for their places in the economy of nature". Supporting this claim, in about 1855, Darwin noted that the struggle for existence would produce diversification – leading to Darwin's principle of divergence. Finally, Darwin stresses the fact that the struggle for existence is a metaphor for the larger natural workings rather than the literal struggle between two individual organisms. T.H. Huxley, commonly known as Darwin's Bulldog, clearly explains the struggle for existence in terms of natural selection. Huxley explains that the struggle for existence is concluded based on the fact that populations grow geometrically if unchecked but populations tend to stay constant in number over time.

=== Wallace ===
Alfred Wallace and Darwin independently arrived at the theory of evolution by natural selection. Similar to Darwin, Wallace used Malthus's idea of the struggle for existence to reach this conclusion. In addition, Wallace was influenced by Charles Lyell's Principles of Geology. Lyell discusses a struggle between organisms that causes one species to become extinct; Wallace may have taken the phrase struggle for existence from this example. Additionally, Wallace claimed that it was the collection of chapters 3–12 of the first volume of An Essay on the Principle of Population that helped him develop his theory. "In these chapters are comprised very detailed accounts from all available sources of the various causes which keep down the population of savage and barbarous nations." Then, in 1853, Wallace first used the phrase "struggle for existence" when discussing the issue of slavery. By 1855, Wallace had made connections between the struggle for existence and overall population. Wallace saw in Malthus's writing how there are different ways in which a population can be kept in check:

"From "the law of multiplication in geometrical progression" (the fact that all species have the power to increase their number up to as much as a thousandfold per year) and "the law of limited population" (the fact that the number of living individuals of each species typically remains almost stationary), one deduces that there is a struggle for existence."

Wallace combined the idea of the struggle for existence with variation to argue for the idea of "survival of the fittest."

=== Modern Synthesis ===
When the modern synthesis of Darwinism and Mendelian genetics was formulated in the 1930s and 1940s, Darwinians began to discount the struggle for existence as a cause of natural selection. Advocates of the modern synthesis recast Darwin's theory in a way that saw selection occurring whether or not resources were scarce. All that mattered was that there were differences of fitness within a population. Commenting on the previously central role of Malthusian population pressure, Ronald Fisher, a preeminent synthetic theorist, wrote in 1930 that there was ‘something like a relic of creationist philosophy in arguing from the observation, let us say, that a cod spawns a million eggs, that therefore its offspring are subject to Natural Selection.'

According to Darwin, both variation and the struggle for existence were in large part consequences of living organisms' active responses to the ways they were positioned in the complex 'web of relations' which made up their own particular habitat. The modern synthesis proposed instead, first, that the principal sources of the variations winnowed by natural selection were biochemical rather than phenotypic: genetic mutation and genetic recombination. Secondly, rather than seeing natural selection as a consequence of living organisms' struggle for existence in a theatre of agency, organisms fell out of the evolutionary picture entirely and the selecting agency was reconceived as the environment. Overlooking the fact (stressed by Darwin) that the inheritance of parental characteristics requires both the transmission of heritable material and its development, scientists commonly discounted the roles of ontogeny and epigenesis in the development of an individual's adaptations and spoke of DNA simply programming the observable characteristics of organisms. This cast genes—not organisms—as the principal target of selection, whether they were selfish, cooperative, or otherwise. In this scenario, phenotypes become mere stooges, temporary vehicles for conveying genes from generation to generation. This reconceptualization was epitomized in Richard Dawkins' book The Selfish Gene (1976) which attributed agency to genes/DNA and reduced the organisms whose cells they inhabited to passive vehicles or what he called 'lumbering robots'.

The findings of 21st century evolutionary biology have given a new lease of life to Darwin's idea of the struggle for existence. Evidence that the actions of living organisms often create new competitive advantages for their species is now central to several of today's Extended Evolutionary Syntheses.

== Alternative theories: Mutual aid and cooperation ==
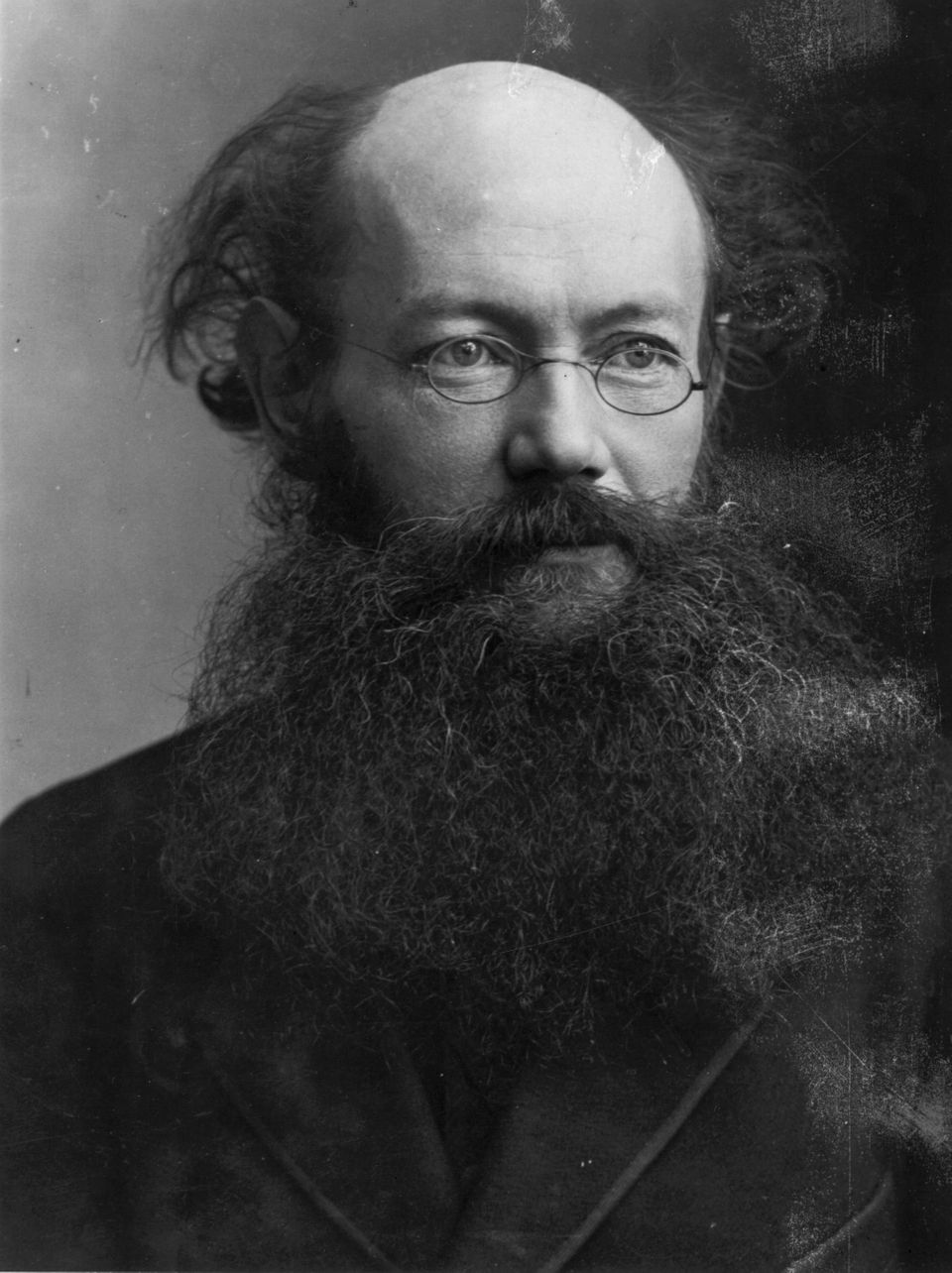
Peter Kropotkin wrote the book Mutual Aid: A Factor of Evolution in response to the idea of evolution by natural selection.

In Russia, the idea of "mutual aid" was used to explain evolution rather than the struggle for existence. Borrowing the phrase mutual aid from Darwin, Peter Kropotkin penned Mutual Aid: A Factor of Evolution partially as a response to Huxley's essay "The Struggle for Existence". Due to the vast landscape and lack of population in proportion to land, many people of Russia did not see the struggle for existence and could not relate to Malthus's ideas on population. Thus, it was concluded that cooperation, which is more successful in battling the abiotic environment, rather than competition is a driving factor in natural selection. Rather than a struggle for existence, a mutual struggle and mutual aid drives natural selection. Kropotkin believed that Wallace and Darwin saw the struggle for existence in largely competitive terms because of their coastal location and overpopulated areas of study.

During the 1930s in the United States, a shift in scientific perception caused scientists to lean away from the use of the struggle for existence to explain Darwin's ideas, and more toward the idea of cooperation for mutual benefit. The Chicago School was famous in the 20th century for its study of ecology. At the Chicago School scientists studied the cooperation and competition between organisms—findings included that competition worked "as both a cooperative and a disoperative force" at a population level.

Warder Clyde Allee, famous for the Allee effect, also supported this idea that cooperation in addition to the struggle for existence drove evolution. "Allee argued that 'individual-against-individual competition, such as brings about the peck-order type of social organization of flocks of hens, may serve to build a cooperative social unit better fitted to compete or to co-operate with other flocks at the group level than are socially unorganized groups.' Competition in this case could be considered cooperative, especially when viewed from the standpoint of group selection." Thus, although the idea of the struggle for existence remained except with the added complexity of cooperation within the struggle.

Finally, Alfred E. Emerson supported similar claims around this time period. Emerson saw a struggle for existence on the individual level, but he saw the struggle necessary on a population level for keeping the ecosystem in order. "For Emerson, cooperation was important because it contributed to greater homeostatic control; it was homeostasis that was the phenomenon of interest." Emerson believed that "what appeared to individual competition at one level might be group homeostasis on another."

== Opposition ==
The main opposition to the struggle for existence came from natural theologists who believed in perfect harmony and perfection. The belief that creatures were perfectly adapted to their environment held strong in society, and even Darwin did not abandon this belief until he returned from his voyage on the Beagle. The struggle for existence faced controversy in terms of its political implications. Malthus was criticized for idea that the poor should practice restraint in marriage. "Malthus's criticisms of the Old Poor Law were more hateful to his adversaries than anything else he ever wrote." Malthus's understanding of the struggle for existence and his writing as a result caused controversy. Additionally, critics said that Malthus "never cleared his mind entirely of the dismal theory which he began."

More recently. K.D. Bennett has argued that the struggle for existence is only present on geographically small scales. He notes that "As climates fluctuate on Milankovitch time-scales, the tendency for populations to increase exponentially is realized, distributions increase enormously, and any struggle for existence is relaxed or eliminated."

== Present-day application ==
Over recent years, the role of the struggle for existence in natural selection has become increasingly contentious in evolutionary biology. The language of the modern synthesis still dominates professional discussion, directing scientists' (and layfolks') attention to the permutations and combinations of DNA rather than those of living organisms. However, with the rise of Extended Evolutionary Syntheses, which challenge the genes-eye view of evolution first promulgated by 20th century evolutionary biologists, the struggle for existence is retaking its place as a central dynamic in evolution by natural selection.

== See also ==
- Reverence for Life
- Will to live
