= Charles Pellat =

French Algerian academic (1914–1992)

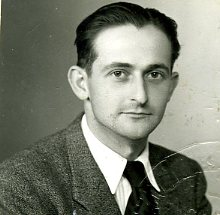
Charles Pellat

Charles Pellat (28 September 1914, in Souk Ahras – 28 October 1992, in Bourg-la-Reine) was a French Algerian academic, historian, translator, and scholar of Oriental studies, specialized in Arab studies and Islamic studies. He was an editor of the Encyclopaedia of Islam published by Brill Academic Publishers, and a member of the Académie des Inscriptions et Belles-Lettres.

== Biography ==
Charles Pellat was born in Souk Ahras, French Algeria.

He was professor of Arabic at the Collège Louis le Grand from 1947 to 1951, at the École des langues orientales from 1951 to 1956, and at the Sorbonne from 1956 to 1978. In 1984 he became a member of the Académie des Inscriptions et Belles-Lettres.

He was a contributing editor to several articles of the second edition of the Encyclopaedia of Islam, published by Brill Academic Publishers; throughout his career, he had translated several works written in Arabic by the classical Muslim scholar al-Jāḥiẓ (781-869 CE) into French.

== Works ==
- (ed.) Description de l'Occident musulman au IVe-Xe siècle by Al-Muqaddasi
- (tr. from Italian) La Littérature arabe des origines à l'époque de la dynastie umayyade: leçons professées en arabe by Carlo-Alfonso Nallino. Paris: Maisonneuve, 1950.
- (tr. from Arabic) Le livre des avares by al-Jāḥiẓ. Paris: Maisonneuve, 1951.
- L'arabe vivant. Mots arabes groupes d'apres le sens et vocabulaire fondamental de l'arabe moderne, Paris, 1952.
- Langue et littérature arabes, Paris: Colin, 1952.
- Le milieu baṣrien et la formation de Ǧāḫiẓ, Paris: Adrien-Maisonneuve, 1953,
- (tr. from Arabic) Le livre de la couronne: Kitāb at-tāǧ (fī ạḫlāq al-mulūk) by al-Jāḥiẓ. Paris: Société d'édition "Les belles lettres", 1954.
- (ed.) Le Kitāb at-tarbīʿ wa-t-tadwīr de Ğāḥiẓ by al-Jāḥiẓ. Damascus: Institut franc̜ais de Damas, 1955.
- Textes berbères dans le parler des Ait Seghrouchen de la Moulouya, Paris: Larose, 1955.
- Livre des mulets by al-Jāḥiẓ. Cairo: Muṣṭafā al-Bābī al-Ḥalabī, 1955.
- Introduction a l'arabe moderne, Paris: Librairie D'Amerique et D'Orient, Adrien-Maisonneuve, 1961.
- (ed.) Le calendrier de Cordoue by Abu-'l-Ḥasan ʿArīb Ibn-Saʿd al-Kātib al-Qurṭubī. New edition of the first impression, 1873. Leiden: Brill, 1961.
- (ed. with Claude Cahen) Études arabes et islamiques : actes du XXIXe Congrès international des orientalistes , Paris: L'Asiathèque, 1975 .
- Etudes sur l'histoire socio-culturelle de l'Islam, VIIe-XVe s., London: Variorum reprints, 1976.
- (tr.) Conseilleur du calife by Ibn al-Muqaffa'. Paris: G.-P. Maisonneuve et Larose, 1976.
- Textes arabes relatifs à la dactylonomie, Paris: Maisonneuve & Larose, 1977.
- (ed.) Cinq calendries égyptiens, Cairo: Inst. français d'archéologie orientale, 1986.
- [Anon.], 'Liwât', in The Encyclopaedia of Islam. Republished annotated by Arno Schmitt, in A. Schmitt & Jehoaeda Sofer, eds., Sexuality; Eroticism Among Males in Muslim Societies, 1995.
