= No Struggle for Existence, No Natural Selection =

1908 book by George Paulin

No Struggle for Existence, No Natural Selection: A Critical Examination of the Fundamental Principles of the Darwinian Theory
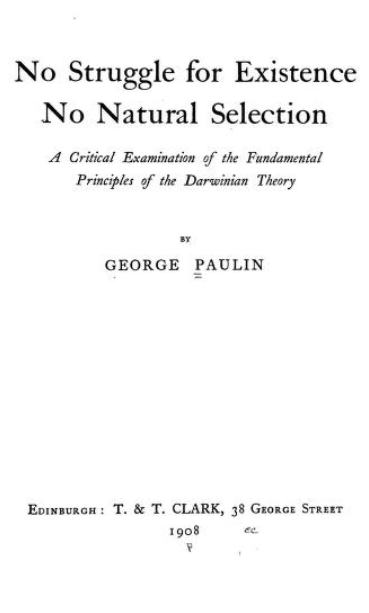
- Title page for No Struggle for Existence, No Natural Selection (1908)
- Author: George Paulin
- Publication date: 1908

No Struggle for Existence, No Natural Selection: A Critical Examination of the Fundamental Principles of the Darwinian Theory is a 1908 book by George Paulin.

Paulin argues in the book that there is no struggle for existence in nature and that all small individual variations are eventually eliminated by cross-breeding. The book heavily criticized Charles Darwin's writings on natural selection and also attempted to refute Malthusian theory.

The book was negatively reviewed in the British Medical Journal claiming "we are not sufficiently impressed by [the] author's arguments". One of Paulin's main arguments was that carnivora rarely attack each other and the male in all species is found to kill the young at birth.

Paulin stated that "Darwin's conception of the cruelty of nature to her sentient offspring is wholly mistaken." He argued that the struggle for existence emphasized by Darwin was immoral. This was disputed by a reviewer who wrote that Paulin's idea that there was no struggle for existence amongst animals, because of the destruction of young offspring by males is "more revolting than the most horrible struggle for existence suggested by Darwin and the attempt to fix a charge of immorality upon scientific theorems with which we do not agree is itself of doubtful morality."

The philosopher Edmund Hollands also negatively reviewed the book pointing out that Paulin was "apparently not a biologist, nor is he much read in biological literature... Mr. Paulin himself espouses Lamarckism in the body of his book, though without at any time considering, or even perceiving, the difficulties involved in it."
