= Hun Kal (crater) =

Crater on Mercury

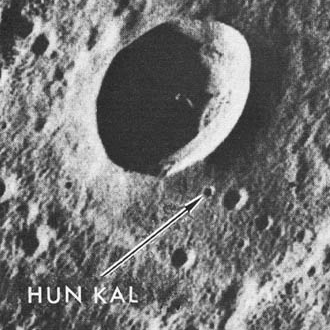
- Hun Kal is indicated by the arrow.
- Feature type: Impact crater
- Location: Kuiper quadrangle, Mercury
- Coordinates: 0.46°S 20.01°W
- Diameter: 1.13 km (0.70 mi)
- Eponym: '20' in the Mayan language

Hun Kal is a small (about 1.5 km in diameter) crater on Mercury that serves as the reference point for the planet's system of longitude. The longitude of Hun Kal's center is defined as being 20° W, thus establishing the planet's prime meridian. The name "Hun Kal" means '20' in the language of the Maya.

Hun Kal was chosen as a reference point since the actual prime meridian was in shadow when Mariner 10 photographed the region, hiding any features near 0° longitude from view.

The prime meridian of Mercury is thermocentric; it runs through the point on the equator where the planet is hottest (due to the planet's rotation and orbit, the sun briefly retrogrades at noon at this point during perihelion, giving it more sunlight).

The large crater in which Hun Kal lies is not named. To the northwest is Al-Jāhiz crater, and to the west is Lu Hsun crater.

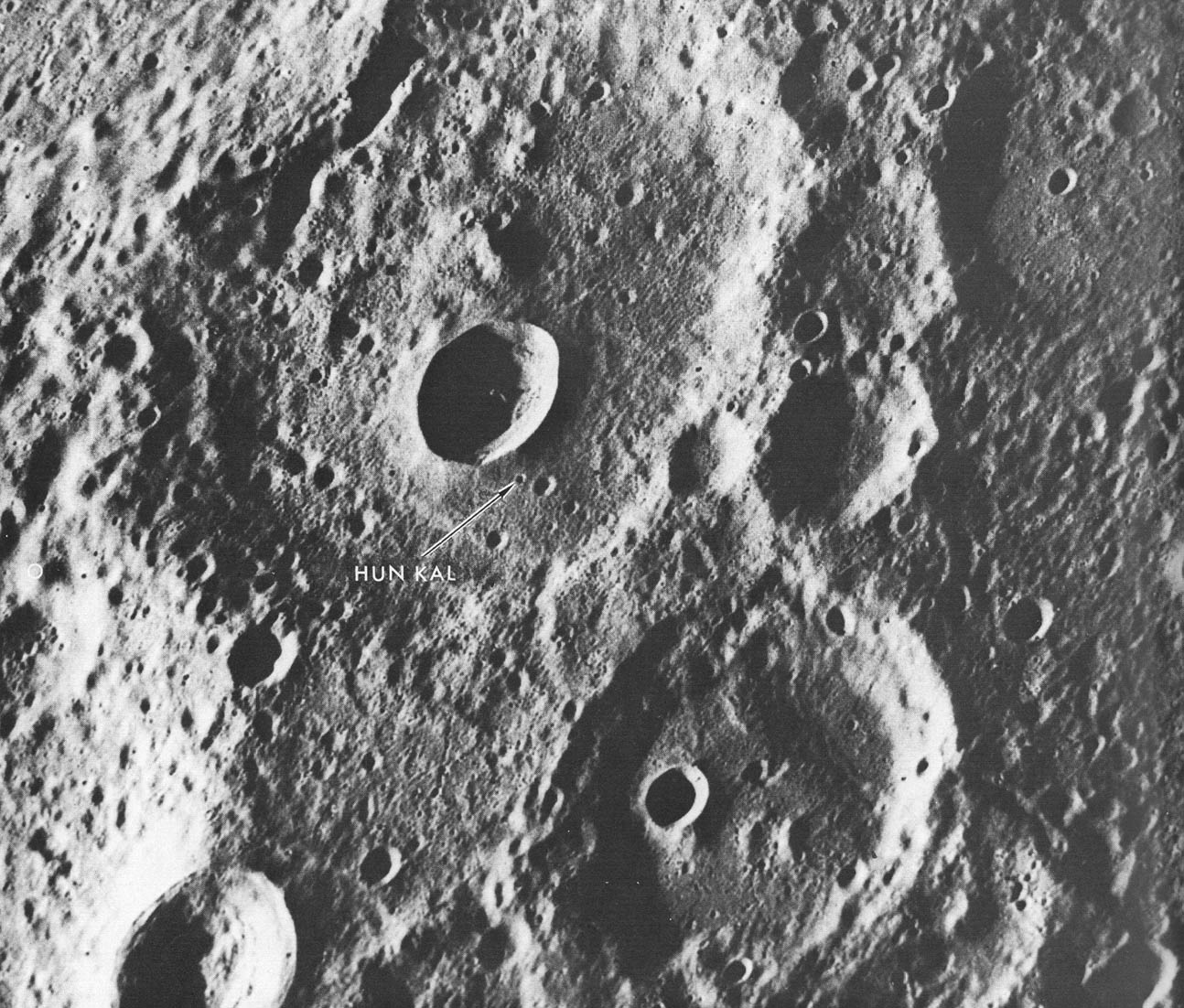
This Mariner 10 image shows the surrounding context of Hun Kal, which is almost invisibly tiny near the center.

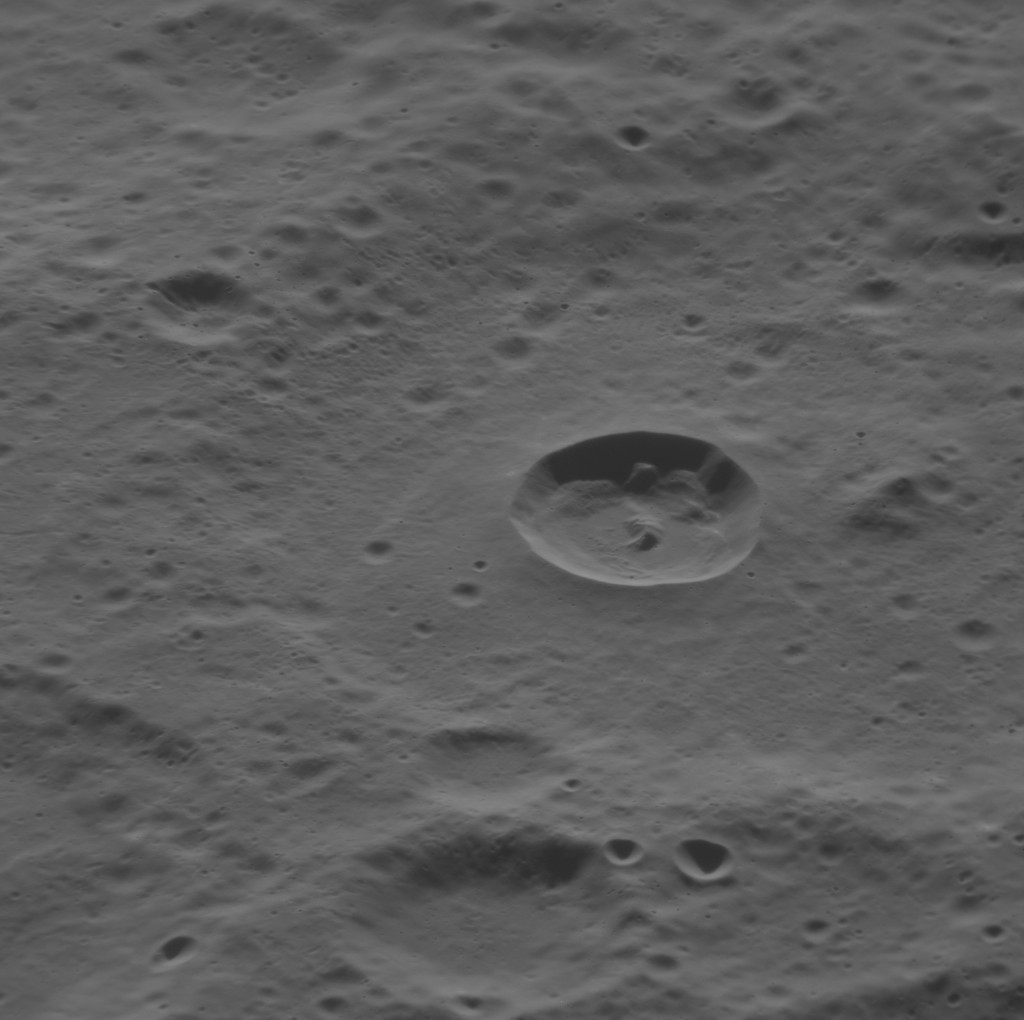
MESSENGER NAC image with Hun Kal at center
