= Theory of population =

Theory of population may refer to:

- Malthusianism, a theory of population by Thomas Malthus (1766–1834)
  - An Essay on the Principle of Population, the book in which Malthus propounded his theory
- Neo-Malthusian theory of Paul R. Ehrlich (born 1932) and others
- Theory of demographic transition by Warren Thompson (1887–1973)

== See also ==
- Demography
- Population
- Population growth
- Population bottleneck
- Population ecology
