= Malthusian growth model =

Exponential growth based on a constant rate

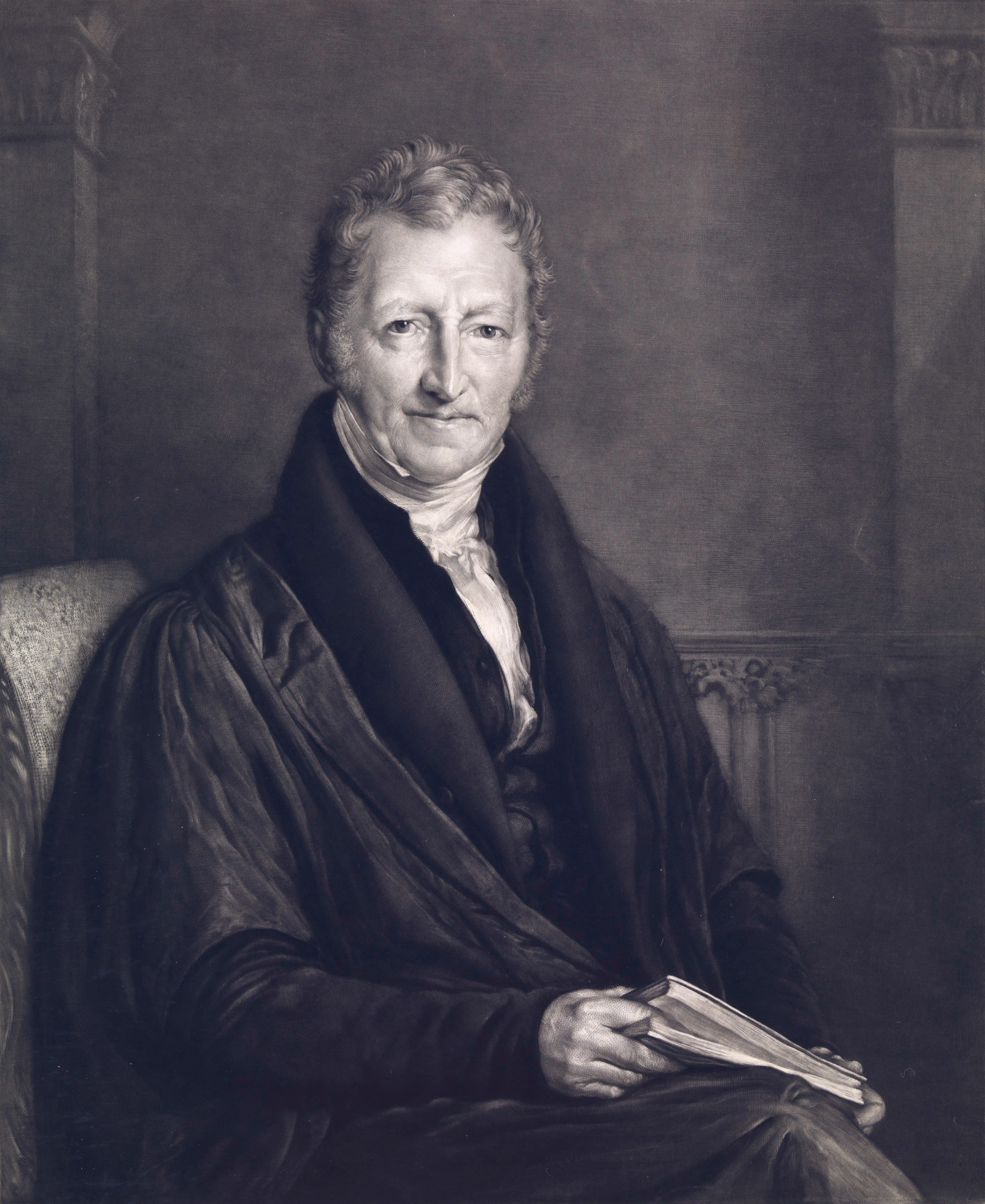
English priest, economist and scholar Thomas Robert Malthus, after whom the Malthusian growth model is named

A Malthusian growth model, sometimes called a simple exponential growth model, is essentially exponential growth based on the idea of the function being proportional to the speed to which the function grows. The model is named after Thomas Robert Malthus, who wrote An Essay on the Principle of Population (1798), one of the earliest and most influential books on population.

Malthusian models have the following form:

$$P(t) = P_0e^{rt}$$

where

- P_{0} = P(0) is the initial population size,
- r = the population growth rate, which Ronald Fisher called the Malthusian parameter of population growth in The Genetical Theory of Natural Selection, and Alfred J. Lotka called the intrinsic rate of increase,
- t = time.

The model can also be written in the form of a differential equation:

$$\frac{dP}{dt} = rP$$

with initial condition: P(0)= P_{0}

This model is often referred to as the exponential law. It is widely regarded in the field of population ecology as the first principle of population dynamics, with Malthus as the founder. The exponential law is therefore also sometimes referred to as the Malthusian law. By now, it is a widely accepted view to analogize Malthusian growth in ecology to Newton's first law of motion in physics.

Malthus wrote that all life forms, including humans, have a propensity to exponential population growth when resources are abundant but that actual growth is limited by available resources:

"Through the animal and vegetable kingdoms, nature has scattered the seeds of life abroad with the most profuse and liberal hand. ... The germs of existence contained in this spot of earth, with ample food, and ample room to expand in, would fill millions of worlds in the course of a few thousand years. Necessity, that imperious all pervading law of nature, restrains them within the prescribed bounds. The race of plants, and the race of animals shrink under this great restrictive law. And the race of man cannot, by any efforts of reason, escape from it. Among plants and animals its effects are waste of seed, sickness, and premature death. Among mankind, misery and vice. "

— Thomas Malthus, 1798. An Essay on the Principle of Population. Chapter I.

A model of population growth bounded by resource limitations was developed by Pierre Francois Verhulst in 1838, after he had read Malthus' essay. Verhulst named the model a logistic function.

== See also ==
- Logistic function for the mathematical model used in Population dynamics that adjusts growth rate based on how close it is to the maximum a system can support
- Albert Allen Bartlett – a leading proponent of the Malthusian Growth Model
- Exogenous growth model – related growth model from economics
- Food race - a model which argues population size is predetermined by carrying capacity
- Growth theory – related ideas from economics
- Human overpopulation
- Irruptive growth – an extension of the Malthusian model accounting for population explosions and crashes
- Malthusian catastrophe
- Neo-malthusianism
- The Genetical Theory of Natural Selection
