= Observations Concerning the Increase of Mankind, Peopling of Countries, etc. =

Book by Benjamin Franklin

Observations concerning the Increase of Mankind, peopling of Countries, etc.
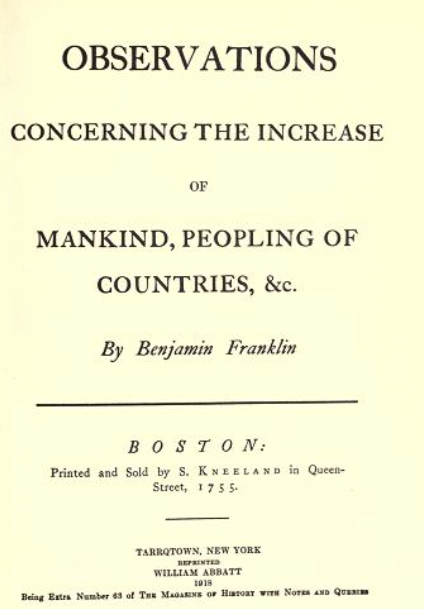
- Title page for Observations Concerning the Increase of Mankind, Peopling of Countries, etc. (1755 originally, this edition 1918)
- Author: Benjamin Franklin
- Language: English
- Genre: Essay
- Publication date: 1755 (originally written in 1751)
- Publication place: Thirteen Colonies

Observations Concerning the Increase of Mankind, Peopling of Countries, etc. is a short essay written in 1751 by American polymath Benjamin Franklin. It was circulated by Franklin in manuscript to his circle of friends, but in 1755 it was published as an addendum in a Boston pamphlet on another subject. It was reissued ten times during the next 15 years.

The essay examines population growth and its limits. Writing as, at the time, a loyal subject of the British Crown, Franklin argues that the British should increase their population and power by expanding across the Americas, taking the view that Europe is too crowded.

== Content ==
Franklin projected an exponential growth (doubling every 25 years) in the population of the Thirteen Colonies, so that in a century "the greatest Number of Englishmen will be on this Side of the Water", thereby increasing the power of England. As Englishmen they would share language, manners, and religion with their countrymen in England, thus extending English civilization and English rule substantially".

Franklin viewed the land in America as underutilized and available for the expansion of farming. This enabled the population to establish households at an earlier age and support larger families than was possible in Europe. The limit to expansion, reached in Europe but not America, is reached when the "crowding and interfering with each other's means of subsistence", an idea that would inspire Malthus.

Historian Walter Isaacson writes that Franklin's theory was empirically based on the population data during his day. Franklin's reasoning was essentially correct in that America's population continued to double every twenty years, surpassing England's population in the 1850s, and continued until the frontier era ended in the early 1900s. According to the United States Census, from 1750 to 1900, the population of colonial and continental America overall doubled every twenty five years, correctly aligning with Franklin's prediction.

Protectionist policies in 1750 led to the prohibition of ironworks in America. Franklin's essay argued against such policies by advancing the position that labor is more valued in self-owned farming given the availability of land in America. "No man continues long a laborer for others, but gets a plantation of his own." Growth in the colonies should increase demand for British manufacturing making protectionism unwise, an argument appreciated by Adam Smith.

Franklin argued that slavery diminished the nation, undermined the virtue of industry, and diminished the health and vitality of the nation. He argued that slavery was not as cost effective or productive as free labor.

== Influence ==
The work was cited by Adam Smith in his Wealth of Nations, in Ezra Stiles's Discourse on the Christian Union, and in Richard Price's Observations on Reversionary Payments. It also influenced David Hume, Samuel Johnson, and William Godwin. The notion of the population doubling every 25 years influenced Thomas Malthus, who quotes paragraph 22 of the essay, with attribution, in his 1802 work An Essay on the Principle of Population. Through Malthus, the essay is said to have influenced Charles Darwin. Conway Zirkle has noted that "Franklin is really the source of Darwin's inspiration, for he gave Malthus the clue to the theory of population we now call Malthusian, and Malthus... gave Darwin the clue which led to the discovery of natural selection."

== Anti-German Sentiment ==
While the essay was an important contribution to economics and population growth, recent attention has focused on the final two paragraphs.

Franklin was alarmed by the influx of German immigrants to Pennsylvania. The German immigrants were lacking in a liberal political tradition, the English language, and Anglo-American culture. In Paragraph 23 of the essay, Franklin wrote "why should the Palatine boors be suffered to swarm into our settlements, and by herding together establish their languages and manners to the exclusion of ours? Why should Pennsylvania, founded by the English, become a colony of Aliens, who will shortly be so numerous as to Germanize us instead of our Anglifying them, and will never adopt our language or customs, any more than they can acquire our complexion?"

Trimbur finds that Franklin's main concern over the growth of unassimilated Germans is the threat to Anglo-American culture and the English language. This becomes racial when Franklin concocts "categories of his own invention". Franklin favored immigration of Anglo-Saxons", who, according to Ormond Seavey, he identifies as the only "White people" among the various peoples of the world— although such an idea would have been highly unusual at the time, and Franklin never mentions race at all, but "complexion", nor does he deny that Germans belong to the white race. Nonetheless, his views have been condemned as racist in more recent literature, or more precisely, xenophobic. Gordon S. Wood and others note that Franklin viewed this kind of bias as universal: Franklin ends the section with "But perhaps I am partial to the complexion of my Country, for such kind of partiality is natural to Mankind."

Recognizing the potential offense that these comments might give, Franklin deleted the final paragraph from later editions of the essay, but his derogatory remarks about the Germans were picked up and used against him by his political enemies in Philadelphia, leading to a decline in support among the Pennsylvania Dutch. Partly as a result, he was defeated in the October 1764 election to the Pennsylvania Provincial Assembly. Franklin funded education and charitable institutions to settle and assimilate German immigrants and would in time regain their good will.
