= Al-Jahiz =

Arabic writer (776–869)

al-Jahiz
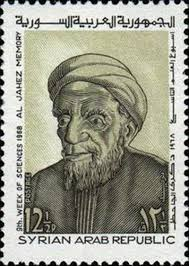
- Syrian stamp of al-Jahiz from 1968
- Born: Abū ʿUthman ʿAmr ibn Baḥr al-Kinānī al-Baṣrī; 776; Basra, Abbasid Caliphate
- Died: December 868/January 869 (aged 92-93); Basra, Abbasid Caliphate

Philosophical work
- Era: Islamic Golden Age/Medieval era
- Region: Islamic Philosophy
- School: Aristotelianism
- Main interests: Arabic literature, Biology, Trivium, Islamic studies, Islamic theology

Religious life
- Religion: Islam
- Denomination: Mu'tazila

Abu Uthman Amr ibn Bahr al-Kinani al-Basri (Arabic: أبو عثمان عمرو بن بحر الكناني البصري, romanized: Abū ʿUthman ʿAmr ibn Baḥr al-Kinānī al-Baṣrī; c. 776–868/869), commonly known as al-Jahiz (Arabic: الجاحظ, romanized: al-Jāḥiẓ, lit. 'the bug eyed', [al.dʒaː.ħɪðˤ]), was a Muslim theologian, intellectual, and litterateur known for his Arabic prose works. A polymath who lived during the Abbasid Caliphate, he was the author of works of literature (including theory and criticism), theology, zoology, philosophy, grammar, dialectics, rhetoric, philology, linguistics, and politico-religious polemics. His extensive zoological work has been credited with describing principles related to natural selection, ethology, and the functions of an ecosystem.

From about 815 CE, he rose to become one of the literary figures around the Abbasid caliph al-Ma'mun (r. 813–833 CE). Although he held no official posts, he received funding from several Abbasid prime ministers, while also working as a scribe and a teacher. Al-Jahiz was part of the rationalist Mu'tazilite school of theology supported by al-Ma'mun and his two successors, Al-Mu'tasim (r. 833–842 CE) and Al-Wathiq (r. 842–847 CE).

Ibn al-Nadim lists nearly 140 titles attributed to al-Jahiz, of which 75 are extant. The best known are Kitāb al-Ḥayawān (The Book of Animals), a seven-part compendium on an array of subjects with animals as their point of departure; Kitāb al-Bayān wa-l-tabyīn (The Book of Eloquence and Exposition), a wide-ranging work on human communication; and Kitāb al-Bukhalāʾ (The Book of Misers), a collection of anecdotes on stinginess. Known for his significant engagement with religious and scholarly texts, al-Jahiz was one of the earliest Muslims to make use of biblical material in Arabic translation. Tradition claims that he was smothered to death when a vast number of books fell over him.

== Life ==
The actual name of al-Jahiz was Abū ʿUthman ʿAmr ibn Bahr ibn Maḥbūb. His grandfather, Maḥbūb, was a protégé or mawali of ‘Amr ibn Qal‘ al-Kinānī, who was from Arab Banu Kinanah tribe. (Note: The ancestor of ‘Amr ibn Qal‘ was Abū al-Qallamas; the first of the Nasāh of the Banū Kināna who were overseers of observance of the religious holy months, when warfare was forbidden. His genealogy has been reported as ‘Amr ibn Qal‘ al-Kinānī, then al-Fuqaymī, a.k.a. ‘Amr ibn Qal‘ al-Kinānī al-Fuqaymī in an akhbār cited by al-Anbārī. Kinānī and Fuqaymī refer to the tribes of Kināna and Fuqaym. ‘Amr ibn Qal‘s ancestor was one of the Nasah (Nasa’ah).) Not much is known about al-Jāḥiẓ's early life, but his family was very poor. Born in Basra early in 160/February 776, he asserted in a book he wrote that he was a member of the Banu Kinanah. He has been called an Arab of east African descent. However, the grandfather of al-Jāḥiẓ was reportedly a Black jammāl (cameleer)—or ḥammāl (porter); the manuscripts differ—of ‘Amr ibn Qal‘ named Maḥbūb, nicknamed Fazārah, or Fazārah was his maternal grandfather, and Maḥbūb his paternal. The names may however have been confused. His nephew also reported that al-Jāḥiẓ's grandfather was a black cameleer. In the early Islamic Arabia, the designation of Black (Arabic: السودان "as-swadan") was used to describe people like Zuṭṭ and Zanj, and based on this, several scholars have stated that al-Jahiz descended from one of these black communities, with some even suggesting that he was possibly of African descent.

He sold fish along one of the canals in Basra to help his family. Financial difficulties, however, did not stop al-Jāḥiẓ from continuously seeking knowledge. He used to gather with a group of other youths at Basra's main mosque, where they would discuss different scientific subjects. During the cultural and intellectual revolution under the Abbasid Caliphate books became readily available, and learning accessible. Al-Jāḥiẓ studied philology, lexicography and poetry from among the most learned scholars at the School of Basra, where he attended the lectures of Abū Ubaydah, al-Aṣma’ī, Sa'īd ibn Aws al-Anṣārī and studied ilm an-naḥw (علم النحو, i.e., syntax) with Akhfash al-Awsaṭ (al-Akhfash Abī al-Ḥasan). Over a twenty-five-year span studying, al-Jāḥiẓ acquired a considerable knowledge of Arabic poetry, Arabic philology, pre-Islamic Arab history, the Qur'an and the Hadiths. He read translated books on Greek sciences and Hellenistic philosophy, especially that of the Greek philosopher Aristotle. Al-Jahiz was also critical of those who followed the Hadiths of Abu Hurayra, referring to his Hadithist opponents as al-nabita ("the contemptible").

Al-Jāḥiẓ died 250 [A.D. 869], during the caliphate of al-Mu‘tazz. Al-Nadīm reports that al-Jāḥiẓ said he was about the same age as Abū Nuwās (Note: Abū Nuwās al-Ḥasan ibn Hāni’ (d. 810), licentious poet and court companion of Hārūn al-Rashīd.) and older than al-Jammāz. (Note: al-Jammāz Muḥammad ibn ‘Amr, Abū ‘Abd Allāh (d. 868/869) a satirist and storyteller at the court of al-Mutawakkil)

== Career ==
While still in Basra, al-Jāḥiẓ wrote an article about the institution of the Caliphate. This is said to have been the beginning of his career as a writer, which would become his sole source of living. It is said that his mother once offered him a tray full of notebooks and told him he would earn his living from writing. He went on to write two hundred books in his lifetime on a variety of subjects, including on the Qur'an, Arabic grammar, zoology, poetry, lexicography, and rhetoric. Al-Jāḥiẓ was also one of the first Arabic writers to suggest a complete overhaul of the language's grammatical system, though this would not be undertaken until his fellow linguist Ibn Maḍāʾ took up the matter two hundred years later.

Al-Nadīm cited this passage from a book of al-Jāḥiẓ:

When I was writing these two books, about the creation of the Qur’ān, which was the tenet given importance and honour by the Commander of the Faithful, (Note: Probably the Caliph al-Ma’mūn, who made a special point of the doctrine of the creation of the Qur’ān. Al-Jāḥiẓ wrote numerous books about the caliphs, and which two books he refers to is unknown.) and another about superiority in connection with the Banū Hāshim, the ‘Abd Shams, and Makhzūm. (Note: Dodge notes that al-Jāḥiẓ’s praise for the ‘Abbāsid lineage, and promotion of their ancestors, the Banū Hāshim, over the ‘Abd Shams, ancestors of the Umayyads, and the Banū Makhzūm, is evidentially political expedience.) What was my due but to sit above the Simakān, Spica and Arcturus, or on top of the ‘Ayyūq, (Note: The Simakān were two stars: al-Simāk al-A‘zal or Spica, and al-Simāk al-Rāmiḥ or Arcturus. The ‘Ayyūq was either Aldebaran in the constellation of Taurus, or else Capella.) or to deal with red sulphur, or to conduct the ‘Anqā by her leading string to the Greatest King. (Note: The ‘Anqā was a fabled bird, also called Simurgh, that reigned as queen on Mount Qāf. The Ṣūfīs sometimes used the bird as an allegorical symbol of divine truth, so that the “Greatest King” probably refers to God.)

Al-Jāḥiẓ moved to Baghdad, then the capital of the Abbasid Caliphate, in 816 AD, because the caliphs encouraged scientists and scholars and had just founded the library of the Bayt al-Ḥikmah. But al-Nadim suspected al-Jāḥiẓ's claim that the caliph al-Ma’mūn had praised his books on the imamate and the caliphate, for his eloquent phraseology, and use of market-place speech, and that of the elite and of the kings, was exaggerated self-glorification and doubted that al-Ma’mūn could have spoken these words. (Note: Bayard Dodge in his editorial notes that he books about the caliphate undoubtedly tried to prove that it was the ‘Abbāsid caliphs who had the divine right to rule the Islamic theocracy and that al-Jāḥiẓ had put these words into the caliph’s mouth in an attempt to boast of his erudition and clarity of style.) Al-Jāḥiẓ was said to have admired the eloquent literary style of the director of the library, Sahl ibn Hārūn (d. 859/860) and quoted his works. Because of the caliphs' patronage and his eagerness to establish himself and reach a wider audience, al-Jāḥiẓ stayed in Baghdad.

Al-Nadīm gives two versions (Note: Compare “al-Fihrist” (ed. Dodge, 1970), Ch. III, §.2, near n. 12; Ch. V, §.1.) of an anecdote which differ in their source: his first source is Abū Hiffān (Note: Abū Hiffān 'Abd Allāh ibn Aḥmad ibn Ḥarb al-Mihzamī was a secretary and poet who died in Baghdād in 871.) and his second is the grammarian al-Mubarrad,—and retells the story of al-Jāḥiẓ's reputation for being one of the three great bibliophiles and scholars—the two others being al-Fatḥ ibn Khāqān and judge Ismā’īl ibn Isḥāq (Note: Ismā’īl ibn Isḥāq ibn Ismā’īl ibn Ḥammād, al-Qāḍī (d. 895/896) a jurist of Baṣrah who became a judge at Baghdād.)—such that “whenever a book came into the hand of al-Jāḥiẓ he read through it, wherever he happened to be. He even used to rent the shops of al-warrāqūn (Note: A copiest of MSS, or stationer, or bookshop owner. Bookshops were often meeting places for scholarly debate.) for study.”

Al-Jāḥiẓ replaced Ibrāhīm ibn al-‘Abbās al-Ṣūlī in the government secretariat of al-Ma’mūn but left after just three days. Later at Samarra he wrote a huge number of his books. The caliph al-Ma'mun wanted al-Jāḥiẓ to teach his children, but then changed his mind when his children were frightened by al-Jāḥiẓ's boggle-eyes (جاحظ العينين). This is said to be the origin of his nickname. He enjoyed the patronage of al-Fath ibn Khaqan, the bibliophile boon companion of Caliph al-Mutawakkil, but after his murder in December 861 he left Samarra for his native Basra, where he lived on his estate with his “concubine, her maid, a manservant, and a donkey.”

== Selected books ==
=== Kitāb al-Ḥayawān (كتاب الحيوان) 'Book of the Animal' ===
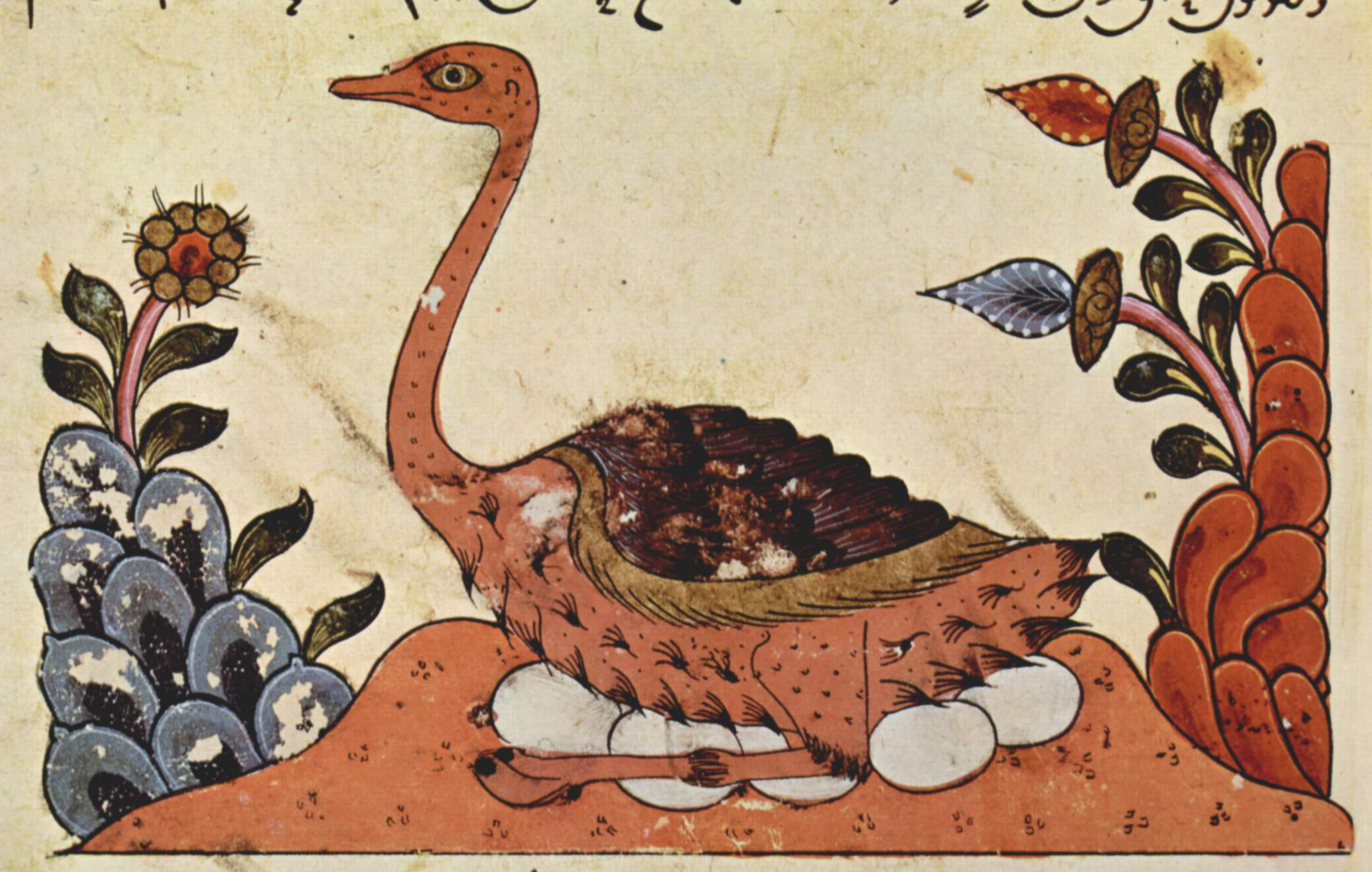
A page from a reproduction of al-Jāḥiẓ's Kitāb al-Hayawān depicting an ostrich (Struthio camelus) in a nest with eggs. Basra.

Kitāb al-Ḥayawān is an extensive zoological encyclopedia in seven volumes (Note: Al-Fihrist gives a list of the first and last sentences of each section of the Kitāb al-Ḥayawān.) consisting of anecdotes, proverbs, and descriptions of over 350 animal species, including in-depth analyses of their ecosystems and behaviors. It was composed in honour of Muḥammad ibn ‘Abd al-Mālik al-Zayyāt, who paid him five thousand gold coins. The 11th-century scholar al-Khatib al-Baghdadi dismissed it as "little more than a plagiarism" of Aristotle's Kitāb al-Hayawān – a charge of plagiarism was levelled against Aristotle himself with regard to a certain "Asclepiades of Pergamum". Later scholars have noted that there was only a limited Aristotelian influence in al-Jāḥiẓ's work, and that al-Baghdadi may have been unacquainted with Aristotle's work.

Conway Zirkle, writing about the history of natural selection science in 1941, said that an excerpt from this work was the only relevant passage he had found from an Arabian scholar. He provided a quotation describing the struggle for existence, citing a Spanish translation of this work:

The rat goes out for its food, and is clever in getting it, for it eats all animals inferior to it in strength", and in turn, it "has to avoid snakes and birds and serpents of prey, who look for it in order to devour it" and are stronger than the rat. Mosquitos "know instinctively that blood is the thing which makes them live" and when they see an animal, "they know that the skin has been fashioned to serve them as food". In turn, flies hunt the mosquito "which is the food that they like best", and predators eat the flies. "All animals, in short, can not exist without food, neither can the hunting animal escape being hunted in his turn. Every weak animal devours those weaker than itself. Strong animals cannot escape being devoured by other animals stronger than they. And in this respect, men do not differ from animals, some with respect to others, although they do not arrive at the same extremes. In short, God has disposed some human beings as a cause of life for others, and likewise, he has disposed the latter as a cause of the death of the former."

According to Frank Edgerton (2002), the claim made by some authors that al-Jahiz was an early evolutionist is "unconvincing", but the narrower claim that Jahiz "recognized the effect of environmental factors on animal life" seems valid. Rebecca Stott (2013) writes of al-Jahiz's work:

Jahiz was not concerned with argument or theorizing. He was concerned with witnessing; he promoted the pleasures and fascinations of close looking and told his readers that there was nothing more important than this. ... Here and there amid the close looking there are visions, glimpses of brilliant insight and perception about natural laws, but the overt purpose of Living beings was to persuade the reader to fulfil his moral obligation to God, an obligation enjoined by the Qu'ran: to look closely and search for understanding. ... If certain historians have claimed that Jahiz wrote about evolution a thousand years before Darwin and that he discovered natural selection, they have misunderstood. Jahiz was not trying to work out how the world began or how species had come to be. He believed that God had done the making and that he had done it brilliantly. He took divine creation and intelligent design for granted. … There was, for him, no other possible explanation. ... What is striking, however, about Jahiz’s portrait of nature in Living Beings is his vision of interconnectedness, his repeated images of nets and webs. He certainly saw ecosystems, as we would call them now, in the natural world. He also understood what we might call the survival of the fittest.

Like Aristotle, al-Jahiz believed in spontaneous generation. He frequently used metaphors of webs and nets to express the interconnectedness of the natural world.

=== Kitāb al-Bukhalā’ (البُخلاء) 'The Book of Misers' (a.k.a. 'Avarice and the Avaricious') ===
Kitāb al-Bukhalā’ is a collection of stories about the greedy. Humorous and satirical, it is the best example of al-Jāḥiẓ' prose style. Al-Jāḥiẓ ridicules schoolmasters, beggars, singers and scribes for their greedy behavior. Many of the stories continue to be reprinted in magazines throughout the Arabic-speaking world. The book is considered one of the best works of al-Jāḥiẓ. The book has two English translations: one by Robert Bertram Serjeant titled The Book of Misers, and another by Jim Colville titled Avarice and the Avaricious. Editions: Arabic (al-Ḥājirī, Cairo, 1958); Arabic text, French preface. Le Livre des avares. (Pellat. Paris, 1951)

=== Kitāb al-Bayān wa-al-Tabyīn 'The Book of Eloquence and Demonstration' ===
al-Bayan wa al-Tabyin was one of al-Jāḥiẓ's later works, in which he wrote on epiphanies, rhetorical speeches, sectarian leaders, and princes. The book is considered to have started Arabic literary theory in a formal, systemic fashion. Al-Jāḥiẓ's defining of eloquence as the ability of the speaker to deliver an effective message while maintaining it as brief or elaborate at will was widely accepted by later Arabic literary critics.

=== Al-Radd ʿalā al-Naṣārā ===
Al-Jahiz was one of the earliest Muslims to make use of biblical material in Arabic translation. In his book titled "Al-Radd ʿalā al-Naṣārā", he asserted that the text of the extant Hebrew Bible was trustworthy and a more reliable source than the Christian Gospels. He also discredited Jewish translations of the Old Testament as a source for Christian arguments that Jesus was the literal Son of God, and asserted that the anthropomorphizing content of existing Jewish versions resulted from poor translation.

=== Fakhr al-Sūdān ala al-Bīḍān (فَخْر السُودان على البيضان) 'The Boast of blacks Over the Whites' ===
This book is composed as a debate between black people and white people as to which group is superior. Al-Jāḥiẓ mentions that Blacks have an oratory and eloquence of their own culture and language.

==== Editions and translations ====
- al-Jahiz, Fakhr El Soudan Ala Al Bidhan (Beirut: Dar al-Guiel, 1991).
- al-Jāḥiẓ, “The Boasts of the Blacks Over the Whites,” trans. Tarif Khalidi, Islamic Quarterly, 25, no. 1 (1981): 3–51.

== On the Zanj ("Swahili coast") ==
Concerning the Zanj, he wrote:

Everybody agrees that there is no people on earth in whom generosity is as universally well developed as the Zanj. These people have a natural talent for dancing to the rhythm of the tambourine, without needing to learn it. There are no better singers anywhere in the world, no people more polished and eloquent, and no people less given to insulting language. No other nation can surpass them in bodily strength and physical toughness. One of them will lift huge blocks and carry heavy loads that would be beyond the strength of most Bedouins or members of other races. They are courageous, energetic, and generous, which are the virtues of nobility, and also good-tempered and with little propensity to evil. They are always cheerful, smiling, and devoid of malice, which is a sign of noble character.

The Zanj say that God did not make them black to disfigure them; rather it is their environment that made them so. The best evidence of this is that there are black tribes among the Arabs, such as the Banu Sulaim bin Mansur, and that all the peoples settled in the Harra, besides the Banu Sulaim are black. These tribes take slaves from among the Ashban to mind their flocks and for irrigation work, manual labor, and domestic service, and their wives from among the Byzantines; and yet it takes less than three generations for the Harra to give them all the complexion of the Banu Sulaim. This Harra is such that the gazelles, ostriches, insects, wolves, foxes, sheep, asses, horses and birds that live there are all black. White and black are the results of environment, the natural properties of water and soil, distance from the sun, and intensity of heat. There is no question of metamorphosis, or of punishment, disfigurement or favor meted out by Allah. Besides, the land of the Banu Sulaim has much in common with the land of the Turks, where the camels, beasts of burden, and everything belonging to these people is similar in appearance: everything of theirs has a Turkish look.

== Mu‘tazilī theological debate ==
Al-Jāḥiẓ intervened in a theological dispute between two Mu’tazilītes, and defended Abū al-Hudhayl al-'Allaf against the criticism of Bishr ibn al-Mu‘tamir. Another Mu‘tazilite theologian, Ja‘far ibn Mubashshir, (Note: Ja‘far ibn Mubashshir al-Thaqafī, Abū Muḥammad, (d. 848/49) a Mu‘tazilah of Baghdād.) wrote a “refutation of al-Jāḥiẓ”.

According to the Encyclopædia Britannica, he was "part of the rationalist Mu’tazilite school of theology supported by the caliph al-Maʾmūn and his successor. When Muʿtazilism was abandoned by the caliph al-Mutawakkil, al-Jāḥiẓ remained in favour by writing essays such as Manāqib at-turk (Eng. trans., “Exploits of the Turks”).

== Death ==
Al-Jāḥiẓ returned to Basra with hemiplegia after spending more than fifty years in Baghdad. He died in Basra in the Arabic month of Muharram in AH 255/December 868 – January 869 AD. His exact cause of death is not clear, but a popular assumption is that al-Jāḥiẓ died in his private library after one of many large piles of books fell on him, killing him instantly.

== See also ==
- Shu'ubiyya
- Ajam
- Al-Jāhiz (crater)
- List of Arab scientists and scholars
