= Lu Hsun (crater) =

Crater on Mercury

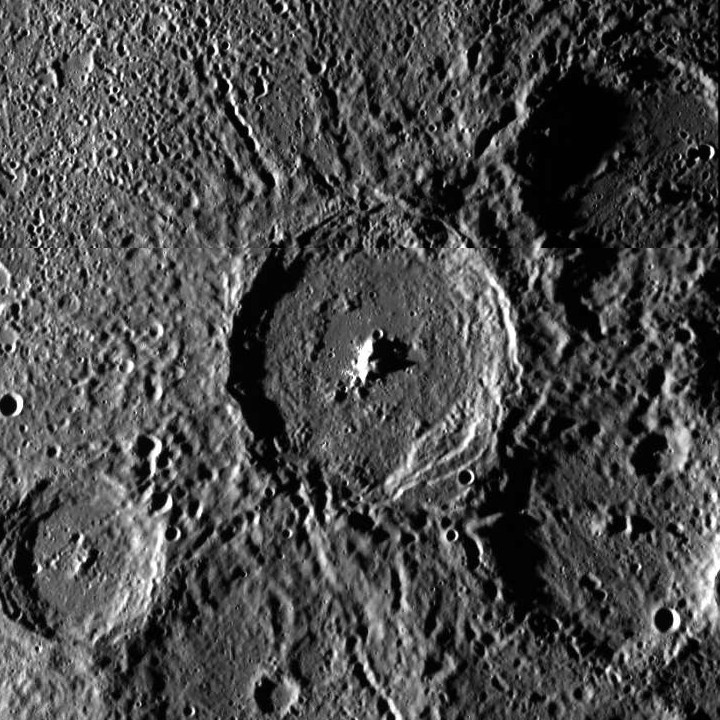
- MESSENGER WAC mosaic of Lu Hsun
- Feature type: Central-peak impact crater
- Location: Kuiper quadrangle, Mercury
- Coordinates: 0.01°S 23.76°W
- Diameter: 96.0 km (59.7 mi)
- Eponym: Lu Hsun

Lu Hsun is a crater on Mercury. It has a diameter of 98 kilometers. Its name was adopted by the International Astronomical Union (IAU) in 1976. Lu Hsun is named for the Chinese writer Lu Hsun, who lived from 1881 to 1936.

Hollows are present on and around the central peak complex.

Al-Jāhiz crater is northeast of Lu Hsun.

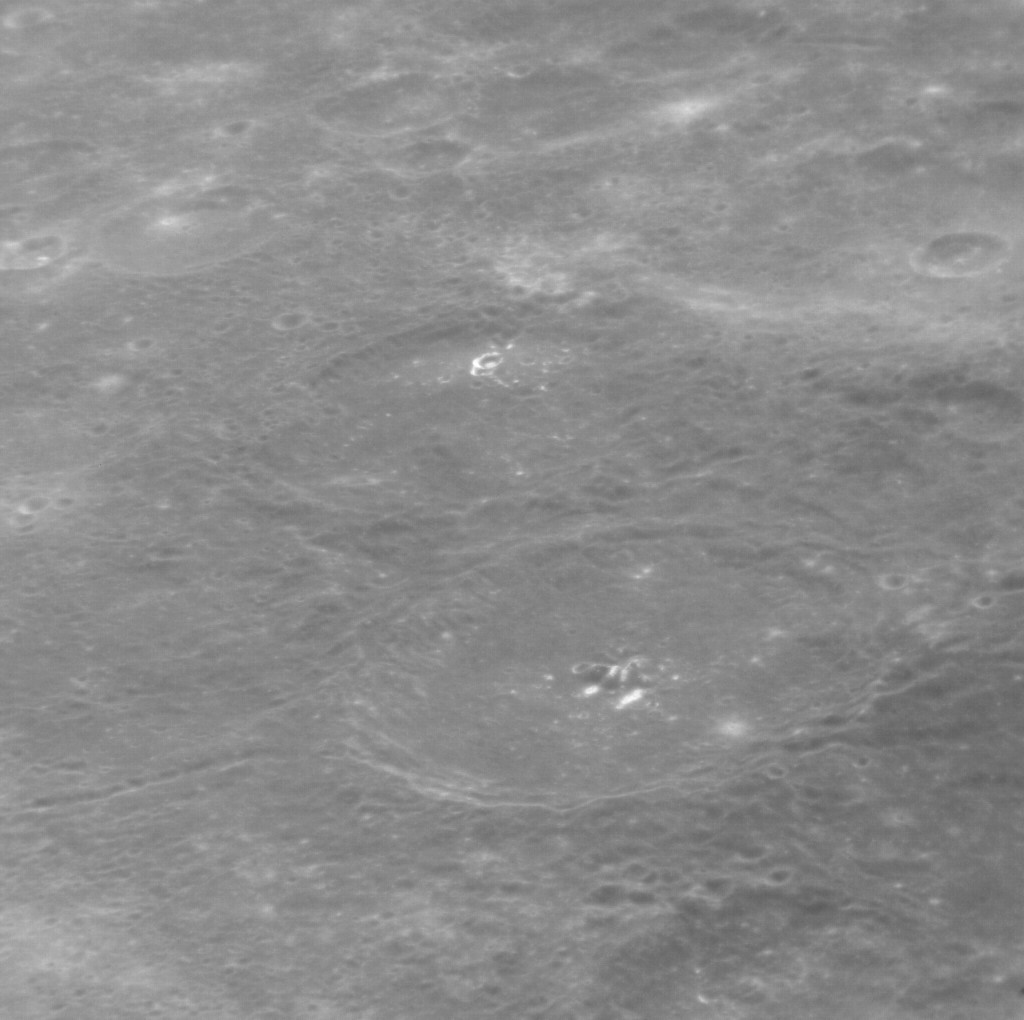
Oblique view of Lu Hsun crater (lower right), with bright hollows at the central peak

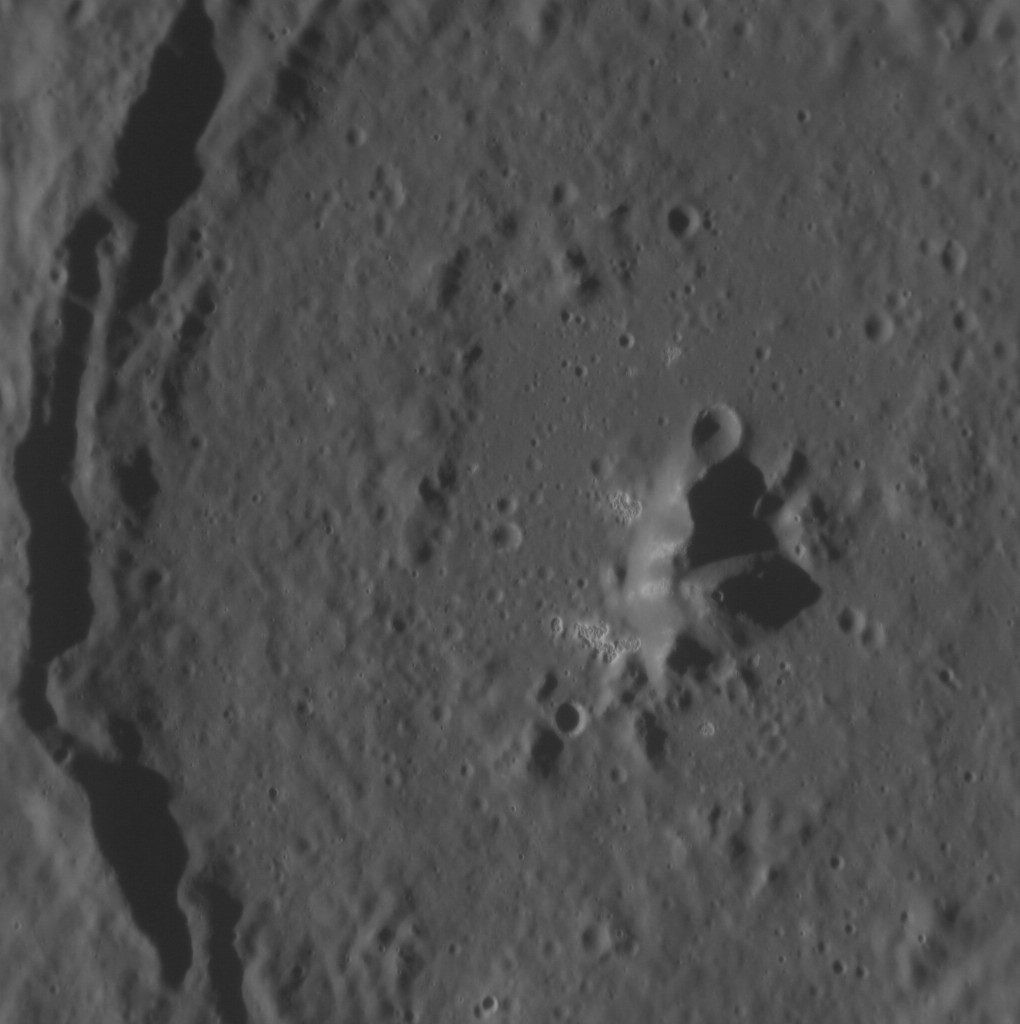
MESSENGER NAC image of central Lu Hsun
