= An Essay on the Principle of Population =

Treatise by Thomas Malthus

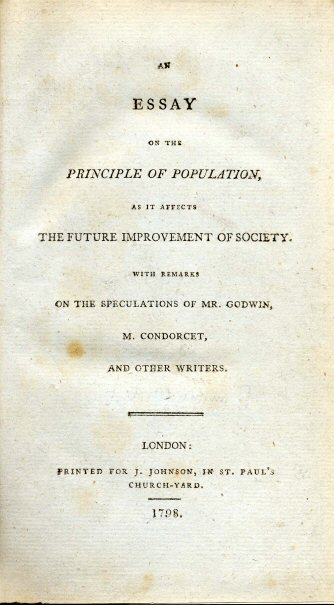
- Title page of the original edition of 1798
- Author: Thomas Robert Malthus
- Language: English
- Genre: Essay
- Publisher: J. Johnson, London
- Publication date: 1798
- Publication place: England
- Text: An Essay on the Principle of Population at Wikisource

The book An Essay on the Principle of Population was first published anonymously in 1798, but the author was soon identified as Thomas Robert Malthus. The book warned of future difficulties, on an interpretation of the population increasing in geometric progression (so as to double every 25 years) while food production increased in an arithmetic progression, which would leave a difference resulting in the want of food and famine, unless birth rates decreased.

While it was not the first book on population, Malthus's book fuelled debate about the size of the population in Britain and contributed to the passing of the Census Act 1800. This Act enabled the holding of a national census in England, Wales and Scotland, starting in 1801 and continuing every ten years to the present. The book's 6th edition (1826) was independently cited as a key influence by both Charles Darwin and Alfred Russel Wallace in developing the theory of natural selection.

A key portion of the book was dedicated to what is now known as the Malthusian Law of Population. The theory claims that growing population rates contribute to a rising supply of labour and inevitably lowers wages. In essence, Malthus feared that continued population growth lends itself to poverty.

In 1803, Malthus published, under the same title, a heavily revised second edition of his work. His final version, the 6th edition, was published in 1826. In 1830, 32 years after the first edition, Malthus published a condensed version entitled A Summary View on the Principle of Population, which included responses to criticisms of the larger work.

== Overview ==
Between 1798 and 1826 Malthus published six editions of his famous treatise, updating each edition to incorporate new material, to address criticism, and to convey changes in his own perspectives on the subject. He wrote the original text in reaction to the optimism of his father and his father's associates (notably Rousseau) regarding the future improvement of society. Malthus also constructed his case as a specific response to writings of William Godwin (1756–1836) and of the Marquis de Condorcet (1743–1794).

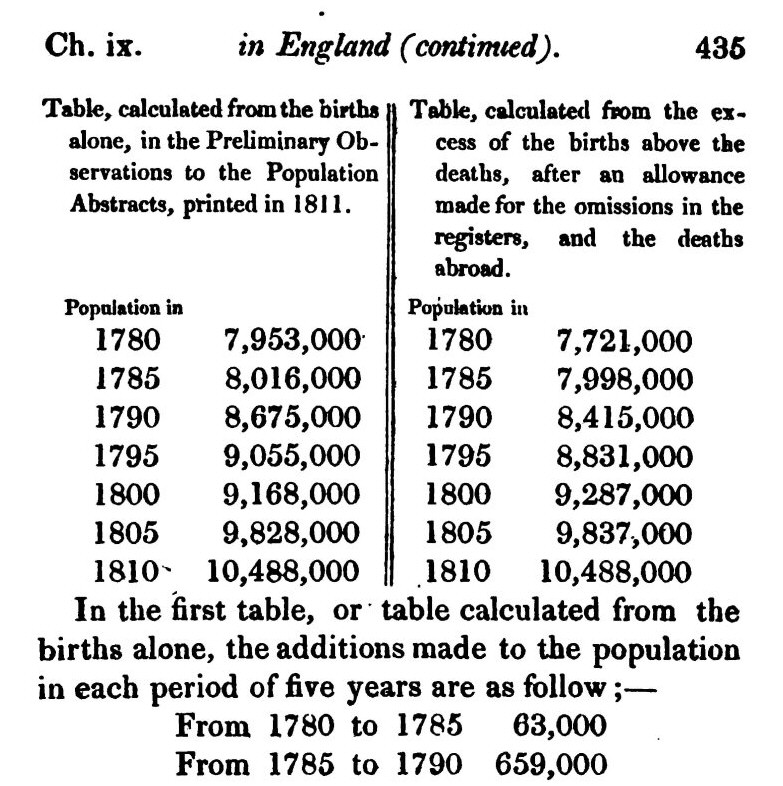
Part of Thomas Malthus's table of population growth in England 1780–1810, from his An Essay on the Principle of Population, 6th edition, 1826

Malthus regarded ideals of future improvement in the lot of humanity with scepticism, considering that throughout history a segment of every human population seemed relegated to poverty. He explained this phenomenon by arguing that population growth generally expanded in times and in regions of plenty until a relatively large size of population, relative to a more modest supply of primary resources, caused distress:

Yet in all societies, even those that are most vicious, the tendency to a virtuous attachment [i.e., marriage] is so strong, that there is a constant effort towards an increase of population. This constant effort as constantly tends to subject the lower classes of the society to distress and to prevent any great permanent amelioration of their condition.

— Malthus T.R. 1798. An Essay on the Principle of Population. Chapter II.

The way in which these effects are produced seems to be this. We will suppose the means of subsistence in any country just equal to the easy support of its inhabitants. The constant effort towards population... increases the number of people before the means of subsistence are increased. The food therefore which before supported seven millions must now be divided among seven millions and a half or eight millions. The poor consequently must live much worse, and many of them be reduced to severe distress. The number of labourers also being above the proportion of the work in the market, the price of labour must tend toward a decrease, while the price of provisions would at the same time tend to rise. The labourer therefore must work harder to earn the same as he did before. During this season of distress, the discouragements to marriage, and the difficulty of rearing a family are so great that population is at a stand. In the mean time the cheapness of labour, the plenty of labourers, and the necessity of an increased industry amongst them, encourage cultivators to employ more labour upon their land, to turn up fresh soil, and to manure and improve more completely what is already in tillage, till ultimately the means of subsistence become in the same proportion to the population as at the period from which we set out. The situation of the labourer being then again tolerably comfortable, the restraints to population are in some degree loosened, and the same retrograde and progressive movements with respect to happiness are repeated.

— Malthus T.R. 1798. An Essay on the Principle of Population. Chapter II, p. 19 in Oxford World's Classics reprint.

Malthus also saw that societies through history had experienced at one time or another epidemics, famines, or wars: events that masked the fundamental problem of populations overstretching their resource limitations:

The power of population is so superior to the power of the earth to produce subsistence for man, that premature death must in some shape or other visit the human race. The vices of mankind are active and able ministers of depopulation. They are the precursors in the great army of destruction, and often finish the dreadful work themselves. But should they fail in this war of extermination, sickly seasons, epidemics, pestilence, and plague advance in terrific array, and sweep off their thousands and tens of thousands. Should success be still incomplete, gigantic inevitable famine stalks in the rear, and with one mighty blow levels the population with the food of the world.

— Malthus T.R. 1798. An Essay on the Principle of Population. Chapter VII, p. 44 in Oxford World's Classics reprint.

The rapid increase in the global population of the past century exemplifies Malthus's predicted population patterns; it also appears to describe socio-demographic dynamics of complex pre-industrial societies. These findings are the basis for neo-Malthusian modern mathematical models of long-term historical dynamics.

=== Proposed solutions ===
Malthus argued that two types of checks hold population within resource limits: The first, or preventive check to lower birth rates and The second, or positive check to permit higher mortality rates. This second check "represses an increase which is already begun" but by being "confined chiefly, though not perhaps solely, to the lowest orders of society". The preventive checks could involve birth control, postponement of marriage, and celibacy while the positive checks could involve hunger, disease and war.

Malthus highlighted the difference between governmentally instituted welfare and privately supported benevolence and proposed a gradual abolition of poor laws which he thought would be accompanied by a mitigation of the circumstances within which people would need relief and by privately supported benevolence supporting those in distress. He reasoned that poor relief acted against the longer-term interests of the poor by raising the price of commodities and undermining the independence and resilience of the peasant. In other words, the poor laws tended to "create the poor which they maintain."

It offended Malthus that critics claimed he lacked a caring attitude toward the situation of the poor. In the 1798 edition his concern for the poor shows in passages such as the following:

Nothing is so common as to hear of encouragements that ought to be given to population. If the tendency of mankind to increase be so great as I have represented it to be, it may appear strange that this increase does not come when it is thus repeatedly called for. The true reason is, that the demand for a greater population is made without preparing the funds necessary to support it. Increase the demand for agricultural labour by promoting cultivation, and with it consequently increase the produce of the country, and ameliorate the condition of the labourer, and no apprehensions whatever need be entertained of the proportional increase of population. An attempt to effect this purpose in any other way is vicious, cruel, and tyrannical, and in any state of tolerable freedom cannot therefore succeed.

In an addition to the 1817 edition he wrote:

I have written a chapter expressly on the practical direction of our charity; and in detached passages elsewhere have paid a just tribute to the exalted virtue of benevolence. To those who have read these parts of my work, and have attended to the general tone and spirit of the whole, I willingly appeal, if they are but tolerably candid, against these charges ... which intimate that I would root out the virtues of charity and benevolence without regard to the exaltation which they bestow on the moral dignity of our nature...

Some, such as William Farr and Karl Marx, argued that Malthus did not fully recognize the human capacity to increase food supply. On this subject, however, Malthus had written: "The main peculiarity which distinguishes man from other animals, in the means of his support, is the power which he possesses of very greatly increasing these means."

He also commented on the notion that Francis Galton later called eugenics:

It does not... by any means seem impossible that by an attention to breed, a certain degree of improvement, similar to that among animals, might take place among men. Whether intellect could be communicated may be a matter of doubt; but size, strength, beauty, complexion, and perhaps longevity are in a degree transmissible... As the human race, however, could not be improved in this way without condemning all the bad specimens to celibacy, it is not probable that an attention to breed should ever become general.

— Malthus T.R. 1798. An Essay on the Principle of Population. Chapter IX, p. 72 in Oxford World's Classics reprint.

=== On religion ===
As a Christian and a clergyman, Malthus addressed the question of how an omnipotent and caring God could permit suffering. In the First Edition of his Essay (1798) Malthus reasoned that the constant threat of poverty and starvation served to teach the virtues of hard work and virtuous behaviour. "Had population and food increased in the same ratio, it is probable that man might never have emerged from the savage state," he wrote, adding further, "Evil exists in the world not to create despair, but activity." Similarly, Malthus believed that "the infinite variety of nature...is admirably adapted to further the high purpose of the creation and to produce the greatest possible quantity of good."

Nevertheless, although the threat of poverty could be understood to be a prod to motivate human industry, it was not God's will that man should suffer. Malthus wrote that mankind itself was solely to blame for human suffering:

I believe that it is the intention of the Creator that the earth should be replenished; but certainly with a healthy, virtuous and happy population, not an unhealthy, vicious and miserable one. And if, in endeavouring to obey the command to increase and multiply, we people it only with beings of this latter description and suffer accordingly, we have no right to impeach the justice of the command, but our irrational mode of executing it.

=== Theory of Mind ===
Malthus referred to the last two chapters of the Essay (1798) as his "theory of mind". These chapters contain a sophisticated - and heterodox - theory of mind, in which Malthus advocated for a naturalized conception of humans and mind. For Malthus mind arose out of matter and he emphasized this throughout the Essay, employing the phrases "matter into mind" and "mind out of matter" throughout. Bodily sensations power the whole mental apparatus, compelling the body into action:

The first great awakeners of the mind seem to be the wants of the body [...] They are the first stimulants that rouse the brain of infant man into sentient activity, and such seems to be the sluggishness of original matter that unless by a peculiar course of excitements other wants, equally powerful, are generated, these stimulants seem, even afterwards, to be necessary to continue that activity which they first awakened.

Malthus's theory of mind, therefore, posited that "matter is formed into mind by the impressions and stimulations of nature upon the body and the ensuing perpetual struggle to avoid pain and pleasure". This naturalized conception of mind was omitted from all subsequent editions which was most likely due to the fact that Malthus's theory of mind was singled out for critique.

=== Demographics, wages, and inflation ===
Malthus wrote of the relationship between population, real wages, and inflation. When the population of laborers grows faster than the production of food, real wages fall because the growing population causes the cost of living (i.e., the cost of food) to go up. Difficulties of raising a family eventually reduce the rate of population growth, until the falling population again leads to higher real wages:

A circumstance which has, perhaps, more than any other, contributed to conceal this oscillation from common view, is the difference between the nominal and real price of labour. It very rarely happens that the nominal price of labour universally falls; but we well know that it frequently remains the same, while the nominal price of provisions has been gradually rising. This, indeed, will generally be the case, if the increase of manufactures and commerce be sufficient to employ the new labourers that are thrown into the market, and to prevent the increased supply from lowering the money-price. But an increased number of labourers receiving the same money-wages will necessarily, by their competition, increase the money-price of corn. This is, in fact, a real fall in the price of labour; and, during this period, the condition of the lower classes of the community must be gradually growing worse. But the farmers and capitalists are growing rich from the real cheapness of labour. Their increasing capitals enable them to employ a greater number of men; and, as the population had probably suffered some check from the greater difficulty of supporting a family, the demand for labour, after a certain period, would be great in proportion to the supply, and its price would of course rise, if left to find its natural level; and thus the wages of labour, and consequently the condition of the lower classes of society, might have progressive and retrograde movements, though the price of labour might never nominally fall.

In later editions of his essay, Malthus clarified his view that if society relied on human misery to limit population growth, then sources of misery (e.g., hunger, disease, and war, termed by Malthus "positive checks on population") would inevitably afflict society, as would volatile economic cycles. On the other hand, "preventive checks" to population that limited birthrates, such as later marriages, could ensure a higher standard of living for all, while also increasing economic stability.

=== Editions and versions ===
- 1798: An Essay on the Principle of Population, as it affects the future improvement of society with remarks on the speculations of Mr. Godwin, M. Condorcet, and other writers.. Anonymously published.
- 1803: Second and much enlarged edition: An Essay on the Principle of Population; or, a view of its past and present effects on human happiness; with an enquiry into our prospects respecting the future removal or mitigation of the evils which it occasions. Authorship acknowledged.
- 1806, 1807, 1817 and 1826: editions 3–6, with relatively minor changes from the second edition.
- 1823: Malthus contributed the article on Population to the supplement of the Encyclopædia Britannica.
- 1830: Malthus had a long extract from the 1823 article reprinted as A summary view of the Principle of Population.

== 1st edition ==
The full title of the first edition of Malthus' essay was "An Essay on the Principle of Population, as it affects the Future Improvement of Society with remarks on the Speculations of Mr. Godwin, M. Condorcet, and Other Writers." The speculations and other writers are explained below.

William Godwin had published his utopian work Enquiry concerning Political Justice in 1793, with later editions in 1796 and 1798. Also, Of Avarice and Profusion (1797). Malthus' remarks on Godwin's work spans chapters 10 through 15 (inclusive) out of nineteen. Godwin responded with Of Population (1820).

The Marquis de Condorcet had published his utopian vision of social progress and the perfectibility of man Esquisse d'un Tableau Historique des Progres de l'Espirit Humain (Sketch for a Historical Picture of the Progress of the Human Mind) in 1794. Malthus' remarks on Condorcet's work spans chapters 8 and 9.

Malthus' essay was in response to these utopian visions, as he argued:

This natural inequality of the two powers, of population, and of production of the earth, and that great law of our nature which must constantly keep their effects equal, form the great difficulty that appears to me insurmountable in the way to the perfectibility of society.

The "other writers" included Robert Wallace, Adam Smith, Richard Price, and David Hume.

Malthus himself claimed:

The only authors from whose writings I had deduced the principle, which formed the main argument of the Essay, were Hume, Wallace, Adam Smith, and Dr. Price...

Chapters 1 and 2 outline Malthus' Principle of Population, and the unequal nature of food supply to population growth. The exponential nature of population growth is today known as the Malthusian growth model. This aspect of Malthus' Principle of Population, together with his assertion that food supply was subject to a linear growth model, would remain unchanged in future editions of his essay. Note that Malthus actually used the terms geometric and arithmetic, respectively.

Chapter 3 examines the overrun of the Roman empire by barbarians, due to population pressure. War as a check on population is examined.

Chapter 4 examines the current state of populousness of civilized nations (particularly Europe). Malthus criticises David Hume for a "probable error" in his "criteria that he proposes as assisting in an estimate of population."

Chapter 5 examines The Poor Laws of Pitt the Younger.

Chapter 6 examines the rapid growth of new colonies such as the former Thirteen Colonies of the United States of America.

Chapter 7 examines checks on population such as pestilence and famine.

Chapter 8 also examines a "probable error" by Wallace "that the difficulty arising from population is at a great distance."

Chapters 16 and 17 examine the causes of the wealth of states, including criticisms of Adam Smith and Richard Price. English wealth is compared with Chinese poverty.

Chapters 18 and 19 set out a theodicy to explain the problem of evil in terms of natural theology. This views the world as "a mighty process for awakening matter" in which the Supreme Being acting "according to general laws" created "wants of the body" as "necessary to create exertion" which forms "the reasoning faculty". In this way, the principle of population would "tend rather to promote, than impede the general purpose of Providence."

The 1st edition influenced writers of natural theology such as William Paley and Thomas Chalmers.

== 2nd to 6th editions ==
Following both widespread praise and criticism of his essay, Malthus revised his arguments and recognized other influences:

In the course of this enquiry I found that much more had been done than I had been aware of, when I first published the Essay. The poverty and misery arising from a too rapid increase of population had been distinctly seen, and the most violent remedies proposed, so long ago as the times of Plato and Aristotle. And of late years the subject has been treated in such a manner by some of the French Economists; occasionally by Montesquieu, and, among our own writers, by Dr. Franklin, Sir James Stewart, Mr. Arthur Young, and Mr. Townsend, as to create a natural surprise that it had not excited more of the public attention.

The 2nd edition, published in 1803 (with Malthus now clearly identified as the author), was entitled "An Essay on the Principle of Population; or, a View of its Past and Present Effects on Human Happiness; with an enquiry into our Prospects respecting the Future Removal or Mitigation of the Evils which it occasions."

Malthus advised that the 2nd edition "may be considered as a new work", and the subsequent editions were all minor revisions of the 2nd edition. These were published in 1806, 1807, 1817, and 1826.

By far the biggest change was in how the 2nd to 6th editions of the essay were structured, and the most copious and detailed evidence that Malthus presented, more than any previous such book on population. Essentially, for the first time, Malthus examined his own Principle of Population on a region-by-region basis of world population. The essay was organized in four books:

- Book I – Of the Checks to Population in the Less Civilized Parts of the World and in Past Times.
- Book II – Of the Checks To Population in the Different States of Modern Europe.
- Book III – Of the different Systems or Expedients which have been proposed or have prevailed in Society, as They affect the Evils arising from the Principle of Population.
- Book IV – Of our future Prospects respecting the Removal or Mitigation of the Evils arising from the Principle of Population.

Due in part to the highly influential nature of Malthus' work (see main article Thomas Malthus), this approach is regarded as pivotal in establishing the field of demography and even to him being regarded as its founding father.

The following controversial quote appears in the second edition:

A man who is born into a world already possessed, if he cannot get subsistence from his parents on whom he has a just demand, and if the society do not want his labour, has no claim of right to the smallest portion of food, and, in fact, has no business to be where he is. At nature's mighty feast there is no vacant cover for him. She tells him to be gone, and will quickly execute her own orders, if he does not work upon the compassion of some of her guests. If these guests get up and make room for him, other intruders immediately appear demanding the same favour. The report of a provision for all that come, fills the hall with numerous claimants. The order and harmony of the feast is disturbed, the plenty that before reigned is changed into scarcity; and the happiness of the guests is destroyed by the spectacle of misery and dependence in every part of the hall, and by the clamorous importunity of those, who are justly enraged at not finding the provision which they had been taught to expect. The guests learn too late their error, in counter-acting those strict orders to all intruders, issued by the great mistress of the feast, who, wishing that all guests should have plenty, and knowing she could not provide for unlimited numbers, humanely refused to admit fresh comers when her table was already full.

Ecologist Professor Garrett Hardin claims that the preceding passage inspired hostile reactions from many critics. The offending passage of Malthus' essay appeared in the 2nd edition only, as Malthus felt obliged to remove it.

From the 2nd edition onwards – in Book IV – Malthus advocated moral restraint as an additional, and voluntary, check on population. This included such measures as sexual abstinence and late marriage.

As noted by Professor Robert M. Young, Malthus dropped his chapters on natural theology from the 2nd edition onwards. Also, the essay became less of a personal response to Godwin and Condorcet.

== A Summary View ==
A Summary View on the Principle of Population was published in 1830. The author was identified as Rev. T.R. Malthus, A.M., F.R.S. Malthus wrote A Summary View for those who did not have the leisure to read the full essay and, as he put it, "to correct some of the misrepresentations which have gone abroad respecting two or three of the most important points of the Essay".

A Summary View ends with a defense of the Principle of Population against the charge that it "impeaches the goodness of the Deity, and is inconsistent with the letter and spirit of the scriptures".

Malthus died in 1834 leaving this as his final word on the Principle of Population.

== Other works that influenced Malthus ==
- Observations Concerning the Increase of Mankind, Peopling of Countries, etc. (1751) by Benjamin Franklin (1706–1790)
- Of the Populousness of Ancient Nations (1752) – David Hume (1711–76)
- A Dissertation on the Numbers of Mankind in Ancient and Modern Times (1753), Characteristics of the Present State of Great Britain (1758), and Various Prospects of Mankind, Nature and Providence (1761) – Robert Wallace (1697–1771)
- An Inquiry into the Nature and Causes of the Wealth of Nations (1776) – Adam Smith (1723–90)
- Essay on the Population of England from the Revolution to Present Time (1780), Evidence for a Future Period in the State of Mankind, with the Means and Duty of Promoting it (1787) – Richard Price (1723–1791).

== Reception, criticism, and legacy of Essay ==
=== Personalia ===
Malthus became subject to extreme personal criticism. People who knew nothing about his private life criticised him both for having no children and for having too many. In 1819, Shelley, berating Malthus as a priest, called him "a eunuch and a tyrant". Marx repeated the idea, adding that Malthus had taken the vow of celibacy, and called him "superficial", "a professional plagiarist", "the agent of the landed aristocracy", "a paid advocate" and "the principal enemy of the people".

In the 20th century an editor of the Everyman edition of Malthus claimed that Malthus had practised population control by begetting eleven girls. In fact, Malthus fathered two daughters and one son. Garrett Hardin provides an overview of such personal comments.

=== Early influence ===
The position held by Malthus as professor at the Haileybury training college, to his death in 1834, gave his theories some influence over Company rule in India. According to Peterson, William Pitt the Younger (in office: 1783–1801 and 1804–1806), on reading the work of Malthus, withdrew a Bill he had introduced that called for the extension of Poor Relief. Concerns about Malthus's theory helped promote the idea of a national population census in the UK. Government official John Rickman became instrumental in the carrying out of the first modern British census in 1801, under Pitt's administration. In the 1830s Malthus's writings strongly influenced Whig reforms which overturned Tory paternalism and brought in the Poor Law Amendment Act 1834.

Malthus convinced most economists that even while high fertility might increase the gross output, it tended to reduce output per capita. David Ricardo and Alfred Marshall admired Malthus, and so came under his influence. Early converts to his population theory included William Paley. Despite Malthus's opposition to contraception, his work exercised a strong influence on Francis Place (1771–1854), whose neo-Malthusian movement became the first to advocate contraception. Place published his Illustrations and Proofs of the Principles of Population in 1822.

=== Early responses in the Malthusian controversy ===
In Ireland, where (writing to Ricardo in 1817) Malthus proposed that "to give full effect to the natural resources of the country a great part of the population should be swept from the soil", an early "refutation" of the Essay on Population was offered by George Ensor. In his Inquiry Concerning the Population of Nations (1818), he professed "astonishment" at Malthus's "general indemnity" of the rich and powerful:

Mr Malthus considers that attributing in any way the distress of the poor to the higher classes of society is a vulgar error [...] and that it depends on the conduct of the poor themselves. Does slavery depend on the slaves themselves? [...] Does it depend on the Irish peasantry that the proprietors are absentees? or, on the Catholics of Ireland that they pay tithes to the protestant clergy? Does it depend on the poor of England that they pay for salt a tax thirty times the original cost of the article?

Seizing upon Malthus's proposition that "manufacturing is at once the consequence of a better distribution of property and the cause of further improvement", Ensor was later to press the argument that poverty is sustained, not by a reckless propensity to breed, but by government's indulgence of the heedless concentration of private wealth.

A similar broadside was published in 1821 by Whitely Stokes. His Observations on the population and resources of Ireland found fault in Malthus's calculations and juxtapositions, and insisting upon the advantages mankind derives from "improved industry, improved conveyance, improvements in morals, government and religion", argued that Ireland's difficulty lay not in her "numbers", but in her indifferent government.

William Godwin criticized Malthus's criticisms of his own arguments in his book Of Population (1820). Other theoretical and political critiques of Malthus and Malthusian thinking emerged soon after the publication of the first Essay on Population, most notably in the work of Robert Owen, of the essayist William Hazlitt (1807) and of the economist Nassau William Senior, and moralist William Cobbett. True Law of Population (1845) was by politician Thomas Doubleday, an adherent of Cobbett's views.

John Stuart Mill strongly defended the ideas of Malthus in his 1848 work, Principles of Political Economy (Book II, Chapters 11–13). Mill considered the criticisms of Malthus made thus far to have been superficial.

The American economist Henry Charles Carey rejected Malthus's argument in his magnum opus of 1858–59, The Principles of Social Science. Carey maintained that the only situation in which the means of subsistence will determine population growth is one in which a given society is not introducing new technologies or not adopting forward-thinking governmental policy, and that population regulated itself in every well-governed society, but its pressure on subsistence characterized the lower stages of civilization.

Another American, Daniel Raymond stated in his Thoughts on Political Economy (1820) "Although his theory is founded upon the principles of nature, and although it is impossible to discover any flaw in his reasoning, yet the mind instinctively revolts at the conclusions to which he conducts it, and we are disposed to reject the theory, even though we could give no good reason." This rejection of conclusions, coincides with Malthus's own observation that "America had not reached the stage where the difficulties in increasing production were great enough appreciably to check population".

In France, ideas concerning overpopulation had been prevalent some time before Malthus published his Essay, "Pre-Malthusian French writers had developed an unorganized set of observations more in accord with fact and probability than Malthus' well-integrated doctrine". By 1798 two broad bodies of thought had already begun to form in the country, those who like Malthus, saw a danger in overpopulation and the stressing of productive limits, and the "pro-populationists" who argued that population growth would lead to productivity growth, and thus should be encouraged.

=== Marxist opposition ===
Another strand of opposition to Malthus's ideas started in the middle of the 19th century with the writings of Friedrich Engels (Outlines of a Critique of Political Economy, 1844) and Karl Marx (Capital, 1867). Engels and Marx argued that what Malthus saw as the problem of the pressure of population on the means of production actually represented the pressure of the means of production on population. They thus viewed it in terms of their concept of the reserve army of labour. In other words, the seeming excess of population that Malthus attributed to the seemingly innate disposition of the poor to reproduce beyond their means actually emerged as a product of the very dynamic of capitalist economy.

Engels called Malthus's hypothesis "the crudest, most barbarous theory that ever existed, a system of despair which struck down all those beautiful phrases about love thy neighbour and world citizenship". Engels also predicted that science would solve the problem of an adequate food supply.

In the Marxist tradition, Lenin sharply criticized Malthusian theory and its neo-Malthusian version, calling it a "reactionary doctrine" and "an attempt on the part of bourgeois ideologists to exonerate capitalism and to prove the inevitability of privation and misery for the working class under any social system".

In addition, many Russian philosophers could not easily apply Malthus' population theory to Russian society in the 1840s. In England, where Malthus lived, population was rapidly increasing but suitable agricultural land was limited. Russia, on the other hand, had extensive land with agricultural potential yet a relatively sparse population. It is possible that this discrepancy between Russian and English realities contributed to the rejection of Malthus' Essay on the Principle of Population by key Russian thinkers. Another difference which contributed to the confusion and ultimately the rejection of Malthus's argument in Russia was its cultural basis in English capitalism. This political contrast helps explain why it took Russia twenty years to publish a review of the work and fifty years to translate Malthus's Essay.

=== Later responses ===
In the 20th century, those who regarded Malthus as a failed prophet of doom included an editor of Nature, John Maddox.

Economist Julian Lincoln Simon has criticised Malthus's conclusions. He notes that despite the predictions of Malthus and of the neo-Malthusians, massive geometric population growth in the 20th century did not result in a Malthusian catastrophe. Many factors have been identified as having contributed: general improvements in farming methods (industrial agriculture), mechanization of work (tractors), the introduction of high-yield varieties of wheat and other plants (Green Revolution), the use of pesticides to control crop pests. Each played a role.

The enviro-sceptic Bjørn Lomborg presented data to argue the case that the environment had actually improved, and that calories produced per day per capita globally went up 23% between 1960 and 2000, despite the doubling of the world population in that period.

From the opposite angle, Romanian American economist Nicholas Georgescu-Roegen, a progenitor in economics and a paradigm founder of ecological economics, has argued that Malthus was too optimistic, as he failed to recognize any upper limit to the growth of population—only, the geometric increase in human numbers is occasionally slowed down (checked) by the arithmetic increase in agricultural produce, according to Malthus' simple growth model; but some upper limit to population is bound to exist, as the total amount of agricultural land—actual as well as potential—on Earth is finite, Georgescu-Roegen points out. Georgescu-Roegen further argues that the industrialised world's increase in agricultural productivity since Malthus' day has been brought about by a mechanisation that has substituted a scarcer source of input for the more abundant input of solar radiation: Machinery, chemical fertilisers and pesticides all rely on mineral resources for their operation, rendering modern agriculture—and the industrialised food processing and distribution systems associated with it—almost as dependent on Earth's mineral stock as the industrial sector has always been. Georgescu-Roegen cautions that this situation is a major reason why the carrying capacity of Earth—that is, Earth's capacity to sustain human populations and consumption levels—is bound to decrease sometime in the future as Earth's finite stock of mineral resources is presently being extracted and put to use. Political advisor Jeremy Rifkin and ecological economist Herman Daly, two students of Georgescu-Roegen, have raised similar neo-Malthusian concerns about the long run drawbacks of modern mechanised agriculture.

Anthropologist Eric Ross depicts Malthus's work as a rationalization of the social inequities produced by the Industrial Revolution, anti-immigration movements, the eugenics movement and the various international development movements.

=== Social theory ===
Despite use of the term "Malthusian catastrophe" by detractors such as economist Julian Simon (1932–1998), Malthus himself did not write that mankind faced an inevitable future catastrophe. Rather, he offered an evolutionary social theory of population dynamics as it had acted steadily throughout all previous history. Eight major points regarding population dynamics appear in the 1798 Essay:

1. subsistence severely limits population-level
2. when the means of subsistence increases, population increases
3. population-pressures stimulate increases in productivity
4. increases in productivity stimulate further population-growth
5. because productivity increases cannot maintain the potential rate of population growth, population requires strong checks to keep parity with the carrying-capacity
6. individual cost/benefit decisions regarding sex, work, and children determine the expansion or contraction of population and production
7. checks will come into operation as population exceeds subsistence-level
8. the nature of these checks will have significant effect on the larger sociocultural system—Malthus points specifically to misery, vice, and poverty

Malthusian social theory influenced Herbert Spencer's idea of the survival of the fittest, and the modern ecological-evolutionary social theory of Gerhard Lenski and Marvin Harris. Malthusian ideas have thus contributed to the canon of socioeconomic theory.

The first Director-General of UNESCO, Julian Huxley, wrote of The crowded world in his Evolutionary Humanism (1964), calling for a world population policy. Huxley openly criticised communist and Roman Catholic attitudes to birth control, population control and overpopulation.

=== Biology ===
Charles Darwin and Alfred Russel Wallace each read and acknowledged the role played by Malthus in the development of their own ideas. Darwin referred to Malthus as "that great philosopher", and said of his On the Origin of Species: "This is the doctrine of Malthus, applied with manifold force to the animal and vegetable kingdoms, for in this case there can be no artificial increase of food, and no prudential restraint from marriage".

Darwin also wrote:

"In October 1838 ... I happened to read for amusement Malthus on Population ... it at once struck me that under these circumstances favourable variations would tend to be preserved, and unfavourable ones to be destroyed. The result of this would be the formation of new species."

— Barlow, Nora 1958. The autobiography of Charles Darwin. p. 128

Wallace stated:

But perhaps the most important book I read was Malthus's Principles of Population ... It was the first great work I had yet read treating of any of the problems of philosophical biology, and its main principles remained with me as a permanent possession, and twenty years later gave me the long-sought clue to the effective agent in the evolution of organic species.

— Wallace, Alfred Russel 1908. My life: a record of events and opinions.

Ronald Fisher commented sceptically on Malthusianism as a basis for a theory of natural selection. Fisher emphasised the role of fecundity (reproductive rate), rather than assume actual conditions would not reduce future births.

John Maynard Smith doubted that famine functioned as the great leveller, as portrayed by Malthus, but he also accepted the basic premises:

Populations cannot increase geometrically forever. Sooner or later, a shortage of resources must bring the increase to a halt.

=== Later parallels ===
Writers who have presented ideas that have paralleled various of those of Malthus include: Paul R. Ehrlich who has written several books predicting famine as a result of population increase: The Population Bomb (1968); Population, resources, environment: issues in human ecology (1970, with Anne Ehrlich); The end of affluence (1974, with Anne Ehrlich); The population explosion (1990, with Anne Ehrlich). In the late 1960s Ehrlich predicted that hundreds of millions would die from a coming overpopulation-crisis in the 1970s. Other examples of work that has been accused of "Malthusianism" include the 1972 book The Limits to Growth (published by the Club of Rome) and the Global 2000 report to the then President of the United States Jimmy Carter. Isaac Asimov also produced many essays on topics related to overpopulation.

Ecological economist Herman Daly has recognized the influence of Malthus on his own work on steady-state economics.

Other scholars have more recently linked population and economics to a third variable, political change and political violence, and to show how the variables interact. In the early 1980s, Jack Goldstone linked population variables to the English Revolution of 1640–1660 and David Lempert devised a model of demographics, economics, and political change in the multi-ethnic country of Mauritius. Goldstone has since modeled other revolutions by looking at demographics and economics and Lempert has explained Stalin's purges and the Russian Revolution of 1917 in terms of demographic factors that drive political economy. Ted Robert Gurr has also modeled political violence, such as in the Palestinian territories and in Rwanda/Congo (two of the world's regions of most rapidly growing population) using similar variables in several comparative cases. These approaches suggest that political ideology follows demographic forces.

Physics professor, Albert Allen Bartlett, has lectured over 1,500 times on "Arithmetic, Population, and Energy", promoting sustainable living and explaining the mathematics of overpopulation.

Malthus is directly referenced by science-fiction author K. Eric Drexler in Engines of Creation (1986): "In a sense, opening space will burst our limits to growth, since we know of no end to the universe. Nevertheless, Malthus was essentially right."

The Malthusian growth model now bears Malthus's name. The logistic function of Pierre François Verhulst (1804–1849) results in the S-curve. Verhulst developed the logistic growth model favored by so many critics of the Malthusian growth model in 1838 only after reading Malthus's essay.

== See also ==
- Book of Murder – two satirical attacks on the Poor Law Amendment Act 1834
- The dismal science
- Benjamin Franklin
- Daniel Quinn
- William Godwin
- David Hume
- Marquis de Condorcet
- Montesquieu
- Richard Price
- Adam Smith
