= Al-Jāhiz (crater) =

Crater on Mercury

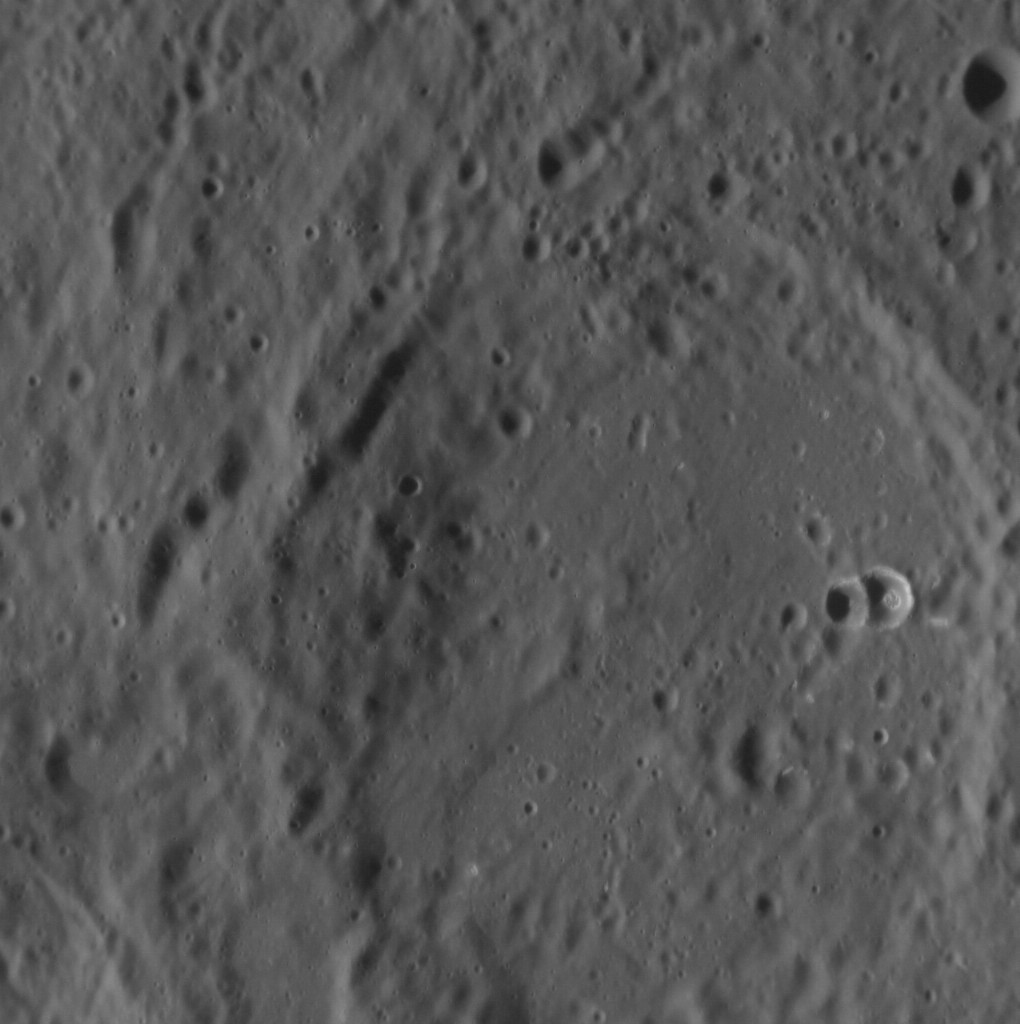
- MESSENGER NAC image of Al-Jāhiz
- Feature type: Impact crater
- Location: Kuiper quadrangle, Mercury
- Coordinates: 1.2°N 21.5°W
- Diameter: 83 km
- Eponym: Al-Jahiz

Al-Jāhiz is a crater on Mercury. It has a diameter of 83 kilometers. Its name was proposed by astrophysicist David Morrison and adopted by the International Astronomical Union (IAU) in 1976. Al-Jāhiz is named for the Arab writer Al-Jahiz, who died in Basra, Iraq, in 869 C.E.

Lu Hsun crater is southwest of Al-Jāhiz.
