= Simmons–Tierney bet =

Wager over oil prices between Matthew R. Simmons and John Tierney

The Simmons–Tierney bet was a wager made in August 2005 between Houston banking executive Matthew Simmons and New York Times columnist John Tierney. The stakes of the bet were US$10,000.00. The subject of the bet was the year-end average of the daily price-per-barrel of crude oil for the entire calendar year of 2010 adjusted for inflation, which Simmons predicted to be at least $200. The bet was to be settled on January 1, 2011.

At the time the bet was made in 2005, the price of oil was $65. It soared to an all-time high of $145 per barrel in 2008 before plummeting below $50 per barrel during the 2008 financial crisis. The average price for a barrel of oil in 2010 was $80 ($71 in 2005 dollars), less than the $200 Simmons predicted. Simmons died on August 8, 2010, and the bet was paid out by his colleagues in Tierney's favor.

== Background ==
Simmons and Tierney had never met prior to the bet. Their association began after Simmons had been interviewed by a journalist colleague of Tierney's, Peter Maass, for a New York Times Magazine article called "The Breaking Point," published on August 21, 2005. The article heavily emphasized the doomsday claims of Simmons's latest book Twilight in the Desert: The Coming Saudi Oil Shock and the World Economy, which contains Simmons's prophecy of imminent global catastrophe which he asserted will be triggered by the allegedly soon-coming "peaking" of Saudi oil output, and the supposed domino effect of destruction that will subsequently be wreaked upon the global economy. Tierney's dubious reaction to the article prompted him to call Simmons, introduce himself, and ask Simmons to back up his claims with cash. The friendly wager was immediately worked out over the phone.

== Terms of the bet ==
Of the many claims that Simmons made in the Times article, his prediction of a tripling in the price-per-barrel of crude oil struck Tierney as perhaps the most incredible. In the Peter Maass article, Simmons was quoted as saying:

"We're going to look back at history and say $55 a barrel was cheap," [Simmons] said, recalling a TV interview in which he predicted that a barrel might hit triple digits. [Simmons] said that the anchor scoffed, in disbelief, "A hundred dollars?" Simmons replied, "I wasn't talking about low triple digits."

Tierney focused upon that one detail and the two men fashioned the bet accordingly. Their final agreement was a commitment to tabulate every closing price-per-barrel of oil for each market day of 2010, then average out those prices for the entire year from January 1 through December 31, adjusted for inflation to 2005 prices. If the year-end adjusted average comes out to $200.00 or more per barrel, Mr. Simmons wins. If it averages out to less than $200.00, Mr. Tierney wins. The winner takes the entire pot of US$10,000.00, plus interest—$5,000.00 from both parties, placed in escrow.

The bet was made public just two days later in an op-ed piece by Tierney published in The New York Times on August 23, 2005, called "The $10,000.00 Question".

== Precedent and legacy of the Simon–Ehrlich wager ==
This bet was admitted by both parties to be a good-natured resurrection of the same spirit and tradition behind the famous Simon–Ehrlich wager which spanned the years 1980–1990.

Tierney was a lifelong friend and protégé of the late Julian Simon (the winner of the Simon–Ehrlich wager), and eagerly embraced the opportunity to follow in his mentor's footsteps. Tierney is (as was Simon) an avowed Cornucopian, believing in the ingenuity of humankind to adapt and improvise. Meanwhile, Simmons' Twilight in the Desert seemed to Tierney to be cut from the same doom-and-gloom cloth as Paul R. Ehrlich's The Population Bomb, a book published in 1968 which later became the impetus for the Simon–Ehrlich wager. When that well-renowned wager was settled in 1990, Simon's boomster victory over Ehrlich's doomster philosophies was heralded as a triumph for Cornucopian economics.

Tierney made unabashed reference to that legendary wager as he gave his apologetic for embarking upon this redux of it:

I didn't try to argue with [Simmons] about Saudi Arabia, because I know next to nothing about oil production there or anywhere else. I'm just following the advice of a mentor and friend, the economist Julian Simon: if you find anyone willing to bet that natural resource prices are going up, take him for all you can.

== Inclusion of Rita Simon ==
After the bet was agreed upon (but before it was made public) Tierney immediately called Rita Simon, the widow of Julian Simon. She delightedly joined with Tierney's effort to carry on with her late husband's legacy, and even financed one half of Tierney's obligation to the bet by contributing US$2,500.00 of her own.

== Simmons's death ==
Matthew Simmons died on August 8, 2010, thus preventing him from personally seeing the bet through to its resolution on January 1, 2011.

== Ongoing updates ==
The price-per-barrel of crude oil was heavily scrutinized by oil industry watchers aware of this bet. Many peak oil websites made frequent reference to the Simmons–Tierney bet and some made daily tabulations and adjusted-for-inflation charts on the latest price-per-barrel. (The price-per-barrel of oil at the time of the bet—August 2005—was around $65.00. The price as of the initial publishing of this article—May 10, 2008—was $125.96; the record high of $147 in July 2008 was attributed by some to a weak U.S. dollar.)

With the dramatic drop in demand and prices for many commodities in the 2008 financial crisis, the average per-barrel price for December 2008 reached a post-spike low of $40.88. At the time, Simmons was asked by a reporter if he had any second thoughts about the wager and replied, "God, no. We bet on the average price in 2010. That’s an eternity from now." The price of oil steadily climbed back to an average of $78.33 for the month of January 2010. As of December 2018, the inflation adjusted price of oil has still not surpassed the July 2008 peak. Both Simmons and Tierney publicly availed their e-mail addresses with a formal and open invitation to anyone else in the general population who might like to make similar wagers.
