= After the Spike =

2025 nonfiction book by Dean Spears and Michael Geruso

- Author: Dean Spears and Michael Geruso
- Language: English
- Publisher: Simon and Schuster
- Publication date: July 8, 2025
- Media type: Hardcover, Paperback, ebook
- Pages: 320
- ISBN: 9781668057339
- OCLC: 1528475081
- Website: https://afterthespike.com/

After the Spike: Population, Progress, and the Case for People is a nonfiction book by economist Dean Spears and Michael Geruso published by Simon and Schuster in 2025, that examines global demographic trends, particularly the decline in fertility rates and its potential consequences for society, material progress, and environmental sustainability.

== Background ==
Global human population growth over the past two centuries has been driven by declining mortality rates, particularly in infants, even as fertility rates have steadily declined. Spears and Geruso use the term "the spike" to describe this historical period of rapid population growth that has taken humanity to a peak before projected to decline in the latter half of the 21st century.

== Themes ==
After the Spike challenges prevalent assumptions about population dynamics and their implications for society. Its core arguments include:

- Depopulation concerns: Rather than viewing population decline as beneficial for the environment or economic reasons the authors arguer that shrinking populations threaten material progress, innovation and social equity.
- Human progress and scale: The book suggests that ingenuity and progress have been tied to large, interconnected populations, and that a smaller global population could reduce the capacity for innovation and collective problem-solving.
- Policy proposals: To counter demographic decline, Spears and Geruso advocate for policies that make parenting more supported socially and economically, emphasizing reproductive freedom, childcare, parental leave, and cultural changes that value caregiving roles.

== Reception ==
The book has received varied attention from reviewers and commentators.

- The Guardian described it as a "persuasive debunking of demographic myths" and noted its provocative reevaluation of population trends.
- A review in the Independent Institute emphasizes the detailed demographic projections and economics reasoning behind the book's argument that declining fertility rates may lead to gradual depopulation with wide-ranging effects on society and the economy.
- Aidan Grogan writing for Law & Liberty described the book as a "straightforward and cogent" repudiation of the myth that the world is overpopulated and highlights that humans are a "net good—for innovation, for rising living standards, and yes, even for the planet."
- The New Indian Express characterized the book as bold and data-rich, emphasizing its challenge to the notion that the population decline inherently solves global problems and its framing of people as drivers of progress rather than burdens to be reduced.
- Tom Calver’s review in The Times highlights the book’s exploration of declining global fertility rates below replacement level, its account of how population growth has historically fueled technological advancement and innovation, and its discussion of the increasing opportunity costs of having children in a world rich with alternative life paths. However, he also faults the authors for giving too little weight to humanity’s ability to confront and overcome these challenges.

== See also ==
- Demographic economics
- Fertility rate
- Julian Simon
- Natalism
- Population decline
- Population growth
- Population aging
- Simon–Ehrlich wager
