= The Torist =

- Website type: Literary review
- Available in: English
- Website: toristinkirir4xj.onion
- Launched: 2015

The Torist was a literary journal first released in late 2015, published on the Tor anonymity network. It features short stories, essays and poetry. One of the reasons for publishing on Tor was to return to the idea of rummaging through antiquarian shops – "It gets back to the time when you had to find The Evergreen Review in the stacks at the vintage bookstore" – and the zine can only be accessed through Tor, a dark web site. Its founders are the pseudonymous G.M.H., named after the reclusive 19th-century poet Gerard Manley Hopkins, and Prof. Robert W. Gehl, who is a communication professor focusing on new media at the University of Utah. The two met on the dark-net social network Galaxy, and started collaborating in 2014, taking two years to produce the first issue of the journal. Submissions are made through the anonymous and open-source GlobaLeaks platform — intended for whistleblowing. The founders hope this anonymity can bolster creativity among submissions, and wish to show that anonymity online isn't only for illicit activities.

Entries in the first issue were all named, including acclaimed poet Alissa Quart as well as other authors such as: Vance Osterhout, Linda Kronman, Andreas Zingerle, Nathanel Bassett, Peter Conlin, and JM Porup.

The Torist is designed ... to throw a spanner in the works of various attempts to smear anonymity as being only desirable for evil people

— G.H.M. (founder),

The entries have also gravitated towards issues concerning the modern internet, such as: prolific advertising, surveillance, censorship, and Edward Snowden. As of 2016 entries are being accepted for the second edition of the magazine/journal, on a non-paid basis, but now allowing also anonymous entries. All content in The Torist is published under a Creative Commons license.

As of July 2021, The Torist is offline, due to the shutdown of Tor's Version 2 Onion Services and the fact that The Torist has never moved to Onion Services Version 3. It is likely that The Torist was taken offline before that date.
