= Economic Hardship Reporting Project =

American journalists organization

- Website type: Journalism
- Headquarters: New York City, US
- Creator: Barbara Ehrenreich
- Editors: Alissa Quart; David Wallis; Deborah Jian Lee
- Website: economichardship.org
- Commercial: No

The Economic Hardship Reporting Project (EHRP) is an U.S. nonprofit organization that supports independent journalists covering social inequality and issues surrounding economic justice. Founded by Barbara Ehrenreich, it funds and co-publishes independent journalism at publications including the New York Times, the Guardian, the New Yorker, Teen Vogue, and Vice with the aim to mobilize readers of these mainstream outlets to query and disrupt systems that perpetuate economic hardship.

EHRP's work has been profiled by outlets such as Vogue, Forbes, Democracy Now!, the Nonprofit Quarterly, Wisconsin Public Radio, and the International Journalists Network. Its executive director is Alissa Quart.

== History ==
Inspired by the Farm Security Administration and the Works Progress Administration New Deal initiatives of the Great Depression, EHRP was founded in 2012 by writer, journalist, and activist Barbara Ehrenreich in response to the 2008 recession and with the aim to help working-class journalists stay in the field. In a 2015 article published in the Guardian, she wrote, "In America, only the rich can afford to write about poverty," summing up the media climate EHRP aims to transform. In 2022, EHRP's executive director Alissa Quart told Columbia Magazine:

"Around 30,000 newspaper reporters lost their jobs between 2008 and 2015. Media tends to be made by rich people, for middle-class people, about poor people. We exist in part to change that equation so more of the people writing about the working poor or struggling middle class are themselves working poor or struggling middle class."

== Projects ==
The EHRP funds and co-publishes independent journalism at a range of publications, including The New York Times, The Guardian, The Nation, The New Yorker, Teen Vogue, and Vice. Reporting under the organization takes the form of investigative articles, such as one on how oil and gas wells are harming plant workers and neighboring communities, and personal essays that depict poverty's impact on societal and individual levels, including Bobbi Dempsey's essay about Medicaid’s lack of hearing aid coverage.

The organization also supports television segments, including economic reporting by KITV’s news desk in Hawaii, and documentaries produced by outlets like PBS's Frontline, Scientific American, and The Intercept. EHRP-supported journalism also takes the form of podcasts, including ones produced with The Nation, To the Best of Our Knowledge, and Fast Company, as well as illustrations published in The Guardian and The Nation, and poems focused on workers' rights and reproductive justice. A number of projects focus on U.S. Midwestern and Southern rural communities.

=== Documentaries ===
The EHRP has produced the following documentaries:

– The Last Holdouts
– The Last Clinic
– Jackson
– American Reckoning

With the Intercept, it has also produced three separate film docuseries: Precarity, Freedom Dreams, and Insecurity.

== Organization and funding ==
As of January 2023, EHRP has a seven-person staff, including executive director Alissa Quart, who joined it in 2013, managing director David Wallis, and special correspondent Ray Suarez. Former Columbia Journalism School instructor Deborah Jian Lee is an editor. She told Columbia University's alumni magazine, "It’s often hard for people to understand how broader systems impact inequality, so my goal is to tell human stories." Journalist and author Helaine Olen sits on its advisory board.

In addition to a roster of freelance contributors, EHRP supports 11 reporting fellows as of January 2023, including Joseph Rodriguez and Molly Crabapple. A 2022 Forbes article shared that "roughly 38% of [EHRP’s] contributors are people of color, and about 67% are women."

In 2022, Quart shared the aim to help economically vulnerable journalists in an article about the EHRP in International Journalists Network's magazine:

"Working with writers from these backgrounds also involves rethinking how writers are paid. We pay people upfront, usually, 50% especially if they are lower-income and communicate that to us. Paying 50% or paying on time made a huge difference. Part of what we are about as an organization is keeping journalists in the business. If that means that piece comes out later or doesn't come out at all, it is still more important for the majority to get this 50%, and that they can still try to work as reporters."

In late 2017, when Gothamist and DNAinfo were both shuttered by their owner, EHRP allocated $5,000 to three reporters from these outlets who had lost their jobs.

The organization is funded both by individual donations and organizational grants which include, or have included, Acton Family Giving, Ford Foundation, the James Irvine Foundation, the Melville Charitable Trust, the Omidyar Network, Open Society Foundations, and the Puffin Foundation.

== Impact ==
EHRP's work has impacted national policies. In 2017, an investigation into the high rates of farmer suicides in the U.S. co-published by EHRP and the Guardian directly influenced Washington State legislator J.T. Wilcox and Rep. Tom Emmer of Minnesota to sponsor and introduce laws and funding for more accessible mental healthcare programs for farmers. Wilcox is quoted as saying, "Without the reporting of The Guardian's Debbie Weingarten, I and so many others would have remained in the dark about this public health crisis."

In 2022, the U.S. Treasury Department was prompted to issue guidance on the use of federal housing stability funds after EHRP-supported reporting in the Salt Lake Tribune revealed those funds were being used to pay legal bills for evictions. EHRP's investigation with USA Today, called "Dying For Care," was cited by the Biden administration in its argument for reform of the U.S. nursing home industry.

In 2021, EHRP worked on more than 400 editorial placements "with a potential reach of more than 1.6 billion" according to Meltwater, a media monitoring company.

== Critical and other reception ==
EHRP's work was profiled by Vogue in 2018, and Forbes, Democracy Now!, and the International Journalists Network in 2022. Suarez was also interviewed in the Nonprofit Quarterly for "Going for Broke" in 2022 and the series discussed on Wisconsin Public Radio's Morning Show.

In 2019, EHRP's Jackson documentary won an Emmy for Best Documentary, Social Issue

The first season of EHRP's podcast, "Going for Broke with Ray Suarez," co-produced with the Nation, was named one of 2021's best podcasts by the Atlantic. That same year EHRP was named Best Non-Traditional News Source in NYU's 2021 American Journalism Online Awards

In October 2021, Rep. Alexandria Ocasio-Cortez mentioned EHRP's "Boss Workers" project, a collaboration with Mother Jones and Solutions Journalism Network that documented the rise of worker co-ops during the pandemic, as an example of a story "of democracy working in hopeful ways and coolest evidence-based reporting."

== Other awards and honors ==
- Bernhardt Labor Journalism Prize for Molly Crabapple's article "How the Taxi Workers Won"
- 2022 Webby Award Honoree – Going for Broke podcast
- EHRP Wins Sigma Delta Chi Award From the Society of Professional Journalists for Going for Broke podcast
- The Last Holdouts documentary, co-published by EHRP and Scientific American, wins second place in News and Issues team category at the National Press Photographers Association's 2022 Best of Photojournalism awards from
- The Last Clinic documentary nominated for a National Magazine Award and a Documentary Emmy.
