= Cornucopianism =

Ideological position in futurism

Cornucopianism is the idea that the continued supply of the material needs of humankind can be achieved through continued advances in technology. It contends that there is enough matter and energy available for practically unlimited growth.

The term comes from the cornucopia, the "horn of plenty" of Greek mythology, which magically supplied its owners with endless food and drink. Adherents are called "cornucopians" or sometimes "boomsters," in contrast to doomsters, whose views are more aligned with Malthusianism."

== Theory ==
"When civilization [population] increases, the available labor again increases. In turn, luxury again increases in correspondence with rising profits, and the customs and needs of luxury likewise increase. Crafts are created to obtain luxury products. The value realized from them increases, and, as a result, profits are again multiplied in them. Production there is thriving even more than before. And so it goes with the second and third increase. All the additional labor serves luxury and wealth, in contrast to the original labor that served the necessity of life." — Ibn Khaldun (1332–1406), from Muqaddimah

In Progress and Poverty written in 1879, after describing the powerful reproductive forces of nature, the political economist Henry George wrote, "That the earth could maintain a thousand billions of people as easily as a thousand millions is a necessary deduction from the manifest truths that, at least so far as our agency is concerned, matter is eternal and force must forever continue to act."

Julian Simon was one of the best-known cornucopian thinkers in modern times, who suggested in his book, The Ultimate Resource, published in 1981, that humans have always found a way to develop and enhance resources over virtually any roadblock. He suggested that while resources may come and go, the knowledge that can come from a bigger population, and thus more workforce/intellect, humanity would continuously be able to find newer sources of energy. Simon did argue, however, that for humans to pursue innovation and new energy sources, free markets must be present to assign value to energy sources through their prices for production and use. Once the price of a certain resource becomes too high due to a lack of supply, it would encourage new research into alternative sources to seek cheaper energy.

== Description by an opposing view ==
Stereotypically, a cornucopian is someone who posits that there are few intractable natural limits to growth and believes the world can provide a practically limitless abundance of natural resources. The label "cornucopian" is rarely self-applied, and is most commonly used derogatorily by those who view this perspective as overly optimistic about the resources that will be available in the future.

One common example of this labeling is by those who are skeptical of the view that technology can solve, or overcome, the problem of an exponentially-increasing human population living off a finite base of natural resources. Cornucopians might counter that human population growth has slowed dramatically, and not only is currently growing at a linear rate, but is projected to peak and start declining in the second half of the 21st century. As of 2024, the global population is expected to peak in the mid-2080s, around 10.3 billion people, and fall to 10.2 by the end of the 21st century.

== Criticism ==
Lindsey Grant accuses cornucopians, especially Julian Simon and Herman Kahn, of making arguments with logical flaws, omissions, and oversights, and of making assumptions and choosing methodologies that ignore or dismiss the most critical issues. Historian of science Naomi Oreskes criticized cornucopianism, arguing that while there were technological innovations to increase agricultural productivity for a growing world, "the cornucopian perspective ignores other important facts", such as that "an enormous number of these inventions" such as gains in health and life expectancy, "came into being through government actions", and arguing that "technological progress has not stopped the unfolding climate crisis."

== See also ==
- Ibn Khaldun
- Albert Allen Bartlett
- Candide
- William R. Catton Jr.
- Dematerialization (economics)
- Ester Boserup
- Food security
- Jacque Fresco
- John McCarthy
- Julian Simon and Simon–Ehrlich wager
- Matt Simmons
- Ron Arnold
- Post-scarcity economy
- RethinkX
