= Mirror Awards =

Annual journalism awards focused on media industry reporting

- Awarded for: Excellence in media industry reporting
- Country: United States
- Presented by: S.I. Newhouse School of Public Communications at Syracuse University
- First award: 2006
- Website: newhouse.syr.edu/centers/mirror-awards/

The Mirror Awards are annual journalism awards recognizing the work of writers, reporters, editors and organizations who cover the media industry. The awards were established by the S.I. Newhouse School of Public Communications in 2006.

Awards categories have varied slightly from year to year. Since 2018, categories included:
• Best Single Article/Story
• Best Profile
• Best Commentary
• John M. Higgins Award for Best In-Depth/Enterprise Reporting

Special topic categories reflecting the major news stories of the previous year have also been added each year since 2018.

== John M. Higgins Award ==
The John M. Higgins Award for Best In-Depth/Enterprise Reporting was established by the Newhouse School in December 2011 to honor the late Broadcasting & Cable business editor, who died in 2006. The award is supported by a financial gift from Discovery Communications and Time Warner Cable and carries a $5,000 cash prize. Each of the remaining awards carries a $1,000 cash prize.

== Nominations & Judging ==
Nominations for the Mirror Awards are made online each year beginning in December. The competition is open to anyone who conducts reporting, commentary or criticism of the media industries. Eligible work includes print, broadcast and online editorial content focusing on the development or distribution of news and entertainment. Entries are evaluated based on excellence of craft, framing of the issue and appropriateness for the intended audience. Winners are chosen by a group of journalists and journalism educators.

== Awards Ceremony ==
Winners are honored at an awards ceremony in New York City each June. Ceremony emcees have included Meredith Vieira (2007); Andy Borowitz (2008); Newhouse alumna Contessa Brewer '96 (2009); Katie Couric (2010); Joe Scarborough and Mika Brzezinski (2011); Anderson Cooper (2012); David Muir (2013); Gayle King (2014); Savannah Guthrie (2015); Newhouse alumnus Jeff Glor '97 (2016); Jenna Bush Hager (2017); Kimberly Brooks (2018); Alisyn Camerota (2019); Michelle Marsh (2021), and Contessa Brewer (2022).

== Award winners ==
2007
Clive Thompson, New York magazine
Philip Weiss, New York Magazine David Carr, The New York Times
Dean Miller, Nieman Reports
Andreas Kluth, The Economist
HealthNewsReview.org, University of Minnesota School of Journalism and Mass Communication
American Journalism Review

2008
Frontline, PBS
The New York Times: Monday Media section
Ken Auletta, The New Yorker
Jeff Coplon, New York Magazine
Joe Nocera, The New York Times

2009
David Carr, The New York Times
David Barstow, The New York Times
David Kamp, Vanity Fair
Seth Mnookin, Vanity Fair
Ian Parker, The New Yorker
Clive Thompson, Wired.com

2010
Steven Johnson, TIME
Megan Garber, Columbia Journalism Review
Evan Osnos, The New Yorker
Matt Pressman, Vanity Fair
Nancy Jo Sales, Vanity Fair
Dean Starkman, Columbia Journalism Review
Michael Wolff, Vanity Fair

2011
Eric Alterman, Center for American Progress
Ken Auletta, The New Yorker
Jim Hopkins, Gannett Blog
Joel Meares, Columbia Journalism Review
Gabriel Sherman, New York Magazine
Mary Van de Kamp Nohl, Milwaukee Magazine
James Wolcott, Vanity Fair

2012
Adam Lashinsky, Fortune
Ken Auletta, The New Yorker
Anna Holmes, The New York Times & The Washington Post
Peter Maass, The New Yorker & ProPublica
Joe Pompeo, Capital New York
Rhonda Roland Shearer and Malik Ayub Sumbal, iMediaEthics
Rebecca Traister, Salon (website) and The New York Times Magazine

2013
Adrian Chen, Gawker
Missouri Press Association
Craig Silverman, Poynter Institute
Syed Irfan Ashraf, Dawn, Pique
Joe Eskenazi, San Francisco Weekly
Ken Auletta, The New Yorker
Jodi Enda, American Journalism Review

2014
Rachel Aviv, The New Yorker
Erik Wemple, The Washington Post
Brooke Gladstone, Katya Rogers, Alex Goldman, PJ Vogt, Sarah Abdurrahman, Chris Neary, On the Media
Michael Specter, The New Yorker
Michael Meyer, Columbia Journalism Review
Jina Moore Salon (website), Columbia Journalism Review, The Atlantic
Frank Greve, CQ Researcher

2015
Yang Xiao, Nieman Reports
Benjamin Wallace, New York magazine
Anna Griffin, Nieman Reports
Amanda Hess, Pacific Standard
Bob Garfield, Katya Rogers, On the Media
Bryan Burrough, Sarah Ellison, Suzanna Andrews, Vanity Fair

2016
Peter Elkind, Fortune (magazine)
Celeste LeCompte, Nieman Reports
Matthew Billy, Between the Liner Notes
Taffy Brodesser-Akner, GQ
Frank Rich, New York (magazine)
Jonathan Mahler, The New York Times Magazine

2017
Sarah Esther Maslin, Columbia Journalism Review
Soraya Chemaly and Catherine Buni, The Verge
Eric Alterman, The Nation
Gabriel Sherman, New York (magazine)

2018
Lois Parshley, Pacific Standard
Jim Rutenberg, The New York Times Magazine
Jack Shafer and Tucker Doherty, Politico
Amanda Robb, Center for Investigative Reporting, PRX, and Rolling Stone
Irin Carmon and Amy Brittain, The Washington Post
Ronan Farrow, The New Yorker
Jodi Kantor, Megan Twohey, Rachel Abrams, Ellen Gabler, Susan Dominus, Jim Rutenberg and Steve Eder, The New York Times

2019
Jesse Brenneman and Lois Beckett, WNYC Radio and Guardian US
Tim Alberta, Politico
Sarah Jones, Columbia Journalism Review
Davey Alba, BuzzFeed News
Miles O’Brien and Cameron Hickey, for PBS NewsHour
Ryan Mac, Charlie Warzel, Alex Kantrowitz, Pranav Dixit, Megha Rajagopalan, and Aisha Nazim for Facebook, BuzzFeed News
Ronan Farrow, The New Yorker

2020
Jane Mayer, The New Yorker
Molly Langmuir, Elle
Jenni Monet, Columbia Journalism Review and the Economic Hardship Reporting Project
Molly Webster and Bethel Habte, Radiolab/WNYC
Margaret Sullivan, The Washington Post
Brent Cunningham, Pacific Standard

2021
Lauren Markham, Columbia Journalism Review
Issac J. Bailey, Nieman Reports
Charles Bethea, The New Yorker
Micah Loewinger, Hampton Stall, Brooke Gladstone and Katya Rogers, On the Media /WNYC Studios
Lynsey Chutel, Lauren Harris, Linda Kinstler, Tony Lin, Zainab Sultan and Stephania Taladrid, Columbia Journalism Review
Casey Quackenbush, Nieman Reports

2022
Janell Ross, TIME
Jaeah Lee, Columbia Journalism Review
Alexandria Neason, Columbia Journalism Review
Robert Mackey, The Intercept
Jen Wieczner, Fortune
Sheera Frenkel and Tiffany Hsu, The New York Times

== Special awards ==
The awards ceremony also includes the presentation of two special awards: the Fred Dressler Leadership Award, named for the late cable executive and former chair of the Newhouse Advisory Board, which is given to individuals or organizations that have made distinct, consistent and unique contributions to the public’s understanding of the media; and the i-3 award for impact, innovation and influence, which is given to individuals or organizations that have made a profound impact on the media landscape or have captured the public’s imagination about the potential or importance of the media in a unique way. Recipients of the Dressler Award have included Dean Baquet, executive editor of The New York Times; Jorge Ramos of Noticias Univision (2021); Jeff Zucker, president of CNN Worldwide and chairman of WarnerMedia News and Sports (2019); Sheila Nevins of HBO Documentary Films (2018); journalist Tom Brokaw (2017); David Levy ’84, president of Turner Broadcasting System (2016); Josh Sapan, president and CEO of AMC Networks (2015); David Zaslav, president and CEO of Discovery Communications (2014); Anne Sweeney, co-chair of Disney Media Networks and president of Disney-ABC Television Group (2013); Brian L. Roberts, chairman and CEO of Comcast (2011); Bloomberg L.P. (2010); Arianna Huffington, co-founder and editor-in-chief of The Huffington Post (2009); political journalist Tim Russert (posthumously, 2008); and Peter Bart, editor-in-chief of Variety (2007). Recipients of the i-3 award have included Twitch (service) (2019); NPR (2018); The New York Times Company (2017); Nonny de la Peña (2016); David Carr (journalist) (posthumously, 2015); Kara Swisher and Walt Mossberg (2014); Nate Silver (2013); John S. and James L. Knight Foundation (2012); Newhouse alumnus Dennis Crowley ’98 and Naveen Selvadurai, co-founders of Foursquare (2011); Twitter (2010); Obama for America New Media Department/Blue State Digital (2009); and CNN/YouTube (2008).

In 2021, the Newhouse School announced the establishment of the Lorraine Branham IDEA Award, named for the school's late dean, to recognize a media organization that has worked to promote inclusion, diversity, equity and accessibility over the course of the previous year. Brown Girls Doc Mafia was the inaugural recipient. In 2022, The 19th News won the award.
