= John M. Higgins =

American reporter and editor

John McLaughlin Higgins (April 17, 1961 – November 21, 2006) was an American reporter and editor specializing in the cable television industry. His writings were often cited by academics, government officials, and other journalists, and a journalism award was named in his honor.

== Early life and education ==
Born in Rochester, New York, Higgins graduated in 1979 from Columbus High School in Miami, Florida. At the University of Notre Dame he became deeply involved with the student newspaper, The Observer. Higgins graduated from Marquette University in 1984 with a degree in marketing.

== Career ==
As a reporter for the Milwaukee Sentinel, starting in 1983, Higgins most often worked the police desk. He turned to business writing in 1986 on the Miami Review. Beginning in 1989 he joined Multichannel News where, as financial editor, he covered the cable television industry and related media. In 1996, he became business editor of Broadcasting and Cable.

Higgins covered the cable TV industry in the U.S. from 1989 to 2006. These years saw cable TV revenues more than quadruple, direct-broadcast satellite services beginning to compete with cable, a frequently changing regulatory landscape, a boom affecting the entire telecommunications industry, and the collapse of the boom.

Richard Parsons, CEO of Time Warner, assessed Higgins as "an outstanding journalist and one of the smartest and best-informed reporters on our beat."

A former chairman of the Federal Communications Commission, Richard Wiley, said after Higgins's death: "I thought he was a terrific journalist... He got right to the point. He was a keen analyst, and I will really miss reading his material."

Higgins's writings have frequently been cited in books, and government reports.

== Awards and tributes ==
Broadcasting & Cable published tributes to Higgins after his death. CableFAX reported on a memorial held at MTV headquarters on 12 December 2006. Higgins was posthumously inducted into the Broadcasting & Cable Hall of Fame in 2007.

== John M. Higgins Award for Best In-Depth/Enterprise Reporting ==
Five years after his death, in December 2011, the S.I. Newhouse School of Public Communications at Syracuse University announced the establishment of the John M. Higgins Award for Best In-Depth/Enterprise Reporting. The award, part of the school's annual Mirror Awards for media industry reporting, was co-sponsored by Discovery Communications and Time Warner Cable. The first John M. Higgins Award for Best In-Depth/Enterprise Reporting was presented to Peter Maass on June 13, 2012.
