= Davey Alba =

Technology reporter for Bloomberg

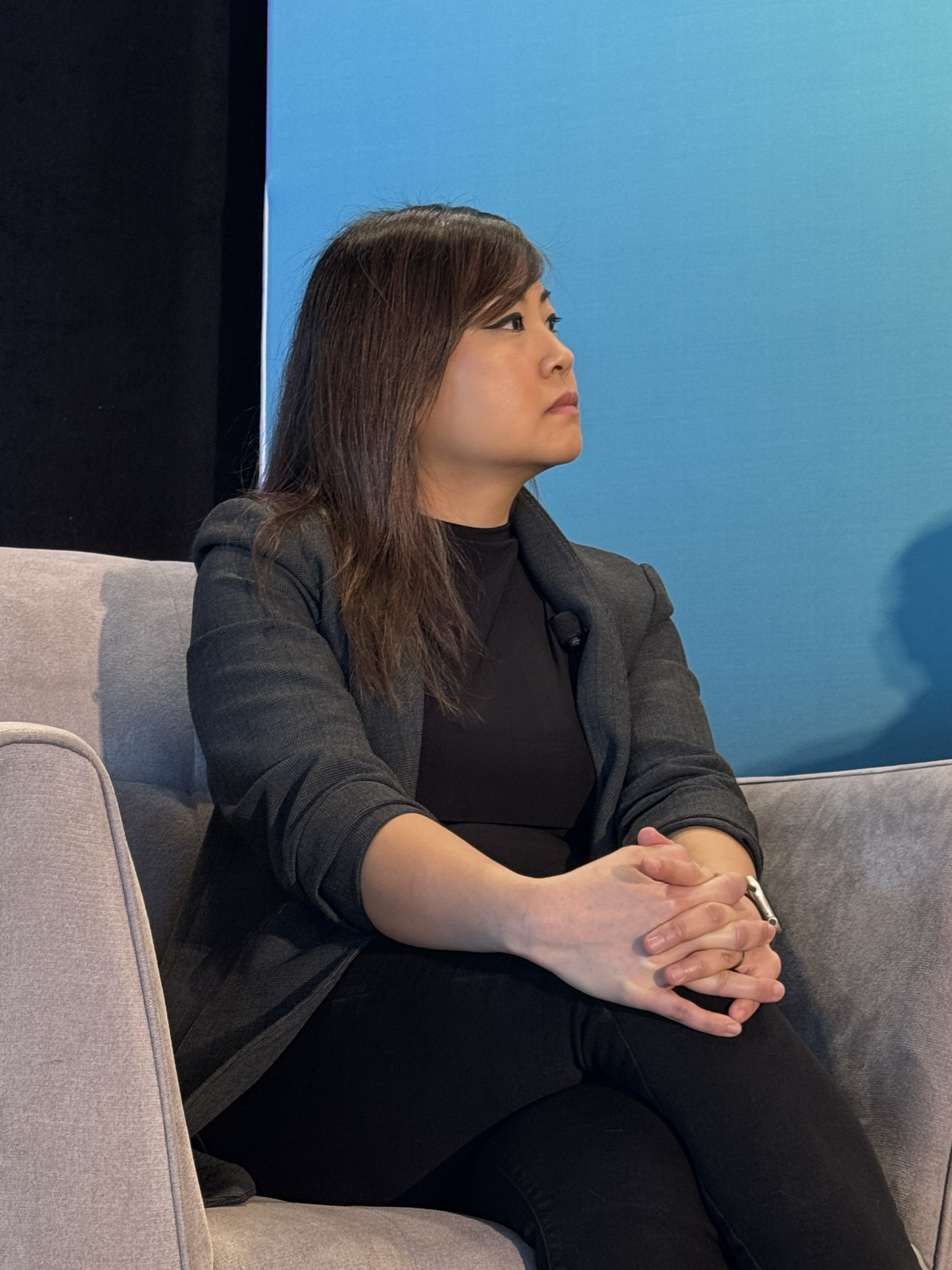
- Education: De La Salle University (BA); Columbia University (MA)
- Occupation: Technology journalism
- Website: daveyalba.com

Davey Alba is a technology reporter who covers Big Tech for Bloomberg News, after previously reporting on online disinformation for The New York Times.

== Early life and education ==
Davey Alba was born in Manila, Philippines, and attended De La Salle University, earning a degree in communication arts. Her father is an academic, mother an economic consultant and her sister is VP of a multi-national investment bank. She came to the United States at age 23 in 2011. She studied at Columbia University and received a master's degree in science journalism.

== Career ==
Alba's first job out of training was at Popular Mechanics; she was technology editor and got to test gadgets and phones. She worked as a technology reporter at BuzzFeed News, Wired and Gizmodo before joining The New York Times as a technology reporter in 2019. Her area of coverage was "disinformation and all of its tentacles." In March, 2022, she joined Bloomberg News, covering Google and Big Tech.

In 2018, working at BuzzFeed News, she reported how Philippine President Rodrigo Duterte used Facebook to gain power in the country. For the BuzzFeed News article on Duterte, Alba won two 2019 awards. She was awarded the Livingston Award for International Reporting, documenting how Facebook ignored fake news, fueled the Filipino drug war, and adversely impacted a vulnerable community by enabling Duterte to manipulate public opinion and win election. After Duterte won, the Facebook machinery of manipulating opinion became a state-sponsored one "to punish opponents, sometimes with death." She won the Mirror Award for Best Story for Journalism in Peril.

After reporting on videos supportive of President Trump's recommendation for the use disinfectants in the treatment of COVID-19, Alba was the target of "weaponized harassment." Alba reports that she was targeted as a reporter who is an immigrant, a woman and a person of color.

In September 2021, Alba interviewed incoming Wikimedia Foundation chief executive officer Maryana Iskander.
