= Albert Allen Bartlett =

American physicist (1923–2013)

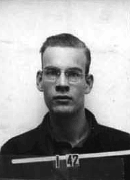
- Bartlett with Los Alamos wartime security badge (c. 1944)
- Born: 21 March 1923; Shanghai, China
- Died: 7 September 2013 (aged 90); Boulder, Colorado, U.S.
- Citizenship: American
- Education: Colgate University (BA); Harvard University (MA, PhD)
- Known for: Population growth Sustainability
- Spouse: Eleanor Bartlett
- Awards: AAPT Distinguished Service Citation (1970); Thomas Jefferson Award (1972); Robert L. Stearns Award (1974); Robert A. Millikan Award (1981); AAPT Melba Newell Phillips Award (1990); M. King Hubbert Award for Excellence in Energy Education (2005); Lifetime Achievement Pacesetter Award (2006); Global Media Award for Excellence in Population Reporting (2008)
- Scientific career
- Fields: Physics
- Workplaces: Los Alamos National Laboratory; University of Colorado Boulder

Albert Allen Bartlett (March 21, 1923 – September 7, 2013) was an American professor of physics at the University of Colorado at Boulder. As of July 2001, Professor Bartlett had lectured over 1,742 times since September 1969 on Arithmetic, Population, and Energy. Bartlett regarded the word combination "sustainable growth" as an oxymoron, and argued that modest annual percentage population increases could lead to exponential growth. He therefore regarded human overpopulation as "The Greatest Challenge" facing humanity.

== Career ==
Bartlett received a B.A. in physics at Colgate University (1944), and an M.A. (1948) and Ph.D. (1951) in physics at Harvard University. Bartlett joined the faculty at the University of Colorado at Boulder in September 1950. In 1978 he was national president of the American Association of Physics Teachers. He was a fellow of the American Physical Society and of the American Association for the Advancement of Science. In 1969 and 1970 he served two terms as the elected chair of the four-campus faculty council at the university. He won the Robert A. Millikan award.

== Views on population growth ==
Graph showing human population growth

Chart showing change in oil prices since the 19th century. The top curve is inflation-adjusted.

World population from 1800 to 2100, based on UN 2004 projections (red, orange, green) and US Census Bureau historical estimates (black)

Bartlett viewed sustainable growth as a contradiction. His view was that modest percentage growth will equate to huge escalations over relatively short periods of time.

Over time, Bartlett argued, compound growth can yield enormous increases. For example, an investor earning a constant annual 7% return on their investment would find his or her capital doubling within 10 years. He applied the same exponential power to human population, and argued this would have calamitous results. He argued that a population of 10,000 individuals, if it were to grow at a constant rate of 7% per annum, would reach a population size of 10 million after 100 years.

Bartlett regarded what he viewed as the failure to understand exponential growth as "The Greatest Challenge" facing humanity, and promoted sustainable living; he was an early advocate on the topic of overpopulation. He opposed the cornucopian school of thought (as advocated by people such as Julian Lincoln Simon), and referred to it as "The New Flat Earth Society".

J. B. Calvert (1999) has proposed that Bartlett's law will result in the exhaustion of petrochemical resources caused by exponential growth of the world population (in line with the Malthusian Growth Model).

Bartlett made statements relating to sustainability:

"The greatest shortcoming of the human race is our inability to understand the exponential function."

and his Great Challenge:

"Can you think of any problem in any area of human endeavor on any scale, from microscopic to global, whose long-term solution is in any demonstrable way aided, assisted, or advanced by further increases in population, locally, nationally, or globally?"

== Death ==
Bartlett died on September 7, 2013, at the age of 90.

== Books ==
- The Essential Exponential For the Future of Our Planet a collection of essays by Professor Bartlett (2004). Center for Science, Mathematics and Computer Education, University of Nebraska-Lincoln. ISBN 0-9758973-0-6

== Influence and legacy ==
In August 2013, a month before Bartlett's death, the Environmental Center at the University of Colorado at Boulder offered training on giving his presentation; the team "came together because they believe so strongly in Dr. Bartlett's message and want to ensure it continues to be delivered well into the future".

== See also ==
- M. King Hubbert, author of the Hubbert Curve.
- Thomas Robert Malthus – the originator of the Malthusian catastrophe argument
- Peak oil
