= Craig Silverman =

Canadian journalist

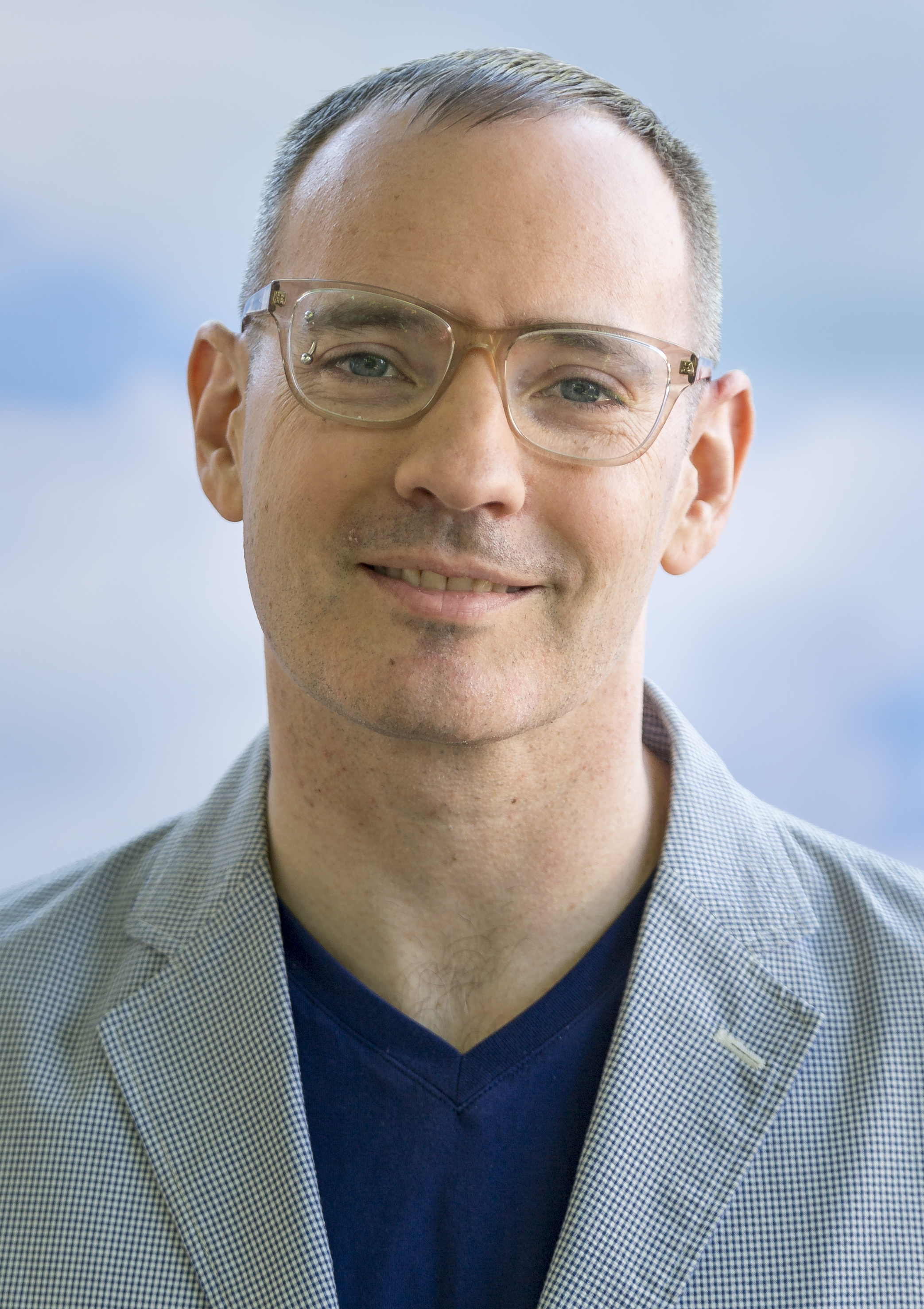
- Silverman in 2017
- Born: Nova Scotia, Canada
- Education: Concordia University
- Occupation: Journalist

Craig Silverman is a Canadian journalist and a reporter at ProPublica. He was previously the media editor of BuzzFeed and the head of BuzzFeed's Canadian division. Known as an expert in "fake news", he founded the "Regret the Error" blog in 2004, covering fact-checking and media inaccuracy, and authored a 2009 book of the same name, which won the Arthur Rowse Award for Press Criticism from the National Press Club.

In 2011, he joined the Poynter Institute for Media Studies as an adjunct faculty member. He also founded the hoax and rumor tracking website Emergent and co-authored a biography of Michael Calce, the hacker known as MafiaBoy. He received a 2013 Mirror Award for Best Commentary, Digital Media.

Born in Nova Scotia, Silverman is a graduate of Concordia University in Montreal (Bachelor of Arts in journalism) and moved to Toronto to join BuzzFeed.
