= Alissa Quart =

American nonfiction writer, critic, journalist, and poet (born 1972)

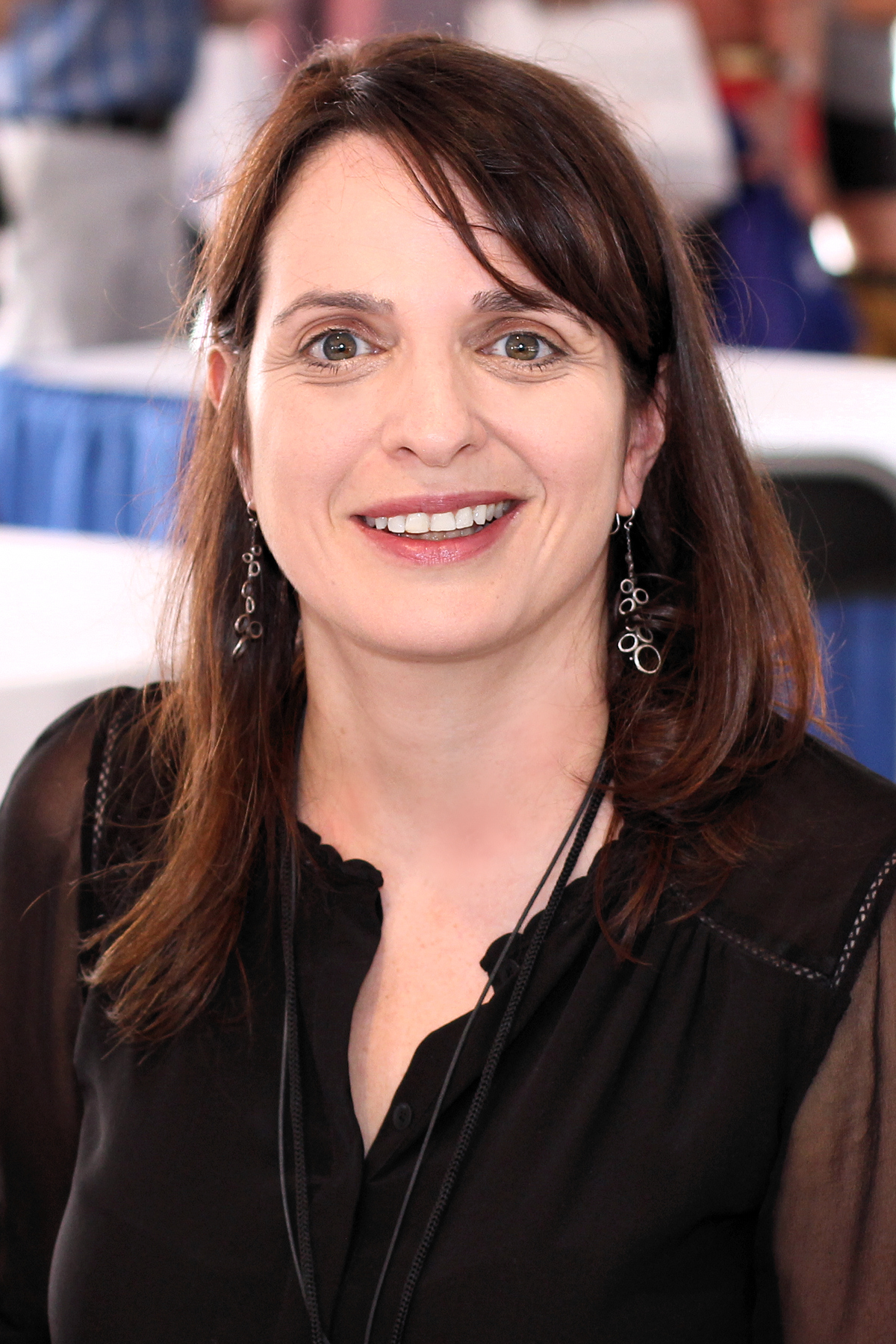
- Quart at the 2018 Texas Book Festival
- Born: 1972 (age 53–54); New York City, U.S.
- Education: BA, Brown University; MS, Columbia Graduate School of Journalism
- Occupations: Journalist; author; poet
- Spouse: Peter Maass
- Children: 1
- Writing career
- Period: 2002–present
- Notable works: Hothouse Kids; Branded; Republic of Outsiders; Squeezed
- Notable awards: Nieman Fellowship, 2010
- Website: www.alissaquart.com

Alissa Quart (born 1972) is an American nonfiction writer, critic, journalist, and poet. Her nonfiction books include Republic of Outsiders: The Power of Amateurs, Dreamers and Rebels (2013), Hothouse Kids: The Dilemma of the Gifted Child (2007), Branded: The Buying and Selling of Teenagers (2003), Squeezed: Why Our Families Can't Afford America (2018), and Bootstrapped: Liberating Ourselves from the American Dream (2023); her two poetry collections are Monetized (2015) and Thoughts and Prayers (2019).

Quart's multimedia story with Maisie Crow, "The Last Clinic" was nominated for a National Magazine Award and a Documentary Emmy in 2014. She was Executive Producer of the film "Jackson" that won an Emmy for Best Documentary, Social Issue. Quart is Executive Director of the Economic Hardship Reporting Project, founded by Barbara Ehrenreich. Quart's articles and reviews have appeared in The New York Times, The Guardian, The Atlantic, and other publications. In a 2005 film review she coined the term hyperlink cinema. She has been a guest commentator on CNN, CBC, and C-SPAN, and appeared on TV shows such as Nightline, 20/20, and Today.

Quart has taught at Brown University and Columbia University's Graduate School of Journalism, and is a 2010 Nieman Fellowship recipient.

== Early life and education ==
Quart was born to Jewish parents, both of whom were college professors. She grew up in lower Manhattan, attending Stuyvesant High School. Quart says that she grew up as a brilliant prodigy. She received a BA in English Literature with Honors in Creative Writing from Brown University in 1994 then did graduate work in English Literature for a year at CUNY Graduate Center before completing a Master of Science at Columbia Graduate School of Journalism in 1997.

== Career ==
Quart is the executive director of the Economic Hardship Reporting Project, a nonprofit organization that funds independent reporters covering social inequality and economic justice. The organization was founded by Barbara Ehrenreich in 2012.

== Books (Nonfiction) ==
=== Branded (2003) ===
In 2003, Quart published Branded: The Buying and Selling of Teenagers which illustrates and criticizes the way that corporations chase teenagers and pre-teens. From the annual Advertising & Promotion to Kids Conference to affiliate programs by catalog retailers such as Delia's that have teenagers advise their friends on what is desirable to Disney and McDonald's holding focus groups in high schools, Quart shows how companies have become increasingly sophisticated in hooking youngsters into a world of extreme consumerism that is ultimately harmful to them socially and developmentally. She points out that companies trap these impressionable individuals "into a cycle of labor and shopping" with brands "aim[ing] to register so strongly in kids' minds that the appeal will remain for life".

The book received generally favorable reviews. Publishers Weekly gave it a starred review, calling it a "substantive follow-up to Naomi Klein's No Logo". It received consistent praise for its analysis from other sources such as The New York Times, The Nation, and the book industry monthly Bookpage.

Branded has been translated into French, German, Spanish, Italian, Japanese, and Finnish.

=== Hothouse Kids (2006) ===
She published Hothouse Kids: The Dilemma of the Gifted Child, a book that examines the cultures of extreme child-rearing that can be found across the U.S. that puts heavy emphasis on early achievement. Quart turns a skeptical eye on the growing genius-building business that includes the Baby Einstein videos, the Scripps National Spelling Bee, and IQ tests. In a book that Publishers Weekly called "first class literary journalism," she paints a somber picture of what the life of a child prodigy really looks like.

Hothouse Kids has been published in South Korea and the UK.

=== Republic of Outsiders (2013) ===
Republic of Outsiders: The Power of Amateurs, Dreamers and Rebels (2013), describes the role of cultural outsiders who are importantly changing elements of mainstream US culture via new technologies and entrepreneurialism. In a book that Publishers Weekly called "thoroughly researched and admirably evenhanded," Quart reports on self-advocacy among people with schizophrenia, bipolar disorder and other mental illnesses that are usually treated with drugs. Instead of allowing doctors to define them, these people espouse “mad pride” and create online communities where peer counseling replaces institutionalization. Quart's point is that all are examples of "counterpublics" who crucially re-form what is considered acceptable, allowing further diversity of options. She ends with a powerful example of Occupy Bank Working Group, or an offshoot of Occupy Wall Street headed by an ex-banker whose goals include to make a nonpredatory credit card for the needy.

In addition to the starred review from Publishers Weekly, the book was reviewed in the Times which Quart's skill in reporting on "the experiences of ordinary people, following their realistically messy lives for year, offering us vivid portraits that are profoundly humane". The book, which was included in the "brilliant" "high brow" quadrant of New York magazine's Approval Matrix, was excerpted in O magazine's August 2013 issue.

=== Squeezed: Why Our Families Can't Afford America (2018) ===
Published in June 2018, Squeezed: Why Our Families Can't Afford America, "brings together original research and reporting to investigate how the high costs of American parenthood have bankrupted the middle class, and examines solutions that might help families across the country". It was reviewed favorably twice by The New York Times, was featured by Terry Gross's Fresh Air, and was chosen as one of C-SPAN's books of the year.

=== Bootstrapped: Liberating Ourselves from the American Dream (2023) ===
Alissa's latest nonfiction book is Bootstrapped: Liberating Ourselves from the American Dream, "an unsparing... yet ultimately hopeful look at how we can shed the American obsession with self-reliance that has made us less healthy, less secure, and less fulfilled." Literary Hub called Bootstrapped one of the "most anticipated books of 2023." A starred review by Publishers Weekly said, "Quart’s vision of an America where no one needs to put on 'codified theatrical performances via social media' to get the help they need is a breath of fresh air. This eloquent and incisive call to action inspires.” Bootstrapped has been reviewed favorably by The Atlantic, Kirkus Reviews, and Jacobin, with excerpts featured in The New York Times, TIME, and The Washington Post.

Kirkus Reviews named Bootstrapped one of the best non-fiction books of 2023.

== Magazine, news and multimedia work ==
She coined the term hyperlink cinema in 2005 while reviewing the film Happy Endings for Film Comment. In her review, she underscored director Don Roos's use of connecting scenes through happenstance, and linking text and captions under or next to a split-screen image. Among the other works she cited as illustrating this technique were the films The Opposite of Sex, Magnolia, Time Code, and Paul Haggis's Crash, and the TV series 24. Hyperlink cinema was further popularized by Roger Ebert in his review of Syriana the same year.

Quart's articles for The New York Times Magazine have included a story about a trans man who was a freshman at Barnard women's college, and a feature on the indie music scene in Toronto.

She has been a newspaper guest columnist, for example, her 2019 New York Times editorial, "The Con of the Side Hustle", criticized the rising popularity of the "side hustle" jargon as being language that "tries to make the dreary carousel of contemporary life sound more fun":

Yet this sales pitch for the "side hustle" takes what we once called, more drably, another job and gives it a gloss, with a tiny shot of Superfly, disguising unstable working hours and a lack of bargaining power as liberation.

Quart commissioned and helped originate Maisie Crow's 50-minute documentary about the Jackson Women's Health Organization, the last abortion clinic in Mississippi, writing its National Magazine Award-nominated multimedia story for the Atavist.

== Poetry ==
Quart was a poet before she became a journalist. Her poetry has been published by the London Review of Books, the Los Angeles Review of Books, and news and culture website the Awl, among other places: In 2002, she came out with a chapbook, Solarized, a lyrically and sonically complex work that shares the thematic preoccupations of her journalism: commercialism, gender identity and being a young woman, gentrification, 1970s and indie film, advertising, adolescence, and bad tourism. Of her writing process, she said in 2014:

"Most of my poems are from experiences at the edges of, say, a reporting trip: the sensory or internal experiences, the physical American landscape I perceive rather than the one that makes it into a piece or a nonfiction book, or the emotional response to a work of art or film I've seen in the course of writing a review or an essay.... I see the 'arguments' in my poetry as being surplus: what is left over or impossible to express or too passionate or even too obvious or familiar in journalistic terms."

=== Monetized (2015) ===
Monetized is her collection of poetry that reflects on consumer identities, Internet culture, gentrification, and "belatedness". Some of the poetry is autobiographical, two are responses to poems by Wallace Stevens. The book was well received by critics, and included in The New York Observer's "Innovation" section and covered by The New Yorker, with Joshua Rothman describing it as "dense, playful, aphoristic." The review in Publishers Weekly praised Quart for "her keen sociological eye" and "remarkably apt cultural critiques". Alternet's Lynn Stuart Parramore wrote, "Quart’s laser-sharp phrases...have a way of sticking around in your head long after you turn the final page.”

== Awards ==
- Nieman Fellowship, 2010
- Pulitzer Center on Crisis Reporting grant, 2013

== Personal life ==
She is married to Peter Maass, a journalist, and they live in New York City.

== Published works ==
=== Poetry ===
- Solarized (2002, chapbook)
- Monetized (2015)
- Thoughts and Prayers (2019)

=== Nonfiction ===
- Branded: The Buying and Selling of Teenagers (2003)
- Hothouse Kids: The Dilemma of the Gifted Child (2007)
- Republic of Outsiders: The Power of Amateurs, Dreamers and Rebels (2013)
- Squeezed: Why Our Families Can't Afford America (2018)
- Bootstrapped: Liberating Ourselves from the American Dream (2023)
