= Joseph Rodriguez (photographer) =

American documentary photographer

Joseph Rodriguez (born 1951) is an American documentary photographer.

== Life and work ==
Rodriguez was born and raised in Brooklyn, New York. He studied photography in the School of Visual Arts and in the Photojournalism and Documentary Photography Program at the International Center of Photography in New York City.

He drove a cab from 1977 to 1985, and in the last two years of which, studying to be a photographer, he photographed while working.

Recent exhibitions of his work have appeared at Galleri Kontrast, Stockholm, Sweden; The African American Museum, Philadelphia, PA; The Fototeca, Havana, Cuba; Birmingham Civil Rights Institute, Birmingham, Alabama, Open Society Institute's Moving Walls, New York; Frieda and Roy Furman Gallery at the Walter Reade Theater at the Lincoln Center; and the Kari Kenneti Gallery Helsinki, Finland.

In 2001 the Juvenile Justice website, featuring Rodriguez's photographs, launched in partnership with the Human Rights Watch International Film Festival High School Pilot Program.

Rodriguez teaches at New York University, the International Center of Photography, New York and has also taught at universities in Mexico and Europe, including Scandinavia.

He received an Alicia Patterson Journalism Fellowship in 1993 to photograph gang families in East Los Angeles.

His work is in the Smithsonian American Art Museum and the National Gallery of Art.

== Publications ==
- A Humanist Gaze. Taschen, 2013.
- Spanish Harlem: El Barrio in the '80s. powerHouse, 2017. ISBN 978-1576878255.
