= Peter Maass =

American journalist

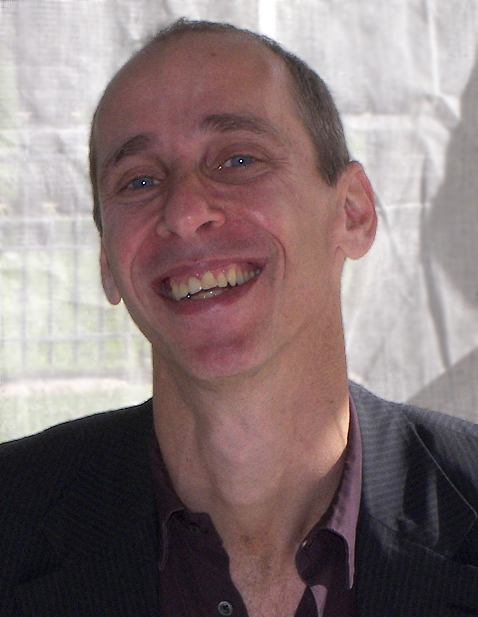
- Peter Maass at the 2009 Texas Book Festival.
- Occupation: Journalist
- Awards: Guggenheim Fellowship (2012); Berlin Prize (2009)
- Website: www.petermaass.com

Peter Maass (born 1960) is an American foreign/war correspondent and investigative journalist.

== Early life and education ==
Maass was born to a Jewish family in Los Angeles. He graduated from the University of California, Berkeley.

== Career ==
Maass has worked for The Wall Street Journal, The New York Times, The Washington Post, and The New York Times Magazine. He has mainly covered international stories and has lived in Belgium, Hungary, and South Korea.

In 1992-93, Maass reported from the Balkans during the Bosnian War, based in Sarajevo. His first book, an award-winning memoir titled Love Thy Neighbor: A Story of War, published in 1996, recounts the horrors he witnessed while covering the conflict.

In 1996, Maass wrote an article for U.S. News & World Report which advocated liberalizing zoning laws to promote affordable housing for lower-income families. In the article he praised Jack Kemp for proposing this idea, which was later rejected by both the George H. W. Bush and the Bill Clinton administrations.

Two years later, Maass reported on the Unification Church for The New Yorker. He interviewed church members in South Korea, the United States and South America, and was one of the few journalists ever permitted to attend church founder Sun Myung Moon's speeches to church members.

In 2003, Maass covered the Iraq War for The New York Times Magazine; he also wrote about his relationship with Iraqi translator and blogger Salam Pax. Later in 2003, Maass wrote a profile of North Korean dictator Kim Jung Il, also for The New York Times Magazine, which was praised for presenting information previously unknown in the English-speaking world.

In 2005, Forbes magazine called Maass the "Dunce of the Week" for a New York Times Magazine cover story which predicted higher oil prices due to increased demand and decreased supply. Forbes also suggested that he had a left-wing political bias in the way he wrote the story. Maass's story indirectly led to the Simmons–Tierney bet. However, despite the mockery from Forbes, Maass' prediction seemed to be fairly accurate as crude oil was at $92.37 per barrel in July 2005 when Maass wrote his magazine story, and by June 2008 it reached a peak of $190.68 per barrel. In 2009, he published a book on the subject titled Crude World: The Violent Twilight of Oil.

Maass resided at the American Academy in Berlin as a fall 2009 Berlin Prize Fellow, where he worked on a book to be titled War of Icons: From Baghdad to Berlin, a Military Writer Looks at How Pictures Frame Wars. (As of 2026, the book has not been published.)

== Recognition ==
On June 13, 2012, Maass received the first John M. Higgins Award for Best In-Depth/Enterprise Reporting.

== Personal life ==
Maass is married to journalist, poet and author Alissa Quart. They live in New York City.
