= Paul H. Silverman =

American medical researcher

- Born: Paul Hyman Silverman; October 8, 1924; Minneapolis, Minnesota, U.S.
- Died: July 16, 2004 (aged 79); Orange, California, U.S.
- Education: Roosevelt University; Northwestern University; Liverpool School of Tropical Medicine
- Known for: Human genome research Criticism of genetic determinism
- Spouse: Nancy Josephs Silverman (m. 1945–2004)
- Children: 2
- Scientific career
- Fields: Epidemiology; Genetics; Parasitology
- Workplaces: University of Illinois Urbana-Champaign; University of New Mexico; State University of New York; University of Maine; Lawrence Berkeley National Laboratory; University of California, Irvine
- Thesis: Studies on the larval stages of some cestodes of the genus taenia (1955)

Paul Hyman Silverman (October 8, 1924 – July 15, 2004) was an American medical researcher in the fields of immunology, epidemiology, and parasitology. He was recognized for his research on stem cells and on the human genome.

== Early life and education ==
Silverman was born on October 8, 1924, in Minneapolis, Minnesota. Growing up, he became fascinated with reading, and he won a local prize for his reading comprehension ability. He attended the University of Minnesota as a pre-medical student while also working three part-time jobs. He went on to serve in a MASH in the United States Army during World War II. He received a bachelor's degree from Roosevelt University. In 1951, Silverman received his M.S. from Northwestern University, after which he moved to Israel with his family. In Israel, he began research on malaria, which he continued to study for many years thereafter. In 1953, he and his family moved again, this time to England. There, he began studying at the Liverpool School of Tropical Medicine, from which he received his Ph.D. in parasitology and epidemiology in 1955.

== Academic career ==
Silverman returned to the United States when he was 39 years old. He then accepted a position at the University of Illinois Urbana-Champaign before moving to the University of New Mexico in 1972. At the University of New Mexico, he and his team developed a killed malaria vaccine based on Jonas Salk's polio vaccine. He became Vice President for Research and Graduate Studies at the University of New Mexico in 1975, and joined the State University of New York as their Provost for Research and Graduate Studies in 1978. In 1980, he became president of the University of Maine, a position he held until 1984. At the University of Maine, he was credited with expanding the scope of research activities. In 1984, he returned to research as a senior scientist at the Lawrence Berkeley National Laboratory. He also served at the University of California, Berkeley as Associate Laboratory Director for Life Sciences and Director of the Donner Lab. In 1987, he helped organize a partnership between the University of California, Berkeley and Lawrence Livermore National Laboratory to establish the first research center dedicated to the study of the human genome. He then worked at Beckman Instruments for several years before being appointed Associate Chancellor for Health Sciences at the University of California, Irvine School of Medicine in 1994, a position he held until his retirement in 1996. Also in 1994, he was elected to the World Academy of Art and Science. In the fall of 2003, he gave the commencement speech to the class of Roosevelt University, from which he received an honorary doctorate of human letters.

== Research and views ==
Silverman was a member of the Human Genome Project's advisory committee. After its results showed that humans had about 30,000 genes, he noted that this suggested that genes were much less important causes of human diseases than previously thought. In an article published in The Scientist shortly before his death, he urged his fellow researchers to abandon genetic determinism, asking, "With only 30,000 genes, what is it that makes humans human?"

== Personal life ==
Silverman met his wife, Nancy Josephs, while he was serving in the Army during World War II. The two married on May 20, 1945, and had two children. Paul Silverman died on July 15, 2004, of complications resulting from a bone marrow transplant he had received to treat his myelofibrosis.
