= Simon–Ehrlich wager =

1980 scientific wager

The Simon–Ehrlich wager was a 1980 scientific wager between economist Julian Simon and biologist Paul Ehrlich, betting on a mutually agreed-on measure of natural-resource scarcity over the decade leading up to 1990. The widely followed contest originated in the pages of Social Science Quarterly, where Simon challenged Ehrlich to put his money where his mouth was. In response to Ehrlich's published claim that "If I were a gambler, I would take even money that England will not exist in the year 2000", Simon offered to take that bet, or, more realistically, "to stake US$10,000 ... on my belief that the cost of non-government-controlled raw materials (including grain and oil) will not rise in the long run".

Simon challenged Ehrlich to choose any raw material he wanted and a date more than a year away, and he would wager on the inflation-adjusted prices decreasing as opposed to increasing. Ehrlich chose copper, chromium, nickel, tin, and tungsten. The bet was formalized on September 29, 1980, with September 29, 1990, as the payoff date. Ehrlich lost the bet, as all five commodities that were bet on declined in price from 1980 through 1990, the wager period.

== Background ==
In 1968 Ehrlich published The Population Bomb, which argued that mankind was facing a demographic catastrophe with the rate of population growth quickly outstripping growth in the supply of food and resources. Simon was highly skeptical of such claims, so he proposed a wager, telling Ehrlich to select any raw material he wanted and select "any date more than a year away," and Simon would bet that the commodity's price on that date would be lower than what it was at the time of the wager.

=== Terms of the wager ===
Ehrlich and his colleagues picked five metals that they thought would undergo big price increases: chromium, copper, nickel, tin, and tungsten. Then, on paper, they bought $200 worth of each, for a total bet of $1,000, using the prices on September 29, 1980, as an index. They designated September 29, 1990, 10 years hence, as the payoff date. If the inflation-adjusted price of the basket rose above $1,000, Simon would pay Ehrlich the difference. If the prices fell, Ehrlich et al. would pay Simon.

=== Outcome ===
Between 1980 and 1990 the world's population grew by more than 800 million, the largest increase in one decade in all of history. But by September 1990, the price of each of Ehrlich's selected metals had fallen. Chromium, which had sold for $3.90 a pound in 1980 (equivalent to $15.24 in 2025), was down to $3.70 in 1990 (equivalent to $9.12 in 2025). Tin, which was $8.72 a pound in 1980 (equivalent to $34.07 in 2025), was down to $3.88 a decade later (equivalent to $9.56 in 2025).

As a result, in October 1990 Paul Ehrlich mailed Julian Simon a check for $576.07 (equivalent to $1,419.63 in 2025) to settle the wager in Simon's favor.

== Analysis ==
Julian Simon won because the price of three of the five metals went down in nominal terms and all five of the metals fell in price in inflation-adjusted terms, with both tin and tungsten falling by more than half. In his book Betrayal of Science and Reason, Ehrlich wrote that Simon asserted "that humanity would never run out of anything". Ehrlich added that he and fellow scientists viewed renewable resources as more important indicators of the state of planet Earth, but that he decided to go along with the bet anyway. Afterward, Simon offered to raise the wager to $20,000 and to use any resources at any time that Ehrlich preferred. Ehrlich countered with a challenge to bet that temperatures would increase in the future. The two were unable to reach an agreement on the terms of a second wager before Simon died.

Some observers have argued that Ehrlich could have won if the bet had been for a different period, or if the start date had been different. Ehrlich wrote that the five metals in question had increased in price between the years 1950 and 1975. Asset manager Jeremy Grantham wrote that if the Simon-Ehrlich wager had been for a longer period (from 1980 to 2011), then Simon would have lost on four of the five metals. Economist Mark J. Perry noted that for an even longer period of time, from 1934 to 2013, the inflation-adjusted price of the Dow Jones-AIG Commodities Index showed "an overall significant downward trend" and concluded that Simon was "more right than lucky".

Kiel et al. (2010) claimed that when considering all possible time periods from 1900 to 2008, Simon would have won the bet in only 38.4% of all cases, while Ehrlich would not only have won more often but also by a wide margin. They viewed the period from 1980 to 1990, during which the bet was active, as one of the 15 worst periods over the entire study period from 1900 to 2008. Contrary to popular public opinion, they posited, the conclusion of the bet is not that there is no such thing as a shortage of raw materials, but rather that when it comes to betting, it is better to have luck on your side than expertise. Lawn (2010) concurs, and concludes that the wager does not indicate that there are not environmental limits to growth.

== The proposed second wager ==
Understanding that Simon wanted to bet again, Ehrlich and climatologist Stephen Schneider counter-offered, challenging Simon to bet on 15 current trends, betting $1,000 that each will get worse (as in the previous wager) over a ten-year future period.

The bets were:

- The three years 2002–2004 will, on average, be warmer than 1992–1994.
- There will be more carbon dioxide in the atmosphere in 2004 than in 1994.
- There will be more nitrous oxide in the atmosphere in 2004 than 1994.
- The concentration of ozone in the lower atmosphere (the troposphere) will be greater than in 1994.
- Emissions of the air pollutant sulfur dioxide in Asia will be significantly greater in 2004 than in 1994.
- There will be less fertile cropland per person in 2004 than in 1994.
- There will be less agricultural soil per person in 2004 than 1994.
- There will be on average less rice and wheat grown per person in 2002–2004 than in 1992–1994.
- In developing nations there will be less firewood available per person in 2004 than in 1994.
- The remaining area of virgin tropical moist forests will be significantly smaller in 2004 than in 1994.
- The oceanic fishery harvest per person will continue its downward trend and, thus, in 2004, will be smaller than in 1994.
- There will be fewer plant and animal species still extant in 2004 than in 1994.
- More people will die of AIDS in 2004 than in 1994.
- Between 1994 and 2004, sperm cell counts of human males will continue to decline, and reproductive disorders will continue to increase.
- The gap in wealth between the richest 10% of humanity and the poorest 10% will be greater in 2004 than in 1994.

Simon declined Ehrlich and Schneider's offer to bet, and used the following analogy to explain why he did so:

Let me characterize their offer as follows. I predict, and this is for real, that the average performances in the next Olympics will be better than those in the last Olympics. On average, the performances have gotten better, Olympics to Olympics, for a variety of reasons. What Ehrlich and others says [sic] is that they don't want to bet on athletic performances, they want to bet on the conditions of the track, or the weather, or the officials, or any other such indirect measure.

In his 1981 book The Ultimate Resource, Simon noted that not all decreases in resources or increases in unwanted effects correspond to overall decreases in human wellbeing. Hence, there can be an "optimal level of pollution", which accepts some increases in certain kinds of pollution in a way that increases overall wellbeing while acknowledging that any increase in pollution is nevertheless a cost that must be considered in any such calculation. Simon's theory of resource development actually predicts some of the aforementioned trends, which do not in and of themselves even qualify as costs (unlike pollution). E.g., he pointed out that, due to increased efficiency, the amount of cropland required and actually used to grow food for each person has decreased over time and is likely to continue to do so. The same might potentially be true of decreased reliance on firewood in developing countries and per capita use of specific food sources like rice, wheat, and fish if economic development makes a diverse range of alternative foods available. Some have also proven false, e.g., the amount of ozone in the lower atmosphere has decreased from 1994 to 2004.

If Simon had taken the bet, he would have lost on 11 out of 15 trends.

== Other wagers ==
In 1996 Simon bet $1,000 with David South, professor of the Auburn University School of Forestry, that the inflation-adjusted price of timber would decrease in the following five years. Simon paid out early on the bet in 1997 (before his death in 1998) based on his expectation that prices would remain above 1996 levels (which they did).

In 1999, when The Economist headlined an article entitled, "$5 a barrel oil soon?" and with oil trading in the $12/barrel range, David South offered $1,000 to any economist who would bet with him that the price of oil would be greater than $12/barrel in 2010. No economist took him up on the offer. However, in October 2000, Zagros Madjd-Sadjadi, an economist with The University of the West Indies, bet $1,000 with David South that the inflation-adjusted price of oil would decrease to an inflation-adjusted price of $25 by 2010 (down from what was then $30/barrel). Madjd-Sadjadi paid South an inflation-adjusted $1,242 in January 2010. The price of oil at the time was $81/barrel.

== See also ==
- Long Bet Project
- Malthusian catastrophe
- Oil price increases since 2003
- Peak oil
- Richard Rainwater
- Simmons–Tierney bet
- Scientific wager
