= Maisie Crow =

American documentary filmmaker and photojournalist

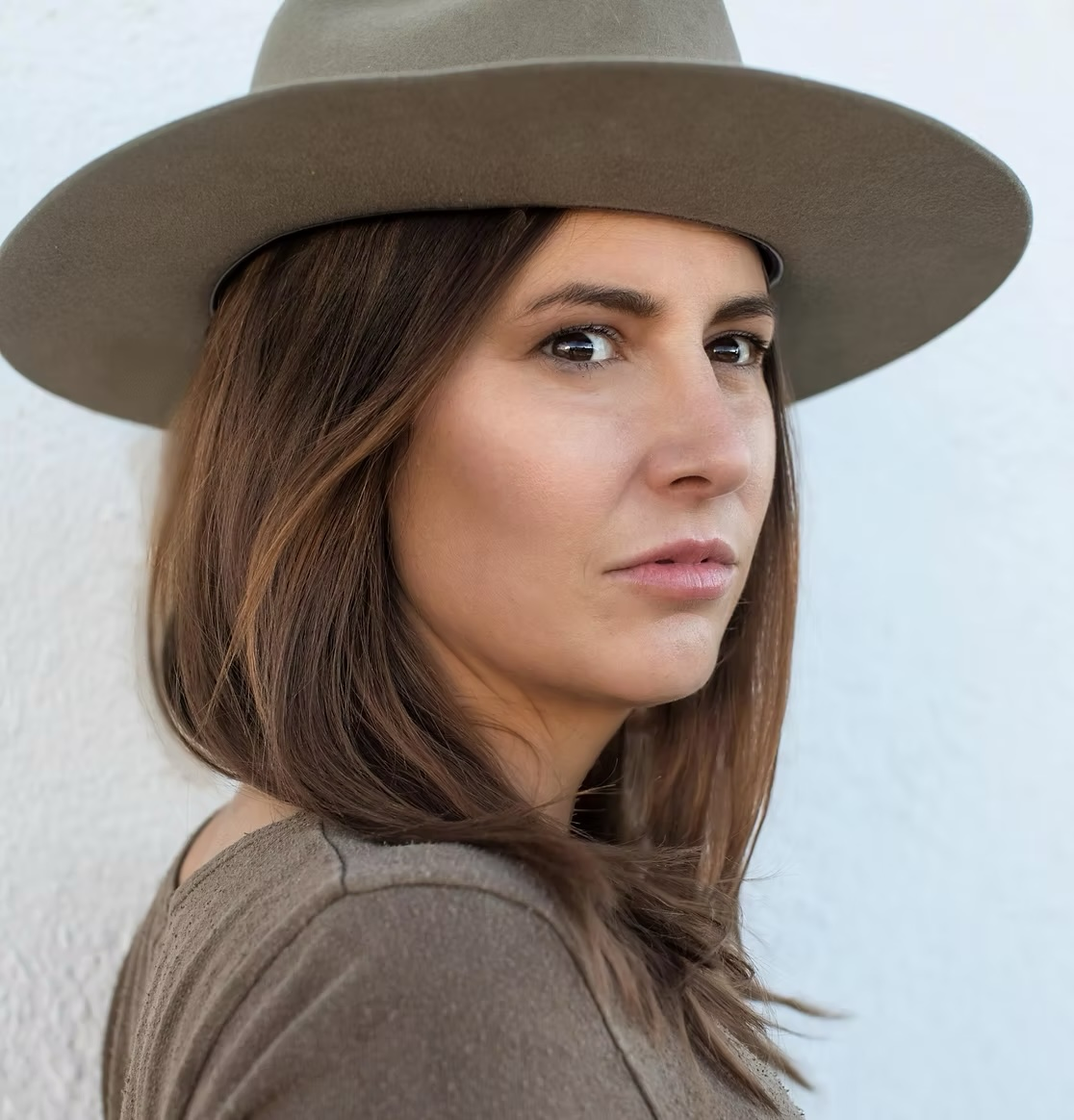
- Maisie Crow in 2020
- Born: Corpus Christi, Texas, U.S.
- Education: University of Texas at Austin; Ohio University
- Occupations: Documentary filmmaker; photojournalist; journalist
- Years active: 2009–present

Maisie Crow is an American documentary filmmaker, photojournalist, and journalist based in Austin and Marfa, Texas. Beginning her career as a photojournalist, she has evolved into a documentary filmmaker known for character-driven work on social justice subjects, particularly reproductive rights and U.S.-Mexico border issues. Her feature documentary Jackson (2016) won the News & Documentary Emmy Award for Outstanding Social Issue Documentary. Her second feature, At the Ready (2021), premiered in competition at the Sundance Film Festival. Her third feature, Zurawski v Texas (2024), co-directed with Abbie Perrault, premiered at the Telluride Film Festival and was executive produced by Hillary Clinton, Chelsea Clinton, and Jennifer Lawrence. She was also co-owner and editor of the Big Bend Sentinel, a weekly newspaper in Marfa, Texas, from 2019 to 2025.

== Early life and education ==
Crow was born and raised in Corpus Christi, Texas. She earned a Bachelor of Science in Journalism from the University of Texas at Austin, where she contributed to The Daily Texan, and a master's degree in photojournalism from Ohio University, where she was named runner-up for the College Photographer of the Year award. She also studied at the Salt Institute for Documentary Studies and completed internships at the Vail Daily, the Tico Times in Costa Rica, MediaStorm, and the Boston Globe.

== Career ==
=== Photojournalism ===
Crow started her career as a photojournalist, contributing work to publications including The New York Times, The Atlantic, ProPublica, Esquire, and The Intercept. In 2009, she received the Ian Parry Scholarship for Love Me, a long-term documentary photography project documenting a young woman living in a cycle of generational poverty in Ohio, which she has described as "the first time my work was recognized on such a large scale." Her multimedia work has been recognized by World Press Photo, the Overseas Press Club, and the Society of Professional Journalists.

=== Short documentaries ===
Crow's short documentary A Life Alone (2009), a portrait of a widowed farmer confronting solitude after 63 years of marriage, received a News & Documentary Emmy Award nomination in 2010.

Her short film Half-Lives: The Chernobyl Workers Now (2011) documented survivors and workers still dismantling the Chernobyl plant 25 years after the disaster. The film won the Overseas Press Club Award for Best Use of Online Video in 2012 and was recognized by the World Press Photo Multimedia Contest, Pictures of the Year International, and Best of Photojournalism.

In 2013, Crow directed The Last Clinic, a short documentary about Mississippi's last remaining abortion clinic, published by The Atavist Magazine. The film received a News & Documentary Emmy Award nomination in 2014 and was named a finalist for the National Magazine Award.

=== Jackson (2016) ===
Crow's feature directorial debut, Jackson, follows three women on different sides of the abortion debate in Jackson, Mississippi: Shannon Brewer, director of the Jackson Women's Health Organization — Mississippi's last abortion clinic — Barbara Beaver, leader of an anti-abortion pregnancy center, and April Jackson, a young mother of four facing an unplanned pregnancy.

The film had its world premiere at the Los Angeles Film Festival in June 2016 and screened at over 40 festivals, including the Human Rights Watch Film Festival. It won 15 festival awards including Best Documentary at the New Orleans Film Festival, Indie Memphis, the Portland Film Festival, and the Hot Springs Documentary Film Festival. The film won the News & Documentary Emmy Award for Outstanding Social Issue Documentary in 2018.

=== At the Ready (2021) ===
Crow's second feature, At the Ready, follows three Mexican-American high school students at Horizon High School in El Paso, Texas who participate in a law enforcement training program, aspiring to careers in border patrol, customs enforcement, and law enforcement. The film's subjects — Cristina, Cesar, and Kassy — navigate the tension between their career ambitions and the national debate over immigration and policing. One of the film's subjects, identified as Kassy during production, came out as transgender, a fact noted in the film's end credits.

The film premiered in the U.S. Documentary Competition at the Sundance Film Festival in January 2021 and opened theatrically on October 22, 2021. The film received development support from the Catapult Film Fund. Writing in The Hollywood Reporter, Daniel Fienberg reviewed the film positively at Sundance. The film is listed in the International Documentary Association project database and streams on Max.

=== The Pink House at the Center of the World (2022) ===
Crow contributed video reporting to This American Life's episode 774, "The Pink House at the Center of the World" (2022), documenting the staff of the Jackson Women's Health Organization as they reacted to the Supreme Court's decision in Dobbs v. Jackson Women's Health Organization overturning Roe v. Wade. The episode won a Peabody Award in 2022.

=== Zurawski v Texas (2024) ===
Crow co-directed Zurawski v Texas (2024) with Abbie Perrault. The film follows three women who were denied medically necessary abortion care under Texas's abortion ban and subsequently sued the state with the Center for Reproductive Rights. The documentary was executive produced by Hillary Clinton, Chelsea Clinton, and Jennifer Lawrence.

The film had its world premiere at the Telluride Film Festival in 2024, where it played to a capacity crowd of approximately 700 people and received standing ovations. The Los Angeles Times described it as "the film that landed hardest" of those screened at the festival. It won the Artemis Rising Foundation Award for Social Impact, which carries a $15,000 cash prize, at the Hamptons International Film Festival. The film also won both the Jury Prize and the Audience Award for Best Southern Feature at the Hot Springs Documentary Film Festival. The film was longlisted for the 2025 Grierson Awards for Best Crime and Justice Documentary and was named one of the best documentaries of 2024 by Variety, IndieWire, and The Hollywood Reporter. The film opened theatrically on October 25, 2024. The Center for Reproductive Rights has cited the film in its advocacy work.

== The Big Bend Sentinel ==
In April 2019, Crow and her husband Max Kabat purchased the Big Bend Sentinel, a weekly newspaper serving Marfa and surrounding Big Bend communities, as well as its sister publication the Presidio International. Crow served as editor and publisher. In September 2025, ownership of the newspaper transferred to a nonprofit organization.

== Teaching ==
Crow has taught photojournalism and video storytelling as an adjunct professor at Columbia University Graduate School of Journalism, the CUNY Graduate School of Journalism, and the Salt Institute for Documentary Studies. She has also served as a Hearst Visitor at Pennsylvania State University's Bellisario College of Communications.

== Filmography ==
=== Feature documentaries ===
Year	Title	Director	Producer	Notes
2016	Jackson	Yes	Yes	World premiere Los Angeles Film Festival 2016; News & Documentary Emmy Award for Outstanding Social Issue Documentary (2018); 15 festival awards
2021	At the Ready	Yes	Yes	U.S. Documentary Competition, Sundance Film Festival 2021; streams on Max
2024	Zurawski v Texas	Yes	Yes	Co-directed with Abbie Perrault; world premiere Telluride Film Festival 2024; Artemis Rising Foundation Award, Hamptons International Film Festival; Jury Prize and Audience Award, Hot Springs Documentary Film Festival

=== Short documentaries ===
Year	Title	Director	Notes
2009	A Life Alone	Yes	News & Documentary Emmy Award nomination (2010)
2011	Half-Lives: The Chernobyl Workers Now	Yes	Overseas Press Club Award for Best Use of Online Video (2012)
2013	The Last Clinic	Yes	Published by The Atavist Magazine; News & Documentary Emmy Award nomination (2014); National Magazine Award finalist

=== Television and multimedia contributions ===
Year	Title	Role	Notes
2022	"The Pink House at the Center of the World" (This American Life, Episode 774)	Video reporter	Peabody Award (2022)
