= Julian Simon =

American economist (1932–1998)

- Born: February 12, 1932; Newark, New Jersey, U.S.
- Died: February 8, 1998 (aged 65); Chevy Chase, Maryland, U.S.
- Known for: Simon–Ehrlich wager
- Spouse: Rita J. Simon

Academic background
- Education: Harvard University (BA); University of Chicago (MBA, PhD)

Academic work
- Discipline: Applied economics; Business economics; Environmental economics
- School or tradition: Chicago School of Economics
- Institutions: University of Illinois; Hebrew University of Jerusalem; University of Maryland; Cato Institute
- Notable works: The Ultimate Resource (1981)

Julian Lincoln Simon (February 12, 1932 – February 8, 1998) was an American economist. He was a professor of economics and business administration at the University of Illinois from 1963 to 1983 before later moving to the University of Maryland, where he taught for the remainder of his academic career.

Simon wrote many books and articles, mostly on economic subjects, from an optimistic viewpoint. He is best known for his work on population, natural resources, and immigration. Simon is sometimes associated with cornucopian views and as a critic of Malthusianism. Rather than focus on the abundance of nature, Simon focused on lasting economic benefits from continuous population growth, even despite limited or finite physical resources, primarily by the power of human ingenuity to create substitutes, and from technological progress.

He is also known for the famous Simon–Ehrlich wager, a bet he made with ecologist Paul R. Ehrlich. Ehrlich bet that the prices for five metals would increase over a decade, while Simon took the opposite stance. Simon won the bet, as the prices for the metals sharply declined during that decade.

== Early life and education ==
Simon was born in Newark, New Jersey, on February 12, 1932. He grew up in a Jewish family that migrated to Newark as part of a wave of Jews who moved into the suburbs. His grandparents owned a hardware store in the city's downtown. In 1941, he moved with his parents to Millburn, New Jersey, where they experienced significant financial insecurity. At the age of 12, Simon became estranged from his father, who he saw as distant "except when I did something that annoyed him." He developed a closer relationship with his mother and two aunts. Reflecting on his childhood, Simon later recalled that he had "little joy" and fewer "celebrations and happy moments."

At the age of 14, Simon joined the Boy Scouts of America and became an Eagle Scout. His experience being hazed as a scout influenced a worldview which disliked elitism and sympathized with what he described as "the struggling poor, the powerless, and those denied opportunity by circumstance." He was educated at the local Millburn High School. In his autobiography, A Life Against the Grain, Simon wrote that "I first learned to say 'Do you want to bet?'" when arguing with his father: "He would say outrageously wrong things in an authoritative fashion and refuse to hear any questions. There really was nothing I could say except 'Do you want to bet?'"

After high school, Simon studied experimental psychology as an undergraduate at Harvard University, where he also took graduate courses in the subject and graduated with a Bachelor of Arts (B.A.) in 1953. At Harvard, Simon was a member of its Reserve Officers' Training Corps program and attended on a full scholarship provided by the Holloway Plan. He was also active as a member of the university's debate team. To help defray his expenses, Simon worked various jobs—including those as a salesman, clerk, and factory worker—and used his winnings from daily poker games. Among his close friends in college was sculptor Aristides Demetrios.

From 1953 to 1956, Simon served as an officer in the U.S. Navy on USS Samuel B. Roberts. He was also stationed at Camp Lejeune in North Carolina for the U.S. Marine Corps. In 1957, he began graduate studies at the University of Chicago, where he received a Master of Business Administration (M.B.A.) in 1959 and a Ph.D. in business economics in 1961. He came under the influence of economists Milton Friedman, Friedrich Hayek, and Theodore Schultz, who were all based at the university. His dissertation, completed under Herman H. Fussler, was titled, "Economics of book storage plans for a university library".

== Career ==
From 1961 to 1963, Simon operated Julian Simon Associates, an agency for mail-orders and advertising. He had moved to New York with his wife, Rita James, to start a business. However, he complained of his encounters with regulatory restrictions, which he called "tyranny of bureaucracy." Simon resolved to write a book about direct mail. The resulting book, How to Start and Operate a Mail Order Business, was first published in 1965 and subsequently revised in four later editions, the last of which appeared in 1993. This work sold more copies than any subsequent book of his.

While running his agency, he also sought an academic position. During a time of rapid expansion among universities, he obtained a position as a professor of advertising at the University of Illinois Urbana-Champaign. His time owning a personal business would have an effect on his economic perspectives.

Simon would spend most of his adult life in academia. He published widely on topics concerning advertising and marketing, later broadly researching subjects from library storage to suicide to airline overbooking. At the University of Illinois, he switched in 1966 to teach marketing there. His research focuses also shifted towards addressing population growth. Simon used his previous experience in marketing towards promoting birth control; articles he published recommended campaigns for family planning. He drew the attention of W. Parker Mauldin of the Population Council, who arranged for him to visit India to research possible ways to advertise birth control. His initial assumptions held that an increasing population were accompanied by serious economic threats. After calculating the costs and benefits of family planning, he concluded that countries could gain financially by averting births and advocated stronger investments in planning programs.

Essays by economists Simon Kuznets and Richard Easterlin in 1967 greatly influenced Simon, who began to be increasingly skeptical about the implications of population growth as he researched fertility rates. Kuznets and Easterlin argued that the historical data demonstrated that population growth had no negative effect on economic growth; Simon credited their findings as leading to his skeptic outlook. He also came to be influenced by Danish economist Ester Boserup, who found that, in contrast to Thomas Malthus, a growing population determined the most efficient agricultural practices. During a 1969 visit to Washington, D.C., Simon experienced an epiphany at the Marine Corps War Memorial. He later wrote: "And then I thought, Have I gone crazy? What business do I have trying to help arrange it that fewer human beings will be born, each one of whom might be a Mozart or a Michelangelo or an Einstein—or simply a joy to his or her family and community and a person who will enjoy life?"

In February 1970, Simon took the place of psychiatrist Robert Jay Lifton to speak at a faculty forum in his home city of Urbana, Illinois. His talk was titled "Science Does Not Show There Is Over-Population." He declared, "I view the population explosion not as a disaster, but as a triumph for mankind. Whether population growth is too fast or too slow is a value judgment, not a scientific one." The talk gained attention among his colleagues, and he was invited to speak at the 1970 Earth Day in Urbana. Simon spoke to a large audience; after Planned Parenthood president Alan Frank Guttmacher finished giving his address, Simon delivered his skeptical view questioning whether growth and scarcity posed a threat to society. Biology professor and colleague Paul Silverman soon rose to the podium and denounced Simon's remarks, while Simon was beside him. Silverman called him a "false prophet" who "lacks scholarship or substance." The event stayed with Simon, who now held a grudge against Silverman. Two weeks later, he soused Silverman at a faculty party and the two scuffled. The Washington Post wrote in 1985 that the incident launched Simon's "intellectual war."

In 1969, Simon was named as a professor of economics and business administration at the University of Illinois, and would remain in that position until 1983. From 1970 to 1971 and 1974–75, he was a visiting professor at the Hebrew University of Jerusalem. In the early 1970s, Simon's academic work largely concerned the relationship between population and fertility. He wrote primarily in economic, demographic, and developmental journals. By 1975, his published articles argued that there were economic gains from population growth, contrary to assumptions that growth led to reduced investment. They came amid growing fears by environmental activists, who drew from biologist Paul R. Ehrlich's 1968 book, The Population Bomb, and the Club of Rome's 1972 report, The Limits to Growth. By then, the view of scarcity among economists such as Simon, Robert Solow, and William Nordhaus differed from ecologists. Economists posited that scarcity was a changing, dynamic variable rather than the more commonly espoused view among scientists that it was a constraint which caused an ecological collapse.

Simon took an aggressive approach in attacking what had been the dominant consensus on population growth. He issued rhetorical challenges that distinguished him from and went further than other economists. A stronger belief in the free market also set him apart from Nordhaus and Solow, who were part of the mainstream. Political progressives and environmentalists saw his views as being overly-optimistic. Even as environmental pessimists gained greater influence in policy decisions under President Jimmy Carter, Simon and other optimists intensified their criticisms of population control and environmental regulations.

Simon moved in 1983 to join the faculty of the University of Maryland, College Park, as a professor in its Robert H. Smith School of Business, where he remained for the rest of his academic career. He was a member of the American Economics Association, the American Statistics Association, and the Population Association of America.

== Wagers with Ehrlich ==
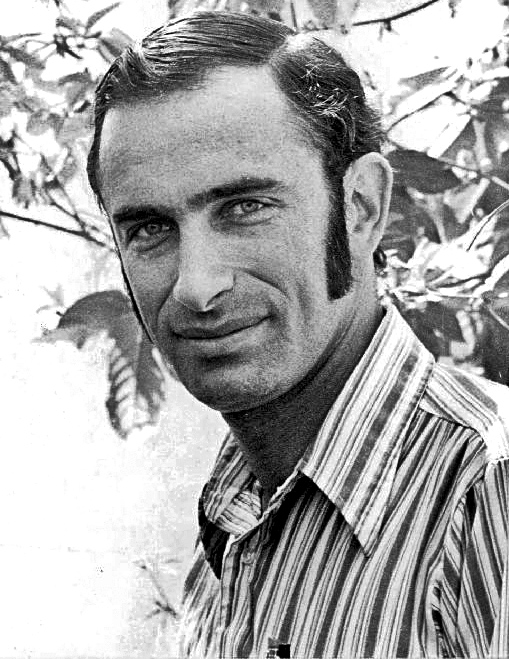
Scientist Paul R. Ehrlich (pictured in 1974) predicted that multiple crises would occur in the 1970s, including a dramatic decrease in life expectancy and the need for food rationing.

Simon and Paul R. Ehrlich first directly encountered each other in the summer of 1980, when Simon vehemently debunked claims by Newsweek and the United Nations, both of which had overestimated the death toll caused by a drought in West Africa from 1968 to 1973. His rebuttals, published in Science journal and The Washington Post, were also aimed at environmental doomers. Simon rejected Ehrlich's claim in The Population Bomb that limited food supply may necessarily require population control and also rejected that humanity was reaching its ecological limit, a claim popularized by The Limits of Growth. He blamed the popularity for such exaggerated assertions as "bad news sells books, newspapers, and magazines." Simon explained that technological advancements would alleviate scarcity because "we find new lodes, invent better production methods, and discover new substitutes."

In December 1980, Ehrlich and his wife, Anne Ehrlich, along with colleagues John Holdren and John Harte, issued criticisms in Science of Simon's rebuttals. Arguing that technology was not sufficient to replace essential ecological systems, they asserted that a scarcity of energy and minerals remained a present danger. They dismissed Simon's writing as being a "tired old argument" with "striking misconceptions" which reflected economists "who know nothing about geology." Biologist Wayne Davis at the University of Kentucky disputed a claim made by Simon's article that oil prices would decrease, saying it "defies logic." Ehrlich and Simon's dispute would continue into the next year, with additional publications against each other in Social Science Quarterly. Simon wrote in 1981, "How often does a prophet have to be wrong before we no longer believe that he or she is a true prophet?"

Simon believed that Ehrlich's assumptions about demographics were erroneous and that his public statements had not experienced the "consequences of being wrong." In 1969, Ehrlich said that "If I were a gambler, I would take even money that England will not exist in the year 2000." He predicted that in the absence of global population control, widespread nuclear war, disease, scarcity, or dire resource scarcity would occur as a result of overpopulation. Ehrlich garnered broad public attention for his views and disseminated his concerns in the Saturday Review, Playboy, Penthouse, and on The Tonight Show Starring Johnny Carson, where he was a frequent guest and had at least 20 appearances. In 1970, Ehrlich delivered 100 public lectures and appeared on 200 radio and television shows. His highly publicized engagements earned him celebrity status as a scientist. Simon later recalled of Ehrlich: "Here was a guy reaching a vast audience, leading his juggernaut of environmentalist hysteria, and I felt utterly helpless."

Wanting to "put my money where my mouth is," Simon challenged Ehrlich to a scientific wager to test their theories regarding future resource abundance, betting on the future prices of raw material. If Ehrlich's belief that population growth would increase scarcity was correct, then the prices of the metals would increase due to heightened demand. Simon believed that technological advancements would reduce scarcity and so he predicted a decrease in prices over time. Ehrlich agreed to the offer. He commented that he would accept Simon's "astonishing offer before other greedy people jump in." He consulted Harte and Holdren to devise a basket of five metals that they thought would rise in price with increasing scarcity and depletion. They chose chromium, copper, nickel, tin, and tungsten. Simon ultimately won the bet, with all five metals dropping in price.

- The price of tin went down because of an increased use of aluminium, a much more abundant, useful and inexpensive material.
- Better mining technologies allowed for the discovery of vast nickel lodes, which ended the near monopoly that was enjoyed on the market.
- Tungsten fell due to the rise of the use of ceramics in cookware.
- The price of chromium fell due to better smelting techniques.
- The price of copper began to fall due to the invention of fiber-optic cable (which is derived from sand), which serves a number of the functions once reserved only for copper wire.

In all of these cases, better technology allowed for either more efficient use of existing resources, or substitution with a more abundant and less expensive resource, as Simon predicted.

=== Proposed second wager ===
In 1995, Simon issued a challenge for a second bet. Ehrlich declined, and proposed instead that they bet on a metric for human welfare. Ehrlich offered Simon a set of 15 metrics over 10 years, victor to be determined by scientists chosen by the president of the National Academy of Sciences in 2005. There was no meeting of minds, because Simon felt that too many of the metrics measured attributes of the world that were not directly related to human welfare, e.g. the amount of nitrous oxide in the atmosphere. For such indirect, supposedly bad indicators to be considered "bad", they would ultimately have to have some measurable detrimental effect on actual human welfare. Ehrlich refused to leave out measures considered by Simon to be immaterial.

Simon summarized the bet with the following analogy:

Let me characterize their [Ehrlich and Schneider's] offer as follows. I predict, and this is for real, that the average performances in the next Olympics will be better than those in the last Olympics. On average, the performances have gotten better, Olympics to Olympics, for a variety of reasons. What Ehrlich and others say is that they don't want to bet on athletic performances, they want to bet on the conditions of the track, or the weather, or the officials, or any other such indirect measure.

== Theory ==
Simon's 1981 book The Ultimate Resource is a criticism of what was then the conventional wisdom on resource scarcity, published within the context of the cultural background created by the best-selling and highly influential book The Population Bomb in 1968 by Paul R. Ehrlich and The Limits to Growth analysis published in 1972. The Ultimate Resource challenged the conventional wisdom on population growth, raw-material scarcity and resource consumption. Simon argues that our notions of increasing resource scarcity ignore the long-term declines in wage-adjusted raw material prices. Viewed economically, he argues, increasing wealth and technology make more resources available; although supplies may be limited physically they may be regarded as economically indefinite as old resources are recycled and new alternatives are assumed to be developed by the market. Simon challenged the notion of an impending Malthusian catastrophe—that an increase in population has negative economic consequences; that population is a drain on natural resources; and that we stand at risk of running out of resources through over-consumption. Simon argues that population is the solution to resource scarcities and environmental problems, since people and markets innovate. His ideas were praised by Nobel Laureate economists Friedrich Hayek and Milton Friedman, the latter in a 1998 foreword to The Ultimate Resource II, but they have also attracted critics such as Paul R. Ehrlich, Albert Allen Bartlett and Herman Daly.

Simon examined different raw materials, especially metals and their prices in historical times. He assumed that besides temporary shortfalls, in the long run prices for raw materials remain at similar levels or even decrease. E.g. aluminium was never as expensive as before 1886 and steel used for medieval armor carried a much higher price tag in current dollars than any modern parallel. A recent discussion of commodity index long-term trends supported his positions.

His 1984 book The Resourceful Earth (co-edited by Herman Kahn), is a similar criticism of the conventional wisdom on population growth and resource consumption and a direct response to the Global 2000 report. For example, it predicted that "There is no compelling reason to believe that world oil prices will rise in the coming decades. In fact, prices may well fall below current levels". Indeed, oil prices trended downward for nearly the next 2 decades, before rising above 1984 levels in about 2003 or 2004. Oil prices have subsequently risen and fallen, and risen again. In 2008, the price of crude oil reached $100 per barrel, a level last attained in the 1860s (inflation adjusted). Later in 2008, the price again sharply fell, to a low of about $40, before rising again to a high around $125. Since mid-2011, prices were slowly trending downward until the middle of 2014, but falling dramatically until the end of 2015 to ca. $30. Since then prices were relatively stable (below $50).

Simon was skeptical, in 1994, of claims that human activity caused global environmental damage, notably in relation to CFCs, ozone depletion and climate change.

Simon also claimed that numerous environmental damage and health dangers from pollution were "definitely disproved". These included lead pollution & IQ, DDT, PCBs, malathion, Agent Orange, asbestos, and the chemical contamination at Love Canal. He dismissed such concerns as a mere "value judgement."

But also, to a startling degree, the decision about whether the overall effect of a child or migrant is positive or negative depends on the values of whoever is making the judgment – your preference to spend a dollar now rather than to wait for a dollar-plus-something in twenty or thirty years, your preferences for having more or fewer wild animals alive as opposed to more or fewer human beings alive, and so on.

=== Influence ===
Simon was one of the founders of free-market environmentalism. An article entitled "The Doomslayer" profiling Julian Simon in Wired magazine inspired Danish Bjørn Lomborg to write the book The Skeptical Environmentalist.

Simon was also the first to suggest that airlines should provide incentives for travelers to give up their seats on overbooked flights, rather than arbitrarily taking random passengers off the plane (a practice known as "bumping"). Although the airline industry initially rejected it, his plan was later implemented with resounding success, as recounted by Milton Friedman in the foreword to The Ultimate Resource II. Economist James Heins said in 2009 that the practice had added $100 billion to the United States economy in the last 30 years. Simon gave away his idea to federal de-regulators and never received any personal profit from his solution.

Although not all of Simon's arguments were universally accepted, they contributed to a shift in opinion in the literature on demographic economics from a strongly Malthusian negative view of population growth to a more neutral view. More recent theoretical developments, based on the ideas of the demographic dividend and demographic window, have contributed to another shift, this time away from the debate viewing population growth as either good or bad.

Simon wrote a memoir, A Life Against the Grain, which was published by his wife after his death.

== Criticism ==
Jared Diamond in his book Collapse, Albert Bartlett and Garrett Hardin describe Simon as being too optimistic and some of his assumptions being not in line with natural limitations.

We now have in our hands—really, in our libraries—the technology to feed, clothe, and supply energy to an ever-growing population for the next seven billion years. (The State of Humanity: Steadily Improving 1995)

Diamond claims that a continued stable growth rate of earth's population would result in extreme over-population long before the suggested time limit. Regarding the attributed population predictions Simon did not specify that he was assuming a fixed growth rate as Diamond, Bartlett and Hardin have done. Simon argued that people do not become poorer as the population expands; increasing numbers produce what they needed to support themselves, and have and will prosper while food prices sink.

There is no reason to believe that at any given moment in the future the available quantity of any natural resource or service at present prices will be much smaller than it is now, or non-existent.

— Simon in The Ultimate Resource, 1981

Diamond believes that Simon implied it would be possible to produce metals, e.g. copper, from other elements. For Simon, human resource needs are comparably small compared to the wealth of nature. He therefore argued physical limitations play a minor role and shortages of raw materials tend to be local and temporary; for him, human brain power is "The Ultimate Resource" constraint. For example, before copper ore became scarce and prices soared due to global increasing demand for copper wires and cablings, data and telecommunication networks switched to glass fiber backbone networks.

This is my long-run forecast in brief, ... The material conditions of life will continue to get better for most people, in most countries, most of the time, indefinitely. Within a century or two, all nations and most of humanity will be at or above today's Western living standards. I also speculate, however, that many people will continue to think and say that the conditions of life are getting worse.

This and other quotations in Wired are supposed to have motivated Bjørn Lomborg to write The Skeptical Environmentalist. Lomborg has stated that he began his research to counter what he saw as Simons' anti-ecological arguments but changed his mind after starting to analyze the data.

Georgist economist Herman Daly criticized Simon as making profound mistakes and exaggerations, for denial of resource finitude and for his views that neither ecology nor entropy exist.

== Legacy ==
The Institute for the Study of Labor established the annual Julian L. Simon Lecture to honor Simon's work in population economics. The University of Illinois at Urbana-Champaign held a symposium discussing Simon's work on April 24, 2002. The university also established the Julian Simon Memorial Faculty Scholar Endowment to fund an associate faculty member in the business school. India's Liberty Institute also holds a Julian Simon Memorial Lecture. The Competitive Enterprise Institute gives the Julian Simon Memorial Award annually to an economist in the vein of Simon; the first recipient was Stephen Moore, who had served as a research fellow under Simon in the 1980s.

== Personal life ==
Simon was remembered as a traditionalist Jew who did not work on the Sabbath. He emphasized empirical data in arguments and had a combative personality which enjoyed rhetorical exchanges. His wife, Rita James, was a former socialist activist; they met while students at the University of Chicago and married during that period. She was a longtime member of the faculty at the University of Illinois at Urbana-Champaign and later became a public affairs professor at American University. They had three children: David, Judith, and Daniel.

For a long time, Simon experienced debilitating depression, which allowed him to work only a few productive hours in a day. He also studied the psychology of depression and wrote a book on overcoming it. He died on February 8, 1998. The cause was a heart attack at his home in Chevy Chase in 1998; he died at age 65.

== Honors ==
- Doctor honoris causa, University of Navarra, (Spain), Economics, 1998

== Works ==
- Simon, Julian (1965). How to Start and Operate a Mail Order Business, (1st ed.). New York: McGraw Hill. ISBN 978-0070573994.
- Simon, Julian (August 1981). The Ultimate Resource (Hardcover ed.). Princeton: Princeton University Press. ISBN 069109389X.
- Simon, Julian L (1996). The Ultimate Resource 2 (Paperback ed.). Princeton: Princeton University Press. ISBN 0691042691.
- The Resourceful Earth: A Response to "Global 2000" (1984), ISBN 0631134670, Julian Simon & Herman Kahn, eds
- The Economic Consequences of Immigration into the United States
- Effort, Opportunity, and Wealth: Some Economics of the Human Spirit
- Good Mood: The New Psychology of Overcoming Depression ISBN 0812690982 (Forewords by Albert Ellis and Kenneth Colby)
- The Hoodwinking of a Nation ISBN 1560004347 (hard), ISBN 1412805937 (soft)
- A Life Against the Grain: The Autobiography of an Unconventional Economist ISBN 0765805324
- Scarcity or Abundance? A Debate on the Environment (1994), (with Norman Myers), ISBN 0393035905
- The Philosophy and Practice of Resampling Statistics
- Basic research methods in social sciences: The art of empirical investigation, ISBN 039432049-2
- Resampling: A Better Way to Teach (and Do) Statistics (with Peter C. Bruce)
- The Science and Art of Thinking Well in Science, Business, the Arts, and Love
- Economics of Population: Key Modern Writings, ISBN 1852787651
- The State of Humanity, ISBN 155786585X
- It's Getting Better All the Time : 100 Greatest Trends of the Last 100 Years by Stephen Moore, Julian Lincoln Simon ISBN 1882577973 manuscript finished posthumously by Stephen Moore
