= The Ultimate Resource =

1981 book by Julian Lincoln Simon

- First edition
- Author: Julian Simon
- Language: English
- Subject: Natural resources
- Publisher: Princeton University Press
- Publication date: 1981, 1996
- Publication place: United States
- Media type: Print (hardcover & paperback)
- Pages: 734 (1996 edition)
- ISBN: 0-691-00381-5 (Revised 1996 edition, paperback)
- OCLC: 39842255

The Ultimate Resource is a 1981 book written by Julian Lincoln Simon challenging the notion that humanity was running out of natural resources. It was updated in 1996 as The Ultimate Resource 2.

== Overview ==
The overarching thesis on why there is no resource crisis is that as a particular resource becomes more scarce, its price rises. This price rise creates an incentive for people to discover more of the resource, ration and recycle it, and eventually, develop substitutes. The "ultimate resource" is not any particular physical object but the capacity for humans to invent and adapt.

=== Scarcity ===
The work opens with an explanation of scarcity, noting its relation to price; high prices denote relative scarcity and low prices indicate abundance. Simon usually measures prices in wage-adjusted terms, since this is a measure of how much labor is required to purchase a fixed amount of a particular resource. Since prices for most raw materials (e.g., copper) have fallen between 1800 and 1990 (adjusting for wages and adjusting for inflation), Simon argues that this indicates that those materials have become less scarce.

Simon contends that resources, such as copper, become less scarce as demand for them drives recycling, development of alternatives, and new extraction techniques, which are all reflected in the drop in their wage-adjusted prices.

=== Forecasting ===
Simon makes a distinction between "engineering” and "economic" forecasting. Engineering forecasting consists of estimating the amount of known physical amount of resources, extrapolates the rate of use from current use and subtracts one from the other. Simon argues that these simple analyses are often wrong. While focusing only on proven resources is helpful in a business context, it is not appropriate for economy-wide forecasting. There exist undiscovered sources, sources not yet economically feasible to extract, sources not yet technologically feasible to extract, and ignored resources that could prove useful but are not yet worth trying to discover.

To counter the problems of engineering forecasting, Simon proposes economic forecasting, which proceeds in three steps in order to capture, in part, the unknowns the engineering method leaves out (p 27):

# Ask whether there is any convincing reason to think that the period for which you are forecasting will be different from the past, going back as far as the data will allow

1. If there is no good reason to reject the past trend as representative of the future as well, ask whether there is a reasonable explanation for the observed trend
2. If there is no reason to believe that the future will be different from the past, and if you have solid explanation for the trend—or even if you lack a solid theory, but the data are overwhelming—project the trend into the future

=== Infinite resources ===
Perhaps the most controversial claim in the book is that natural resources are infinite. Simon argues not that there is an infinite physical amount of, say, copper, but for human purposes that amount should be treated as infinite because it is not bounded or limited in any economic sense, because:

- known reserves are of uncertain quantity
- new reserves may become available, either through discovery or via the development of new extraction techniques
- recycling
- more efficient utilization of existing reserves (e.g., "It takes much less copper now to pass a given message than a hundred years ago." [The Ultimate Resource 2, 1996, footnote, page 62])
- development of economic equivalents, e.g., optic fibre in the case of copper for telecommunications

The ever-decreasing prices, in wage-adjusted terms, indicate decreasing scarcity, in that it takes less time for the average worker to earn the money required to purchase a set amount of some commodity. This suggests, Simon claims, an enduring trend of increased availability that will not cease in the foreseeable future, despite continued population growth.

== Evidence ==
A plurality of the book consists of chapters showcasing the economics of one resource or another and proposing why this resource is, for human purposes, infinite.

=== Historical precedent ===
Simon argues that for thousands of years, people have always worried about the end of civilization brought on by a crisis of resources. Simon lists several past unfounded environmental fears in order to back his claim that modern fears are nothing new and will also be disproven.

Some of the "crises" he notes are a shortage of tin in the 13th century BCE; disappearing forests in Greece in 550 BCE and in England in the 16th century to 18th century CE; food in 1798; coal in Great Britain in the 19th century; oil since the 1850s; and various metals since the 1970s.

== Simon–Ehrlich wager ==
Based on preliminary research for The Ultimate Resource, Simon and Paul Ehrlich made a famous wager in 1980, betting on a mutually agreed upon measure of resource scarcity over the decade leading up to 1990.

Ehrlich was the author of a popular book, The Population Bomb, which argued that mankind was facing a demographic catastrophe with the rate of population growth quickly outstripping growth in the supply of food and resources. Simon was highly skeptical of such claims.

Simon had Ehrlich choose five of several commodity metals. Ehrlich chose five metals: copper, chromium, nickel, tin, and tungsten. Simon bet that their prices would go down. Ehrlich bet they would go up.

The basket of goods, costing US$1,000 in 1980, fell in price by over 57 percent over the following decade. As a result, in October 1990, Paul Ehrlich mailed Julian Simon a check for US$576.07 to settle the wager in Simon's favor.

== Population ==
A large section of the book is dedicated to showing how population growth ultimately creates more resources. The basic argument echoes the overarching thesis: as resources become more scarce, the price rises, creating an incentive to adapt. It suggests that the more a society has to invent and innovate, all else being equal, the more easily the society will raise its living standards and lower resource scarcity.

== See also ==
- Julian Lincoln Simon
- Thomas Malthus
- Paul R. Ehrlich
- Post scarcity
