= Rosling =

Rosling is a surname. Notable people with the surname include:

- George Rosling (1900–1973), American judge
- Hans Rosling (1948–2017), Swedish physician, academic, statistician, and public speaker
- Ola Rosling (born 1975), Swedish statistician

== See also ==
- Roslin (disambiguation)
