= University of Skövde =

Public University in Sweden

Coordinates: 58.39453°N 13.85412°E

- Högskolan i Skövde
- Logotype of The University of Skövde
- Type: Public university
- Established: 1977; 49 years ago
- Affiliations: SUHF
- Budget: SEK 605 million
- Vice-Chancellor: Muriel Beser Hugosson
- Faculty: 294 (2025)
- Administrative staff: 143
- Students: 12 000 (4 779 FTE), 2025
- Doctoral students: 44
- Location: Skövde, Sweden
- Campus: Urban
- Colours: Ruby. Sapphire
- Website: www.his.se

The University of Skövde (in Swedish: Högskolan i Skövde, HS) is a Swedish state university in Skövde municipality, Sweden. The higher education institution was founded in 1977 and was granted official university status in 1983.

The University of Skövde conducts education and research in areas including behavioural science, bioscience, computer games, computer science and IT, business, engineering science, and health and care. The University offers education at first-cycle, second-cycle and third-cycle levels.

The University of Skövde has approximately 12,000 registered students (4,700 FTE) and 400 employees (2025). Its activities are located on a single campus in central Skövde. The student union affiliated with the University is the Student Union in Skövde.

== Education ==
The University of Skövde offers study programmes and freestanding courses in several subject areas. Education is offered at first-cycle and second-cycle levels, as well as in two third-cycle subject areas.

The University’s educational provision includes programmes in areas such as behavioural science, bioscience, game development, computer science and IT, business, engineering science, and health and care. The University also offers qualifying education.

Game development is one of the University of Skövde’s more distinctive educational areas. The first courses in computer games began in 2002. Since then, the area has developed and now comprises education with specialisations in areas including graphics, design, programming and game experience.

=== Doctoral Studies ===
The University of Skövde is entitled to offer doctoral studies in two areas: health sciences and informatics.

Doctoral studies in health sciences may include a focus on health in the digital society and issues relating to how digitalisation affects people’s health and wellbeing.

Doctoral studies in informatics includes areas such as artificial intelligence, information systems, cognitive science, distributed real-time systems, human-computer interaction, game development, software systems, and automated and virtual production engineering.

== Research ==
Research at the University of Skövde is organised into five Research Environments: Digital Health Research (DHEAR), Informatics, Systems Biology, Virtual Engineering and Organising for Sustainable Development. The University of Skövde was ranked seventh when the Swedish Foundation for Strategic Research, in 2024, compiled the Strategic Research Index for 23 Swedish higher education institutions.

=== Digital Health Research (DHEAR) ===
The Research Environment Digital Health Research (DHEAR) conducts research on the opportunities and consequences of digitalisation from a health perspective. The environment includes researchers from fields including biomedicine, public health science, nursing, social psychology and languages.

=== Informatics ===
The Research Environment Informatics conducts research in areas such as artificial intelligence, cognitive and interactive systems, distributed real-time systems, information systems, software systems, and media, technology and culture.

=== Organising for Sustainable Development ===
The Research Environment Organising for Sustainable Development conducts research on how organisations can manage internal and external challenges and develop towards social, economic and ecological sustainability.

=== Systems Biology ===
The Research Environment Systems Biology develops methods in bioinformatics, mathematical modelling and data analysis to study biological systems. The research also covers molecular biology, precision medicine and theoretical ecology.

=== Virtual Engineering ===
The Research Environment Virtual Engineering conducts research on the development and use of computer-based virtual models and methods, as well as digital twins. The research findings are applied in areas including the manufacturing industry, power and energy systems, and health and medical care. The Research Environment is part of the industrial graduate school Smart Industry Sweden.

== Collaboration with the business and public sectors ==
=== ASSAR Industrial Innovation Arena ===
The University of Skövde is one of the partners behind ASSAR Industrial Innovation Arena, a collaborative environment focused on the manufacturing industry and industrial development. The other partners include Science Park Skövde, IDC West Sweden, Volvo Cars and the Volvo Group.

=== The computer games sector and Sweden Game Arena ===
The University of Skövde’s programmes in computer game development have played an important role in the emergence of Skövde as an environment for games education and game development. The university is part of Sweden Game Arena, a collaborative platform for stakeholders in the games sector.

=== PICS ===
PICS, Privacy, Information Security and Cybersecurity, is a platform for the University of Skövde’s collaboration in education and research relating to privacy, information security and cybersecurity.

=== Science Park Skövde ===
The University of Skövde works closely with Science Park Skövde, a technology and business park adjacent to the university’s campus. Science Park Skövde’s activities include start-up support and business development.

=== Skaraborg Health Technology Centre ===
The University of Skövde is home to Skaraborg Health Technology Centre, a knowledge centre and testbed focused on innovation, research and education in healthcare, health and welfare. In this environment, visitors can, among other things, experience the physical and sensory changes associated with advanced age by using an ageing suit.

== Collaboration with other higher education institutions ==
The University of Skövde collaborates with other higher education institutions in both education and research.

=== Teacher education ===
The University of Borås offers teacher education in Skövde, on the University of Skövde’s campus.

=== Ingenium ===
The University of Skövde is a member of the INGENIUM European University, a collaboration between ten European higher education institutions.

=== Campus Total Defence ===
The University of Skövde is a member of the Campus Total Defence collaboration arena.

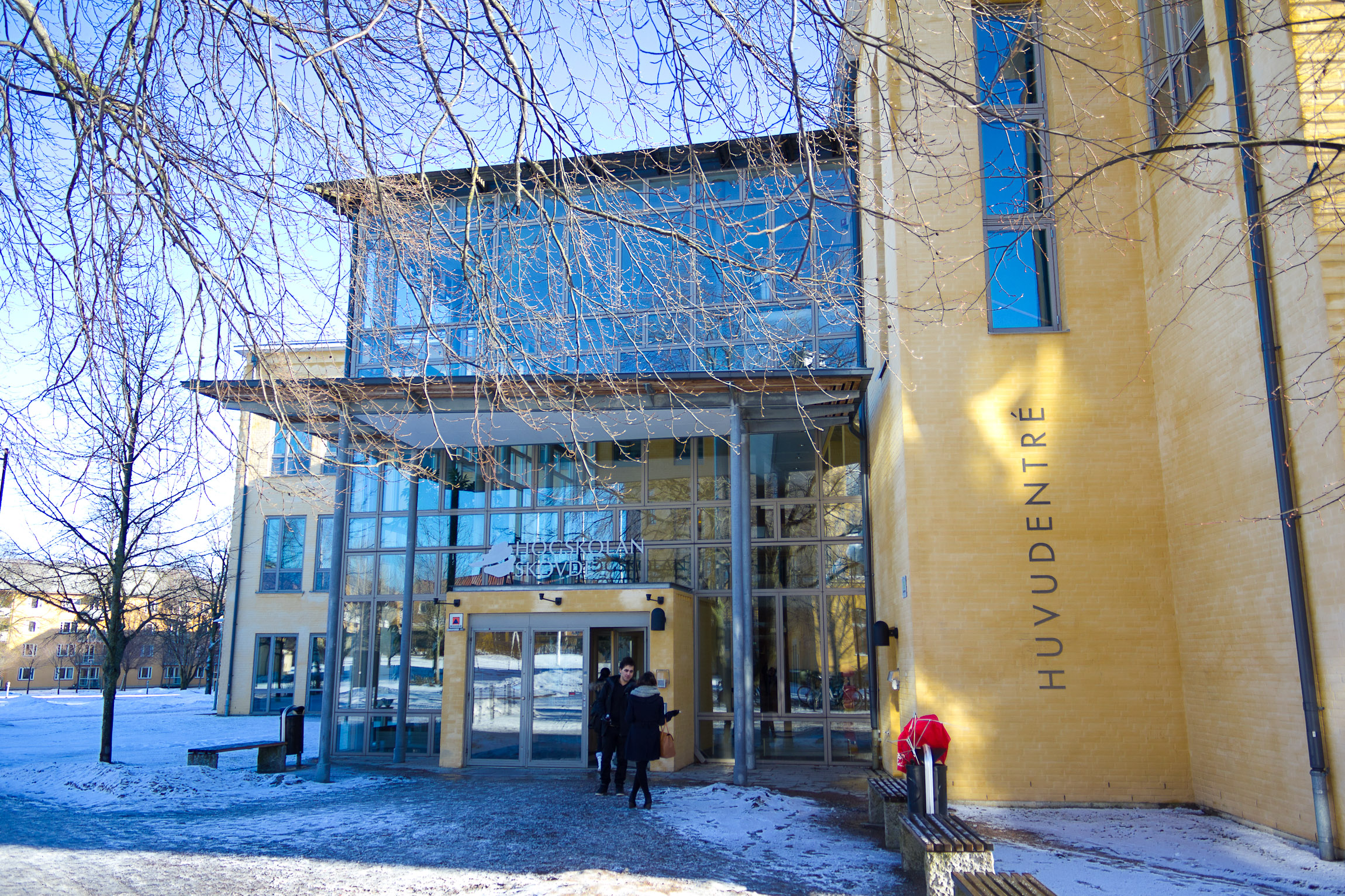
Main entrance.

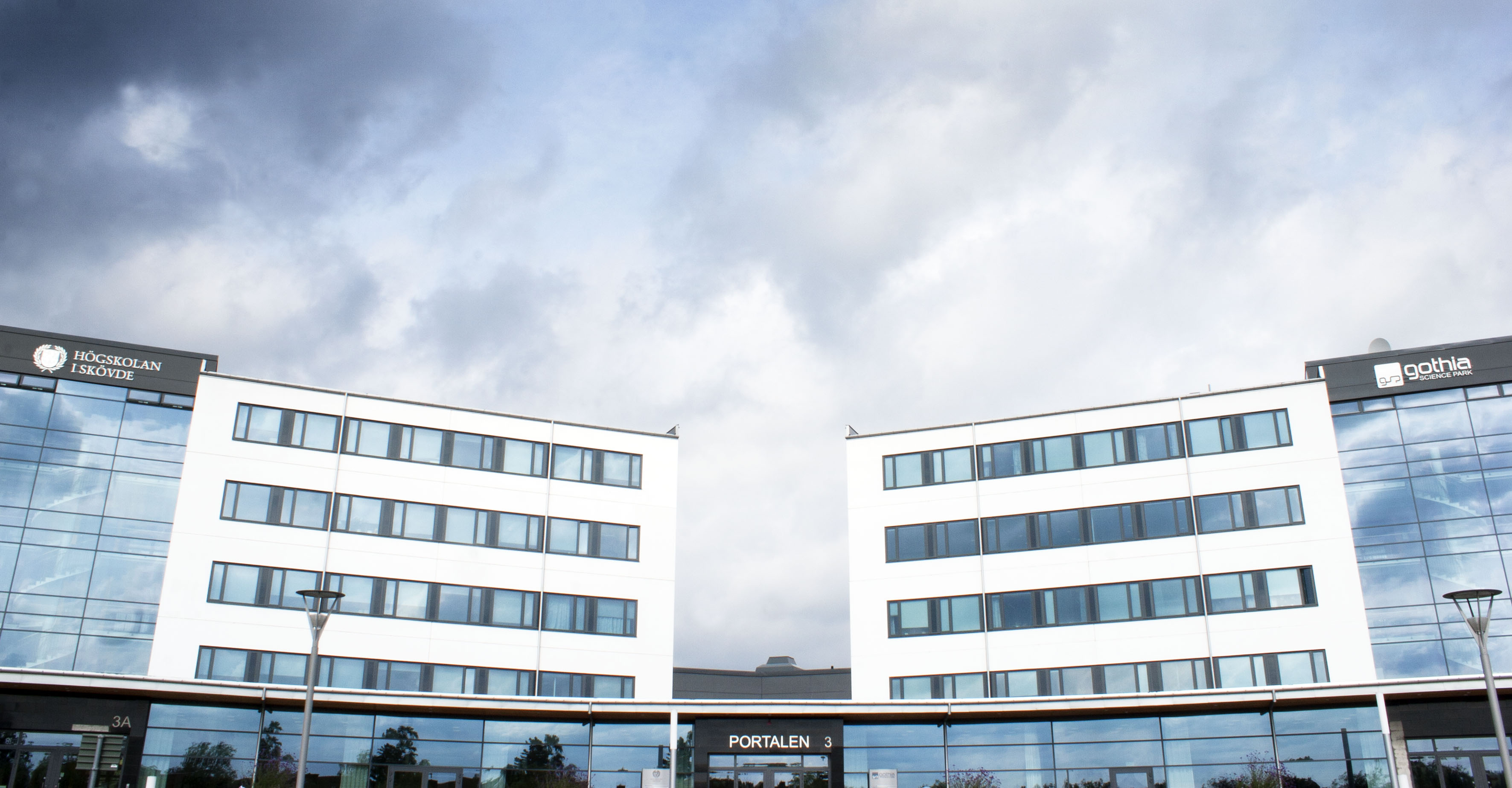
The Portalen building housing the school of informatics,

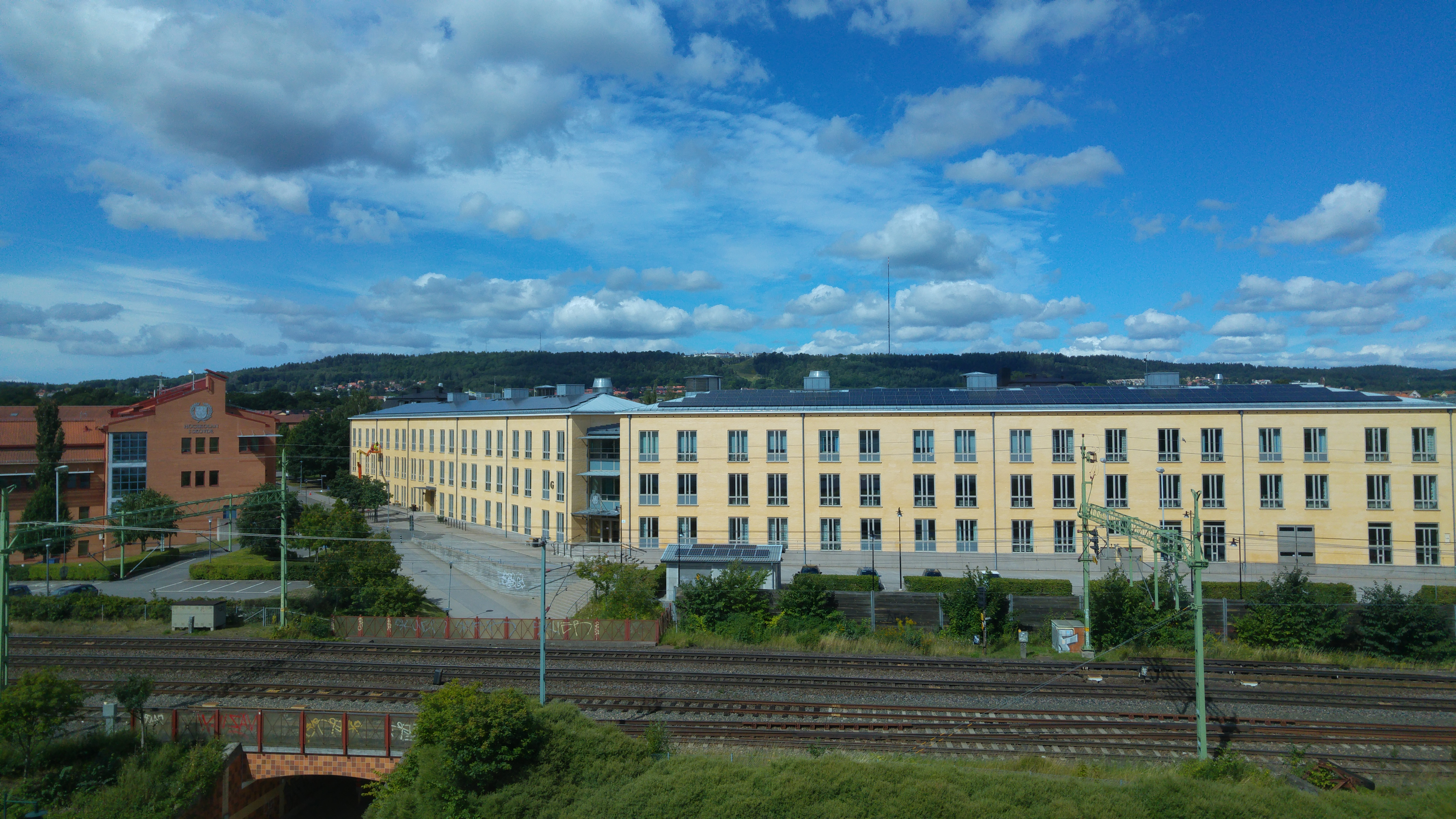
Buildings E (left) and G (right) at the University of Skövde campus.

== Organisation ==
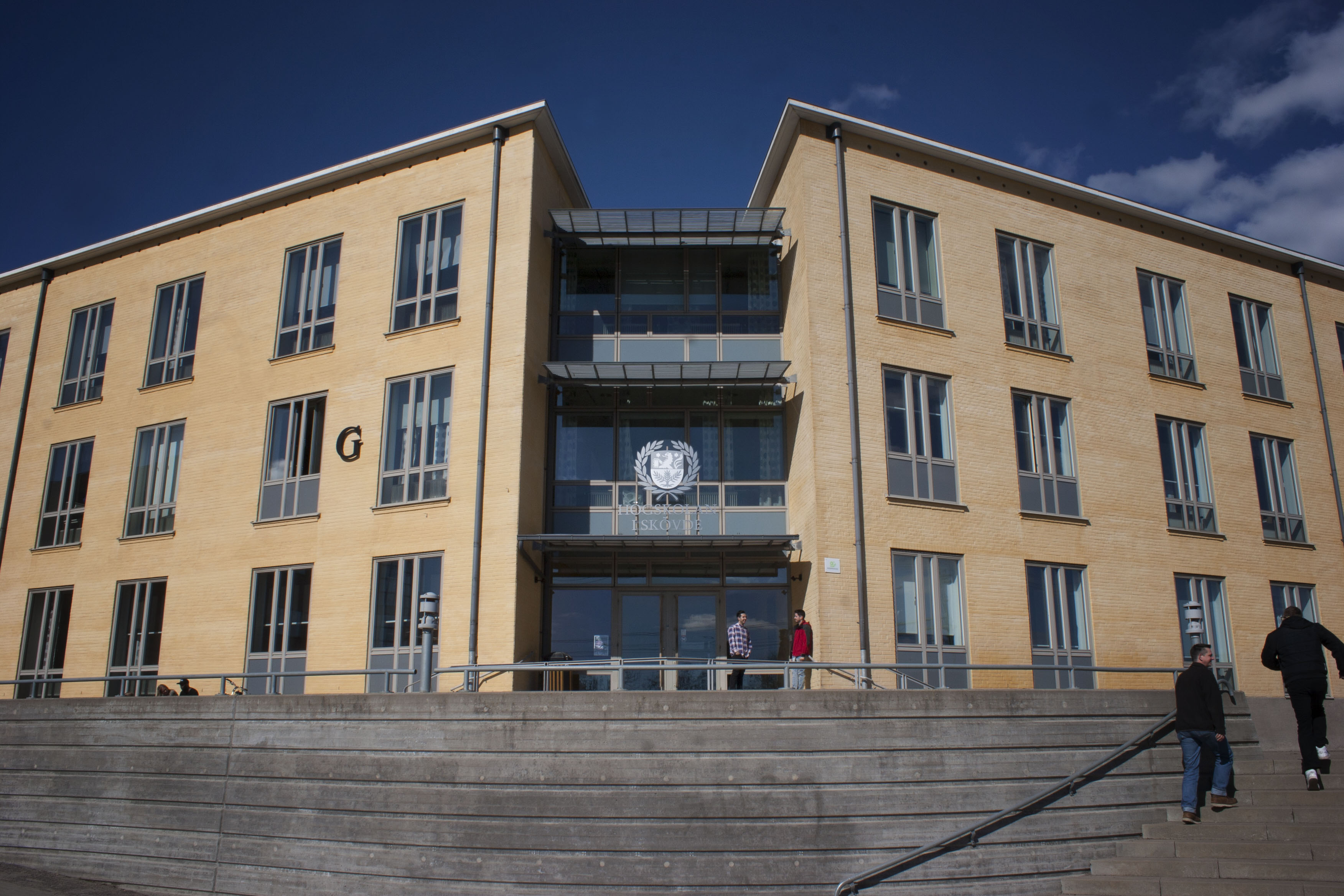
The University of Skövde, Building G

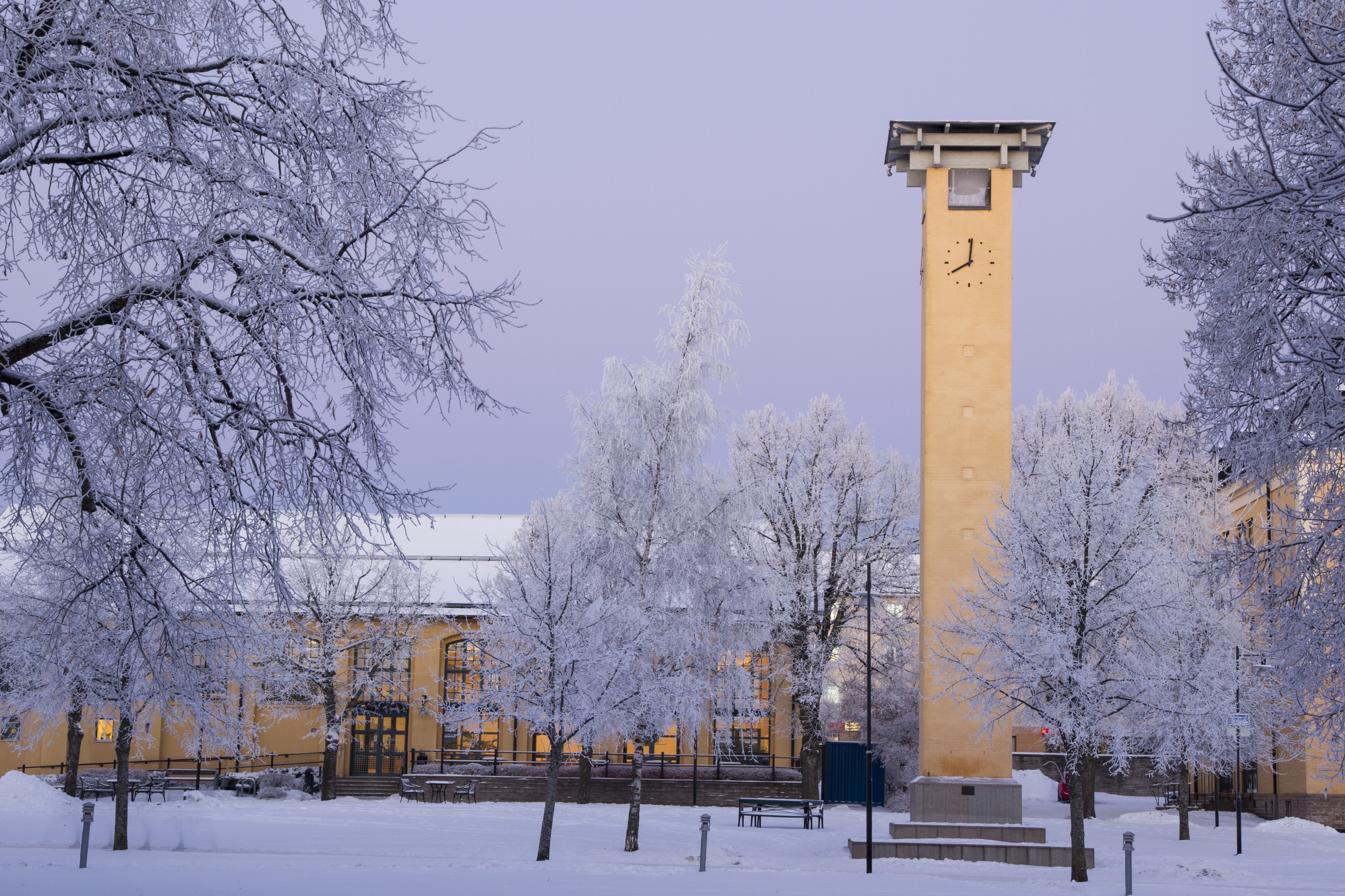
Snow-covered campus at the University of Skövde

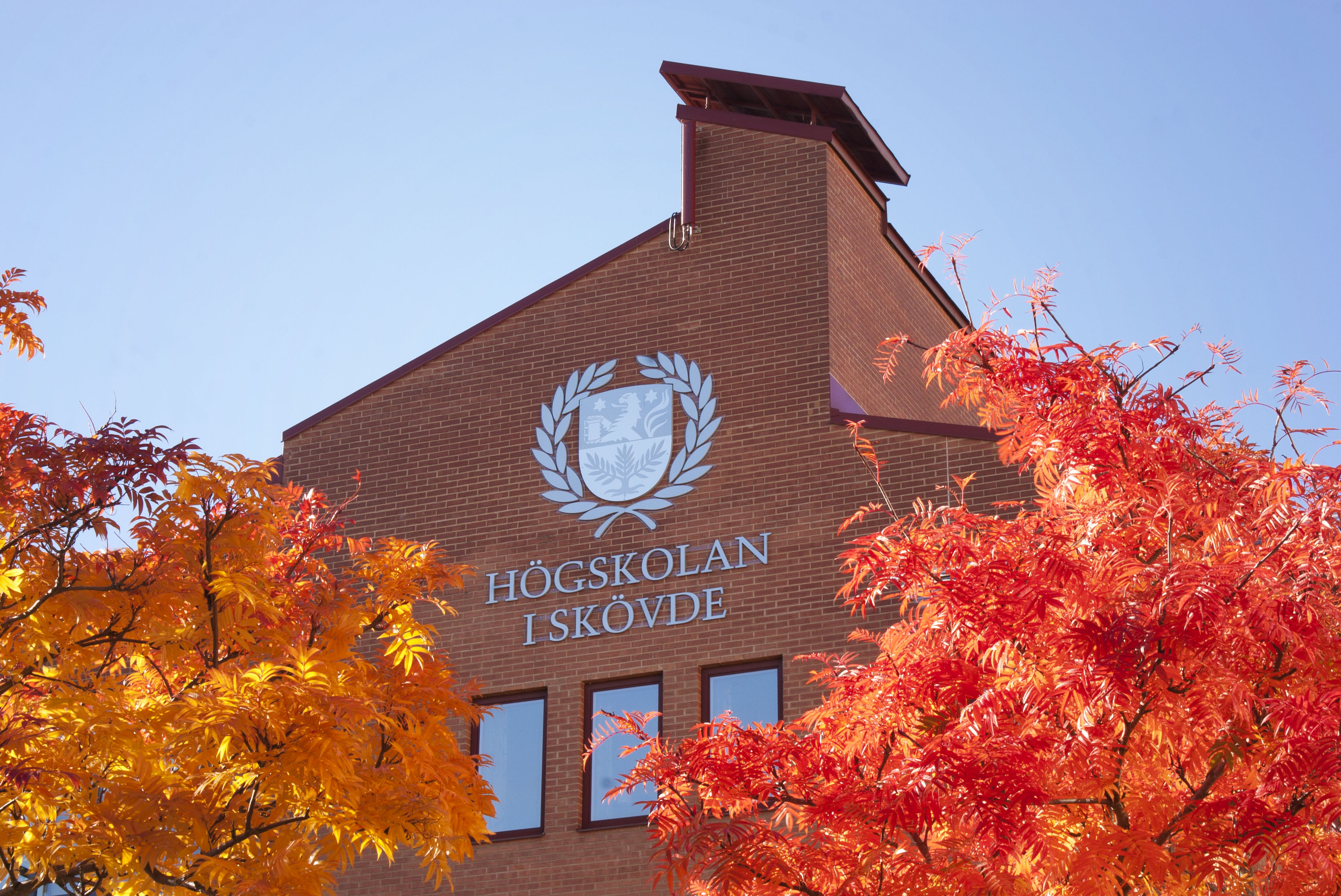
The University of Skövde, Building E.

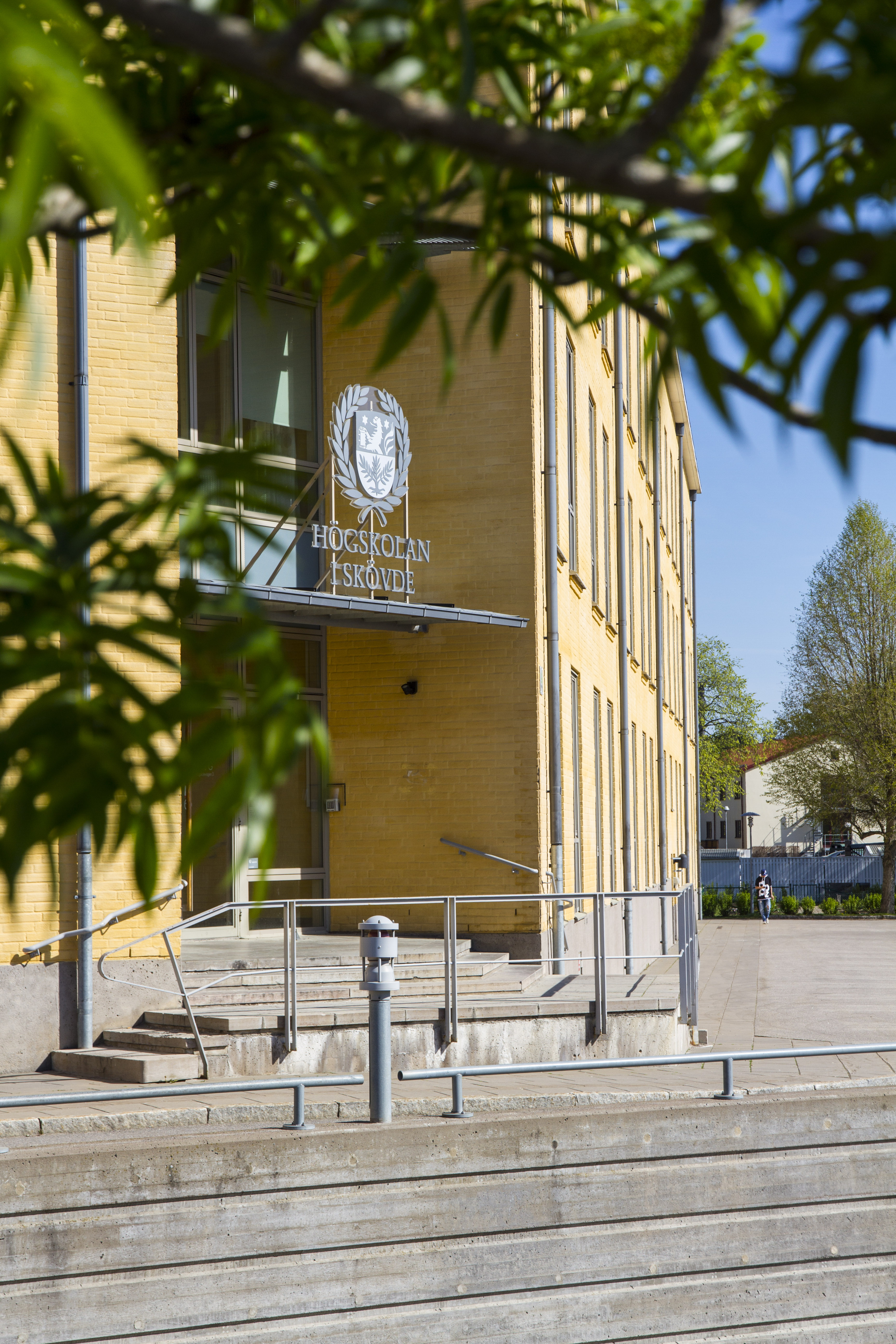
G Building at University of Skövde

A rendition of the coat of arms of the University of Skövde

The University of Skövde’s education and research are conducted at five schools:

- The School of Bioscience
- The School of Business
- The School of Health Sciences
- The School of Engineering Science
- The School of Informatics

== History ==
The University of Skövde was founded following a decision by the Swedish Parliament in 1977. In its first years, the institution had approximately 300 full-year student places. On 1 July 1983, it was officially granted university status.

In the early 1980s, its previous focus on business and economics was broadened to include programmes in engineering and computer science. In 1986, a significant part of the activities was moved to premises that had previously belonged to the Göta Logistic Corps.

During the 1990s, the University of Skövde continued to grow. New buildings were constructed, including Building E, a new library building and Building D. In 1999, the School of Health Sciences West in Skövde was integrated into the University of Skövde. In the same year, Building G was completed; it remains one of the University’s larger buildings. In connection with the construction, the Campanile, a bell tower on campus, was also built.

== Student life and student influence ==
The Student Union in Skövde has the status of official student union at the University of Skövde. The Union represents students in matters relating to education, the student social environment and student influence.

The city of Skövde has twice been named Student City of the Year by the Swedish National Union of Students, in 2008 and 2025.

== Controversies ==
In November 2020, the School of Informatics terminated two tenured Senior Lecturer positions to address its budget deficit. Separately, 21 layoffs across the University of Skövde became effective in January 2025.

== Vice-Chancellors ==
The following people have served as Vice-Chancellors of the University of Skövde since the higher education institution was founded:

1983–2001 Lars-Erik Johansson
2001–2010 Leif Larsson
2010–2016 Sigbritt Karlsson
2017–2022 Lars Niklasson
2023– Muriel Beser Hugosson

== Honorary doctors ==
The following people have been awarded honorary doctorates by the University of Skövde:

- Noel Sharkey, 2014
- Åsa Roos, 2016
- Ola Rosling and Anna Rosling, 2018
- Luciano Floridi, 2021
- Deborah Lupton, 2023
- Simone Giertz, 2025

== Notable alumni ==
- Erik Ekstrand (TV personality)
- Mackan Edlund (TV personality)
- Martin Hansson (artist)
- Niklas Åkerblad (artist)
- Alain Darborg (film director)
- Lars Elinderson (politician)
- Anna-Klara Mehlich (author)
- Darko Šarović (Track & Field athlete)
- Coffee Stain Studios (video game studio)

== See also ==
- List of universities in Sweden
