= Don't Panic — The Truth about Population =

2013 television documentary

Don't Panic — The Truth about Population is a 2013 documentary about human overpopulation produced by Wingspan Productions and The Open University for the BBC as part of the This World series and presented by Swedish statistician Hans Rosling of the Gapminder Foundation. The documentary combines a lecture by Rosling, showing Musion 3D infographics in front of him, with film sequences featuring exemplary stories in different regions in the world. One film section is about a family planning worker in Bangladesh, where the life expectancy increased from less than 50 years in 1972 to over 70, while the number of children per woman declined from more than seven to less than 2.5 in average, and is still falling. Rosling states that this number is representative worldwide and is the reason why the total number of children globally is now at a stable level of 2 billion. According to him, the so-called population explosion has already been overcome. The human population will peak at 11 billion, and stabilize at this level by the end of the century.

== Reception ==
Reviews described the documentary as "surprisingly upbeat" and as a "wise and thoroughly informative programme, filled with surprising statistics, but mainly, it was an optimistic one".
