= Anna Rosling Rönnlund =

Swedish designer

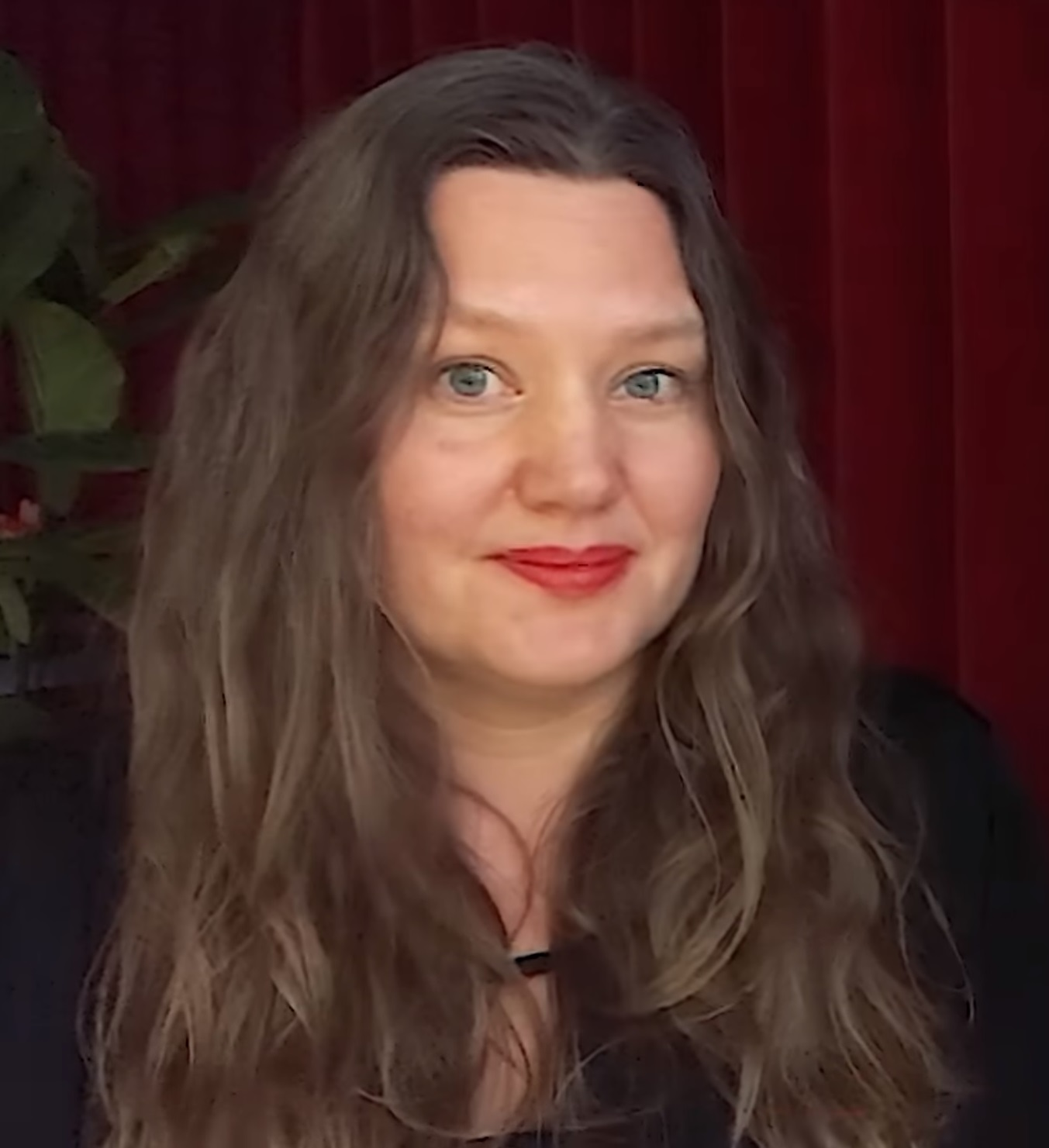
Rosling Rönnlund discusses the book Factfulness in 2018

Anna Rosling Rönnlund (born April 4, 1975) is a Swedish designer who is a co-founder of the Gapminder Foundation. She also, with her husband Ola Rosling, developed Trendalyzer, interactive software for visualizing statistical information. After Trendalyzer was sold to Google in 2007, the couple continued work on its development until August 2010. Rönnlund was awarded an honorary doctorate at the University of Skövde.

== Life ==
In 2005, together with statistician and father-in-law Hans Rosling, she co-founded the Gapminder Foundation, where she serves as vice president for design and usability. With her husband Ola Rosling, Rönnlund developed Trendalyzer, interactive software for visualizing statistical information. After Trendalyzer was sold to Google in 2007, the couple continued work on its development until August 2010. In 2016, she announced Dollar Street, a website that imagines a street of homes to help visualize how people of varying cultures and incomes live around the world.

In 2017, Rönnlund spoke at the TED conference where she explained the power of Data visualization.

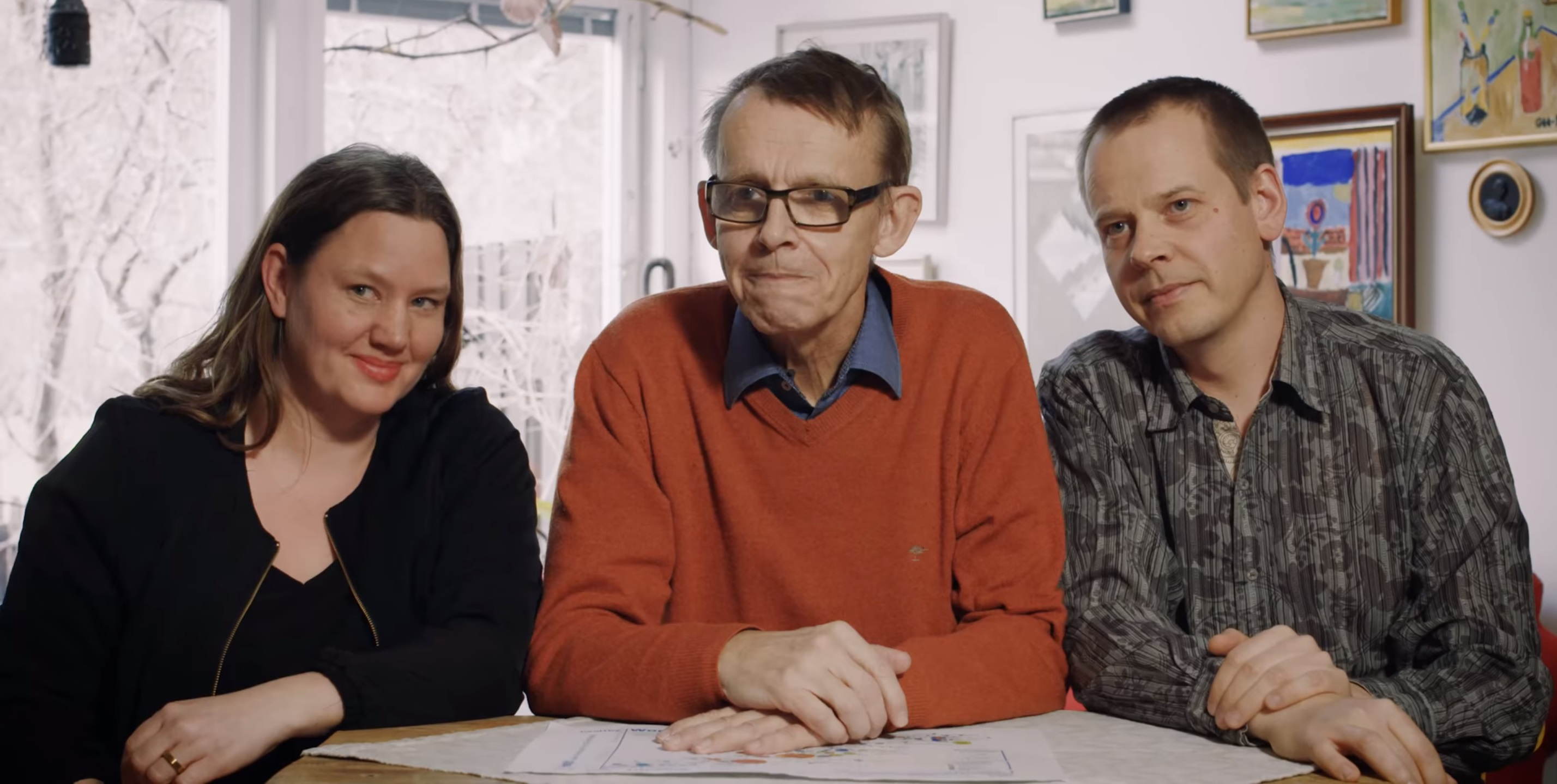
(Left to right) Anna Rosling Rönnlund, Hans Rosling, and Ola Rosling discuss their book "Factfulness" in 2016

In 2017, she collaborated with Hans Rosling for his book titled Factfulness alongside Ola Rosling.

Rönnlund sees many benefits of working on different projects with family. In an interview with W Insight portal, she talks about flexibility, convenience and being more open working with her husband. She also admits her children "came up on stage a few times."

On the fifth of November 2018, Anna and Ola Rosling were promoted to honorary doctorates at the University of Skövde in connection with the school's academic celebrations.

== Publication ==
- Hans Rosling; Ola Rosling; Anna Rosling Rönnlund (2018). Factfulness: Ten Reasons We're Wrong About the World – and Why Things Are Better Than You Think. Flatiron Books. p. 288. ISBN 9781250123817.
