= Bioscience, Biotechnology, and Biochemistry =

- Discipline: Bioscience, Biotechnology
- Language: English

Publication details
- Former name(s): Bulletin of the Agricultural Chemical Society of Japan, Agriculture and Biological Chemistry
- History: 1924–present
- Publisher: Japan Society for Bioscience, Biotechnology and Agrochemistry (Japan)
- Frequency: Monthly
- Impact factor: 1.063 (2014)

Standard abbreviations
- ISO 4: Biosci. Biotechnol. Biochem.

Indexing
- CODEN: BBBIEJ
- ISSN: 0916-8451 (print); 1347-6947 (web)
- LCCN: 92659654
- OCLC no.: 25516229

Links
- Journal homepage; Archive (Vol 56–present); Archive (Vol 28–55); Archive (Vol 1–27)

Bioscience, Biotechnology, and Biochemistry is a monthly, peer-reviewed, scientific journal published by the Japan Society for Bioscience, Biotechnology and Agrochemistry, of which it is the official journal. It was established in 1924 as Bulletin of the Agricultural Chemical Society of Japan (日本農芸化学会紀要, Nihon Nougeikagakukai Kiyou), which was renamed to Agriculture and Biological Chemistry in 1961. The journal took its current name in 1991.

== Scope ==
The focus of Bioscience, Biotechnology, and Biochemistry is previously unpublished original research results on all topics and fields concerning bioscience, biotechnology, and biochemistry. In addition, articles cover basic and applied sciences regarding microorganisms, including systems supporting their production, and structure. Broad topical coverage includes organic chemistry, bioorganic chemistry, physical chemistry, analytical chemistry, enzymology, biopolymer science, microbiology (including virology), animal science, plant science, food science, and environmental science.

Research applications are directed toward human welfare in general. Hence applications are transferred to industries of fermentation, chemistry and biochemistry, medicines and pharmaceuticals, foods and feeds, and agriculture.

== Abstracting and indexing ==
Bioscience, Biotechnology, and Biochemistry is indexed in the following databases.

- BIOSIS Previews
- Chemical Abstracts Service
- Current Contents/Agriculture, Biology & Environmental Sciences
- Current Contents/Life Sciences
- Compendex
- Food Science and Technology Abstracts
- GeoRef
- MEDLINE/PubMed
- Science Citation Index

According to the Journal Citation Reports, it has an impact factor of 1.063 for 2014.
