= Sigbritt Karlsson =

Chemical engineer

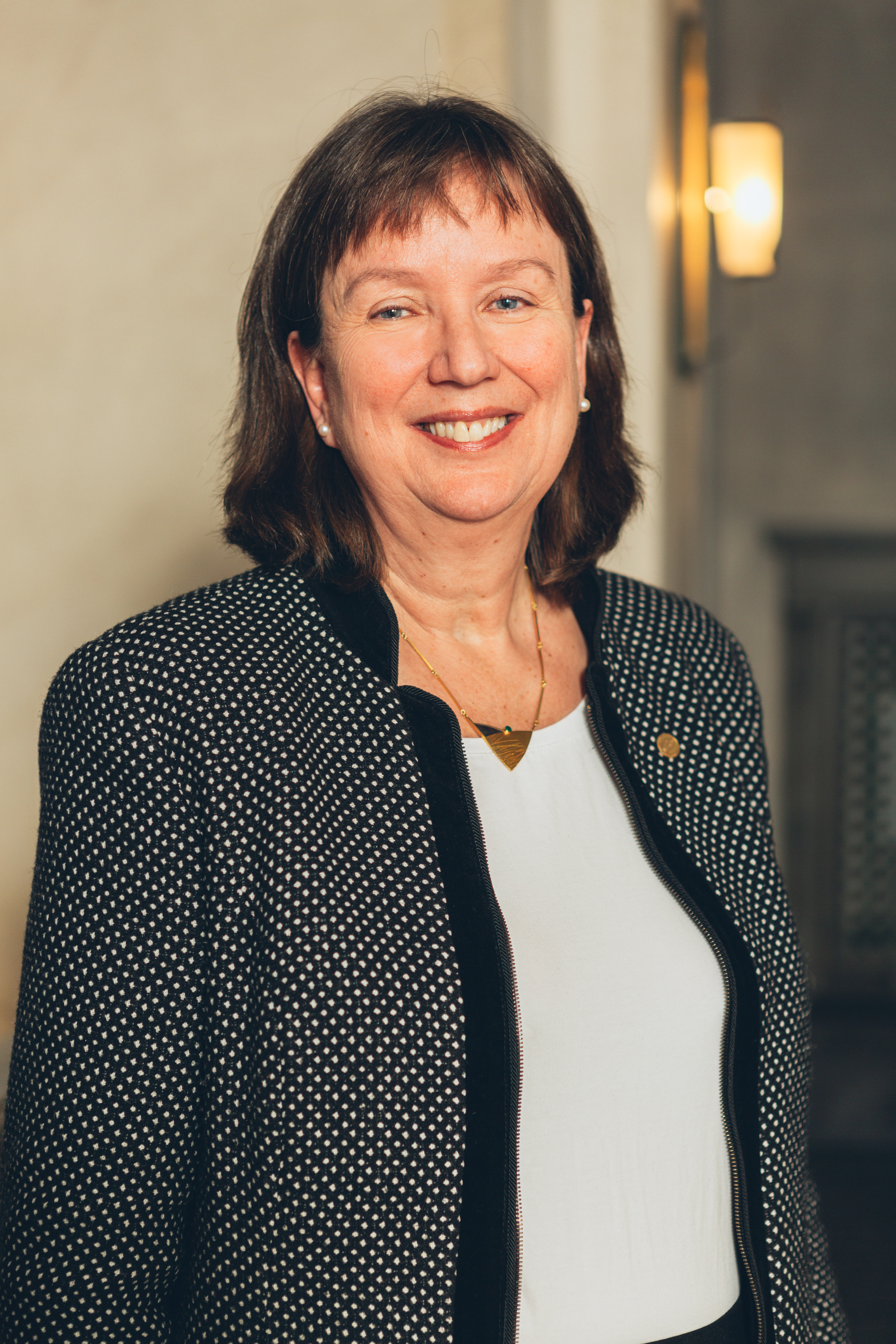

President of KTH Royal Institute of Technology
- In office 2016–2022

Personal details
- Born: January 31, 1958
- Died: October 28, 2023 (aged 65)
- Occupation: Academic

Sigbritt Karlsson (31 January 1958 – 28 October 2023) was a Swedish chemical engineer and president of KTH Royal Institute of Technology between November 2016 and November 2022.

Karlsson earned a master of science in chemical engineering with a specialization in biotechnology from KTH. She subsequently completed a PhD in polymer technology.

From 1996 to 2004 Karlsson worked as Director of Studies at KTH. Between 2008 and 2010 she was Vice Dean with responsibility for strategic education issues.

Karlsson was Vice-Chancellor of the University of Skövde 2010–2016. On November 12, 2016, she became the 19th President of KTH Royal Institute of Technology.
