= Factfulness =

2018 book by Hans Rosling

Factfulness: Ten Reasons We're Wrong About the World – and Why Things Are Better Than You Think
- Author: Hans Rosling, Anna Rosling Rönnlund, Ola Rosling
- Genre: Non-fiction
- Publisher: Flatiron Books (US); Sceptre (UK)
- Publication date: April 3, 2018
- Media type: Print (hardcover)
- Pages: 341
- ISBN: 978-1-250-10781-7
- Website: Gapminder: Factfulness (the book)

Factfulness: Ten Reasons We're Wrong About the World – and Why Things Are Better Than You Think is a 2018 book by Swedish physician, professor of international health at Karolinska Institute and statistician Hans Rosling with his son Ola Rosling and daughter-in-law Anna Rosling Rönnlund. The book was published posthumously a year after Hans Rosling died from pancreatic cancer. In the book, Rosling suggests that the vast majority of people are wrong about the state of the world. He demonstrates that his test subjects believe the world is poorer, less healthy, and more dangerous than it actually is, attributing this not to random chance but to misinformation.

Rosling recommends thinking about the world as divided into four levels based on income brackets (rather than the prototypical developed/developing framework) and suggests ten instincts that prevent us from seeing real progress in the world.

Bill Gates highlighted the book as one of his suggested five books worth reading for summer 2018, offering to purchase a copy for any 2018 college graduate upon request. The book Factfulness has not only been praised, but criticized for presenting a too positive picture of global conditions, especially environmental matters and inequalities in human societies.

== Summary ==
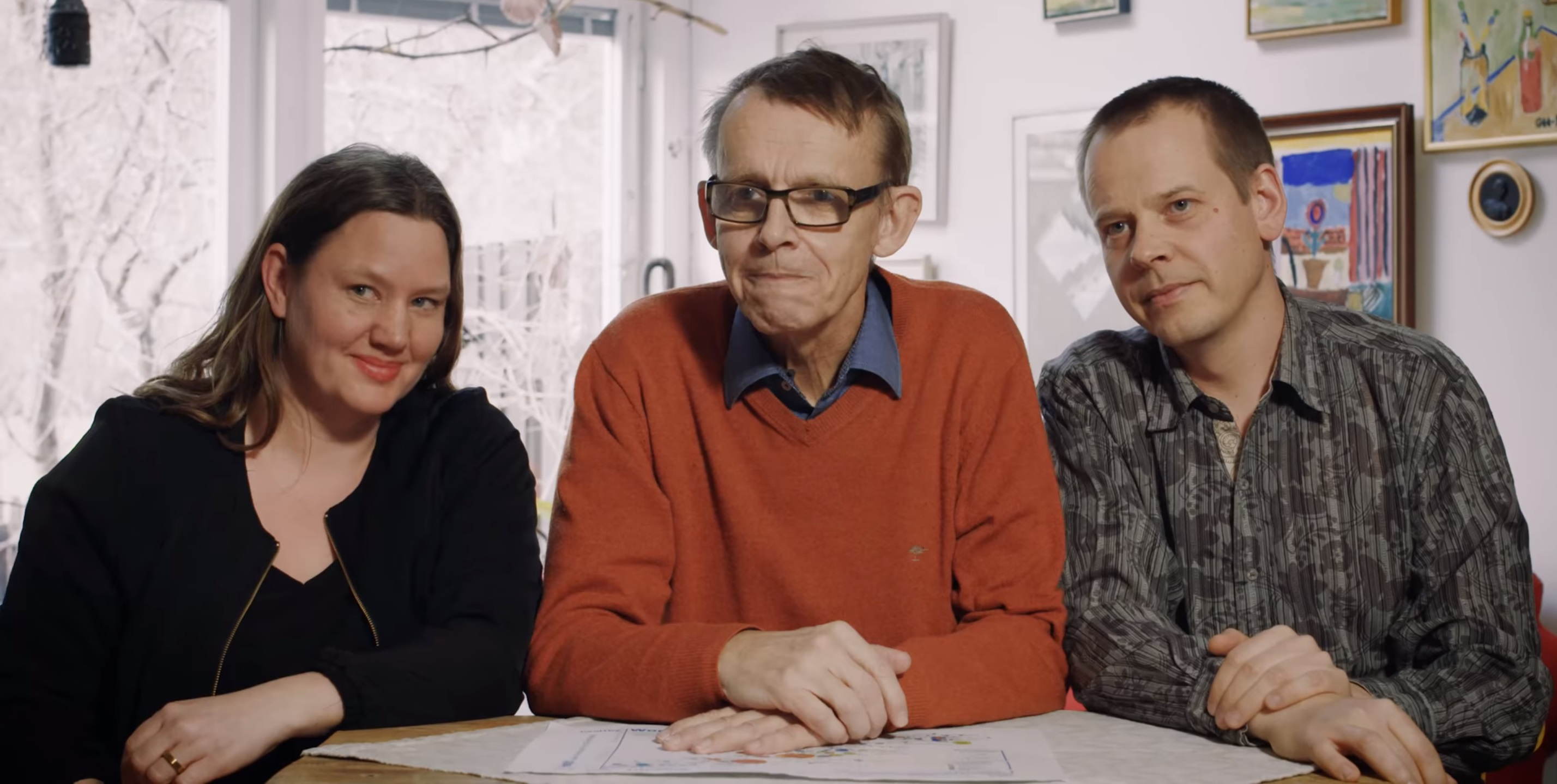
Left to right: Anna Rosling Rönnlund, Hans Rosling, and Ola Rosling discuss their book Factfulness in 2016.

=== Four income levels ===
Rosling criticizes the notion of dividing the world into the "developed world" and the "developing world" by calling it an outdated view. He shows that today most countries are "developed" and the others are not how developing countries were when the term became popular. Instead, he offers a four category model based on income per person (adjusted for price differences):

1. Level 1: less than $2 a day
2. Level 2: $2–$8 a day
3. Level 3: $8–$32 a day
4. Level 4: $32+ a day

He says that the majority of the countries in the world are on Level 2 or Level 3. A select few countries are on Level 1 and Level 4.

=== World getting better ===
The book also stresses that many people think the world is getting worse when, in fact, it is not. Early in the book the authors describe a survey in which 10,000 recipients were polled for their views on the state of the world. They interpret the survey’s results as showing that 80% of recipients knew less about the world than "chimps" would have, i.e. that they did worse than random guessing. This, the authors claim, shows that the media systematically skew data and trends and select stories to make people think that the world is getting worse.

=== Rules of thumb ===
Ten rules of thumb helping to avoid overdramatic interpretations
Number	Dramatic instinct	Example	Rule of thumb	Example
1	Gap instinct	'Look at the gap!'	Locate the majority	'Is there really a gap?'
2	Negativity instinct	'It's getting worse!'	Expect negative news	'Would improvement get attention?'
3	Straight line instinct	'It just continues!'	Imagine bending lines	'Why would this line not bend?'
4	Fear instinct	'It's scary!'	Calculate the risk	'Is it really dangerous?'
5	Size instinct	'It's big!'	Check the proportions	'Is it big in comparison?'
6	Generalization instinct	'They're all the same!'	Check your categories	'How are they different?'
7	Destiny instinct	'It never changes!'	Notice slow changes	'Isn't it always changing slowly?'
8	Single-perspective instinct	'This is the solution!'	Use multiple tools	'What other solutions exist?'
9	Blame instinct	'That's the bad guy!'	Resist pointing fingers	'What system made this possible?'
10	Urgency instinct	'It is now or never!'	Take small steps	'Can we take decisions as we go?'

== Reception ==
Jim O'Neill, reviewing for Nature, described the book as "a fabulous read, succinct and lively", and believed Rosling's use of multiple-choice questions throughout the book "enlivens the chapters". Criticism was directed towards it not being comprehensive, with O'Neill noting ongoing challenges such as antimicrobial resistance being omitted. He concluded that "a just tribute to this book and the man would be a global day of celebration for facts about our world."

After criticism of Factfulness on the website of TOP, The Overpopulation Project, Ola Rosling responded to the criticism as on-line comment where he emphasized the educational purpose of the book and asked for questions about what people really know about the state of the world. That request was met by TOP in second blog post wherein also Ola Rosling responded.

Bill Gates has cited Factfulness as "one of the best books [he's] ever read." In an interview with Time, Gates states that Factfulness "offers clear, actionable advice for how to overcome our innate biases and see the world more factfully." In particular, Gates found the four income levels framework a "revelation". Of the ten rules of thumb given in the book, Gates worries most about the blame instinct, not for creating scapegoats, but for turning people into heroes. In June 2018, Bill Gates offered free copies, to all new graduates of U.S. colleges and universities.

== See also ==
- Gapminder Foundation
