= Japan Society for Bioscience, Biotechnology, and Agrochemistry =

The Japan Society for Bioscience, Biotechnology, and Agrochemistry (JSBBA) is a scientific society dedicated to bioscience, biotechnology and agrochemistry, founded in 1924 as the Agricultural Chemical Society of Japan. The society took its current name in 1989.

In 1957, it was officially recognized as a society by the Ministry of Education, Science, Sports, and Culture of Japan. The current membership consists of researchers, technologists, students and private organizations in various fields of bioscience and biotechnology.
