= Ola Rosling =

Swedish statistician

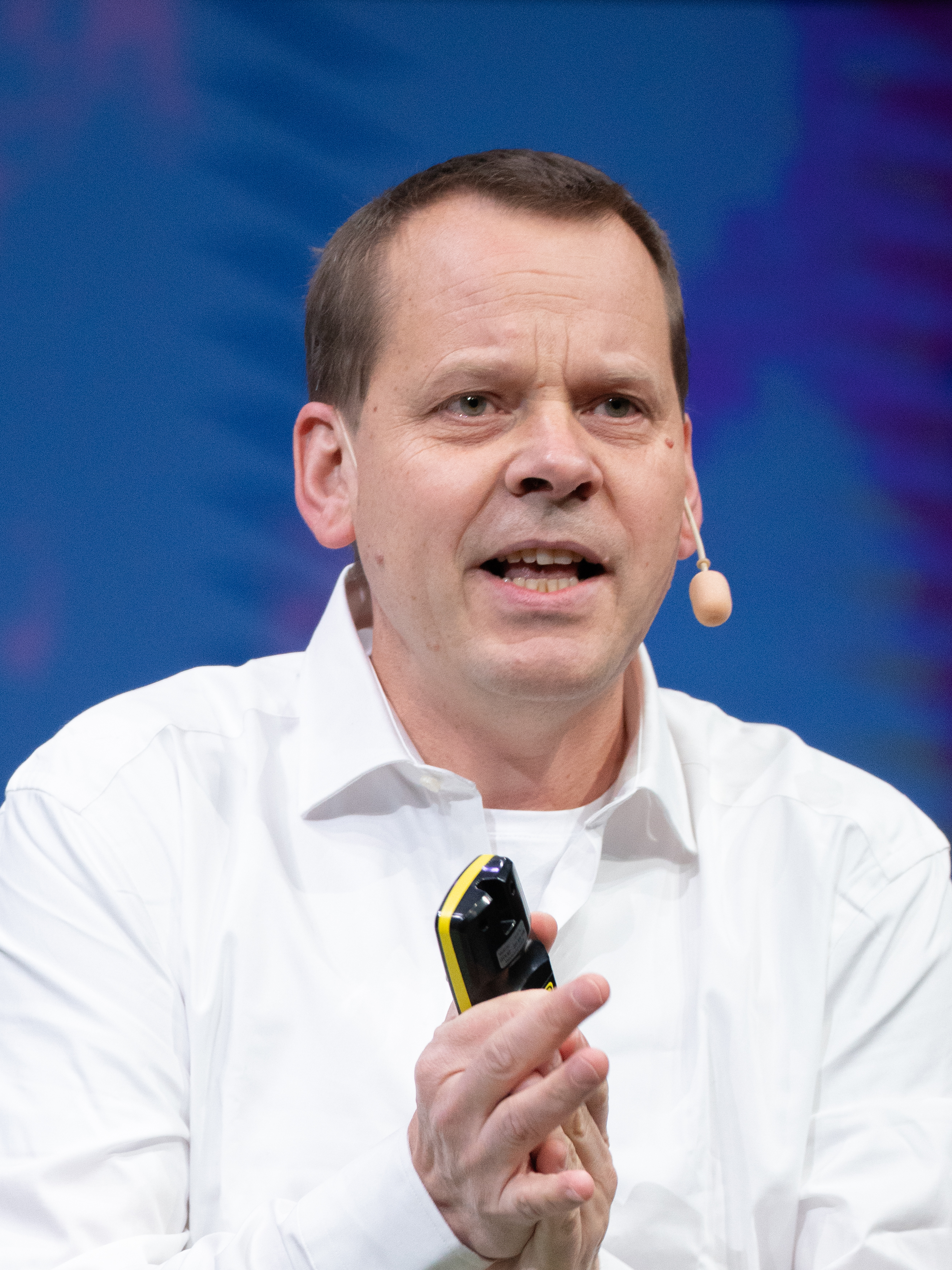
- Rosling at 2024 Nobel Week
- Born: November 1, 1975 (age 50); Uppsala, Sweden
- Occupation: Statistician
- Spouse: Anna Rosling Rönnlund
- Father: Hans Rosling

Ola Rosling (born 1 November 1975) is a Swedish statistician known for his work for the Gapminder Foundation on changing the global quality of life. He is the chairman, director and co-founder of the foundation.

== Career ==
Rosling co-founded the Gapminder Foundation together with his wife Anna Rosling Rönnlund and his father Hans Rosling. Ola led the development of the Trendalyzer software that creates interactive graphics from statistical datasets. The software was bought by Google in 2007 and Rosling and his team worked for Google from then on. He became Google's Public Data product manager.

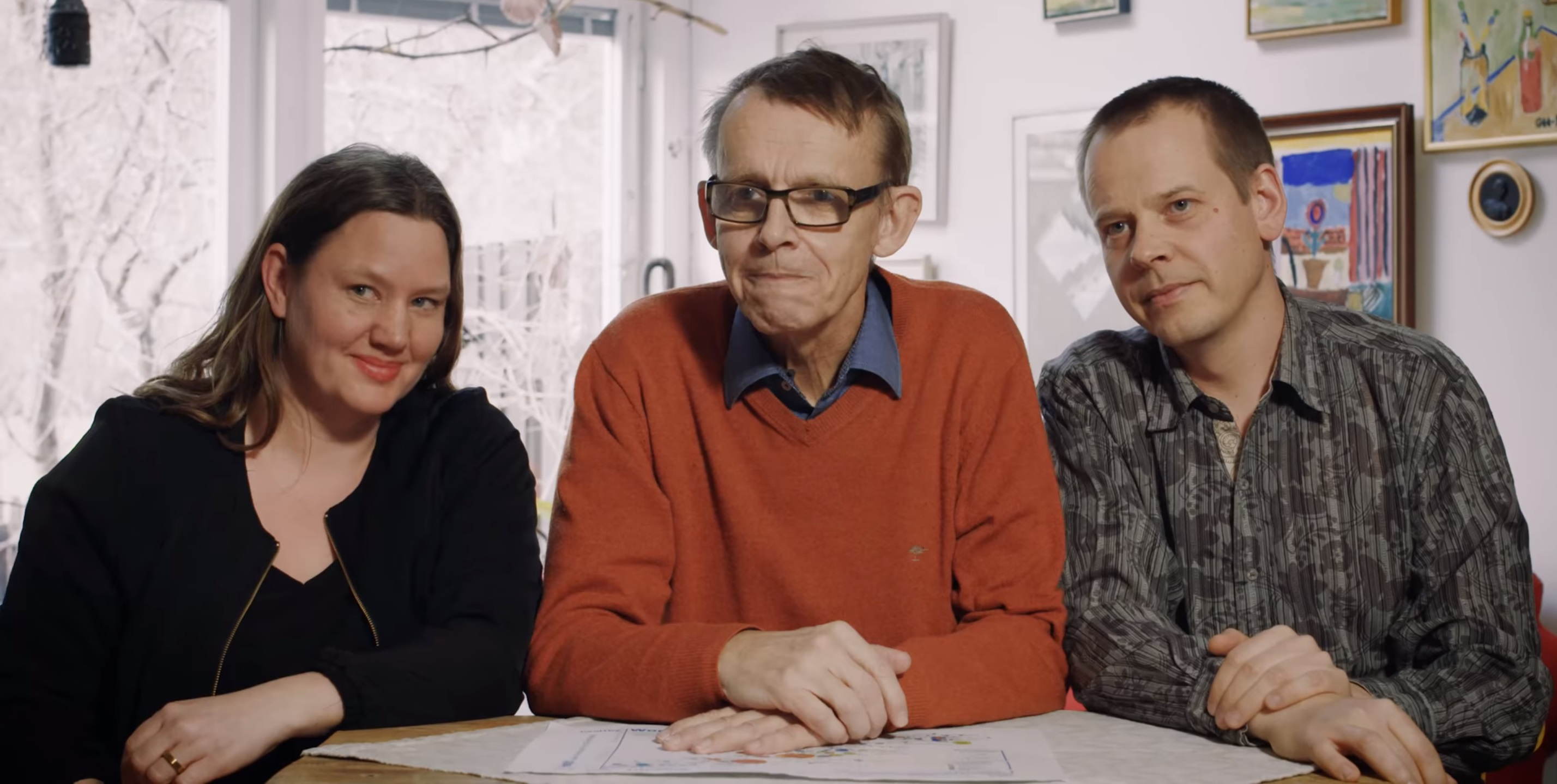
Left to right: Anna Rosling Rönnlund, Hans Rosling, and Ola Rosling discuss their book "Factfulness" in 2016.

Ola and Anna Rosling collaborated with Hans Rosling and co-authored the book called Factfulness.

== Publication ==
- Hans Rosling; Ola Rosling; Anna Rosling Rönnlund (2018). Factfulness: Ten Reasons We're Wrong About the World – and Why Things Are Better Than You Think. Flatiron Books. p. 288. ISBN 9781250123817.
