= Hans Rosling =

Swedish statistician and public speaker (1948–2017)

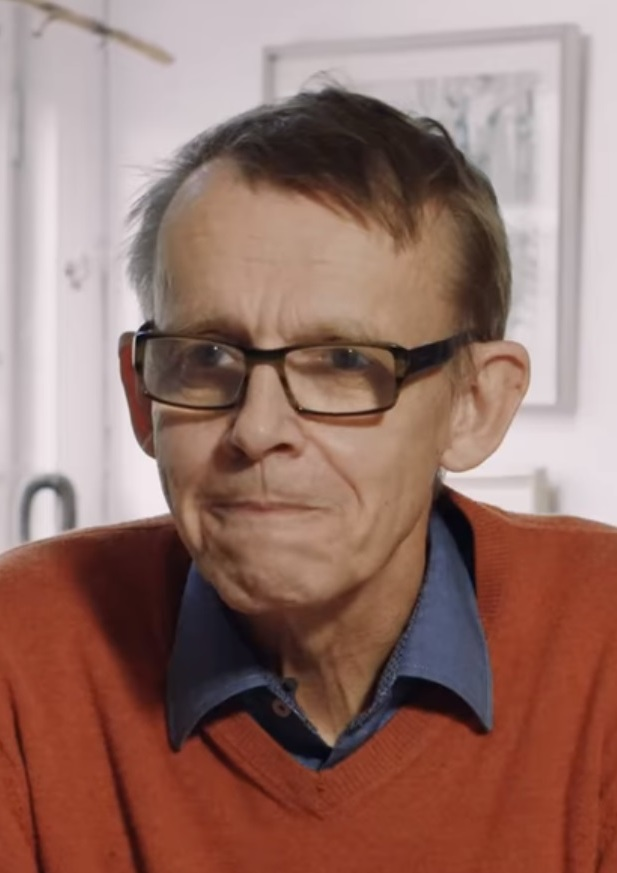
- Rosling in 2016
- Born: 27 July 1948; Uppsala, Sweden
- Died: 7 February 2017 (aged 68); Uppsala, Sweden
- Citizenship: Swedish
- Education: Uppsala University (PhD); St. John's Medical College
- Known for: Video lectures on global health
- Spouse: Agneta Thordeman (m. 1972, died)
- Children: 3 (including Ola Rosling)
- Awards: The World's 100 Most Influential People: 2012; Grierson Awards - Best Science Documentary: 2011; Honorary chieftainship - Liberia
- Scientific career
- Workplaces: Karolinska Institutet
- Thesis: Cassava, Cyanide, and Epidemic Spastic Paraparesis: A Study in Mozambique on Dietary Cyanide Exposure (1986)
- Website: www.gapminder.org

Hans Rosling (Swedish: [ˈhɑːns ˈrûːslɪŋ]; 27 July 1948 – 7 February 2017) was a Swedish physician, academic, and public speaker. He was a professor of international health at Karolinska Institute and was the co-founder and chairman of the Gapminder Foundation, which developed the Trendalyzer software system. Widely regarded as one of the most influential physicians and geographers in the modern world, he held presentations around the world, including several TED Talks in which he promoted the use of data (and data visualization) to explore development issues. His posthumously published book Factfulness, coauthored with his daughter-in-law Anna Rosling Rönnlund and son Ola Rosling, became an international bestseller.

== Life and career ==
Rosling was born in Uppsala, Sweden, on 28 July 1948. From 1967 to 1974, he studied statistics and medicine at Uppsala University, and in 1972, he studied public health at St. John's Medical College, Bangalore, India. He became a licensed physician in 1976, and from 1979 to 1981, he served as district medical officer in Nacala in northern Mozambique. In 1981, he began investigating an outbreak of konzo, a paralytic disease first described in the Democratic Republic of the Congo. His investigations earned him a Ph.D. at Uppsala University in 1986. Rosling was dyslexic.

Rosling presented the television documentary The Joy of Stats, which was broadcast in the United Kingdom by BBC Four in December 2010 and has been made available on demand on BBC iPlayer since. He presented a documentary Don't Panic — The Truth about Population for the This World series using a Musion 3D projection display, which appeared on BBC Two in the UK in November 2013. In 2015 he presented the documentary Don't Panic: How to End Poverty in 15 Years, which was produced by Wingspan and aired on the BBC just ahead of the announcement of the United Nations's Sustainable Development Goals.

Rosling was a sword swallower, as demonstrated in the final moments of his second talk at the TED conference. In 2009 he was listed as one of 100 leading global thinkers by Foreign Policy, and in 2011 as one of 100 most creative people in business by Fast Company. In 2011 he was elected member of the Swedish Academy of Engineering Sciences and in 2012 as member of the Swedish Academy of Sciences. He was included in the Time 100 list of the world's 100 most influential people in 2012.

=== Work in healthcare ===
Rosling spent two decades studying outbreaks of konzo, a paralytic disease, in remote rural areas across Africa and supervised more than 10 PhD students. His work with Julie Cliff, Johannes Mårtensson, Per Lundqvist, and Bo Sörbo found that outbreaks occur among hunger-stricken rural populations in Africa where a diet dominated by insufficiently processed cassava results in simultaneous malnutrition and high dietary cyanide intake.

Rosling's research also concerned other links between economic development, agriculture, poverty, and health. He worked as full-time consultant to the Swedish International Development Cooperation Agency (Sida) on primary health care from 1984 to 1990 and then as their consultant on HIV until 1994, traveling often to Sida program countries. He was at this time based at the Maternal and Child Care Department (International) at Uppsala University. He was a health adviser to the World Health Organization, UNICEF and several aid agencies. In 1993 he was one of the initiators of Médecins Sans Frontières in Sweden. At Karolinska Institutet he was head of the Division of International Health (IHCAR) from 2001 to 2007. As chairman of the Karolinska International Research and Training Committee (1998–2004), he started health research collaborations with universities in Asia, Africa, the Middle East, and Latin America. He started new courses on global health and co-authored a textbook on global health that promotes a fact-based worldview.

=== Trendalyzer and Gapminder ===
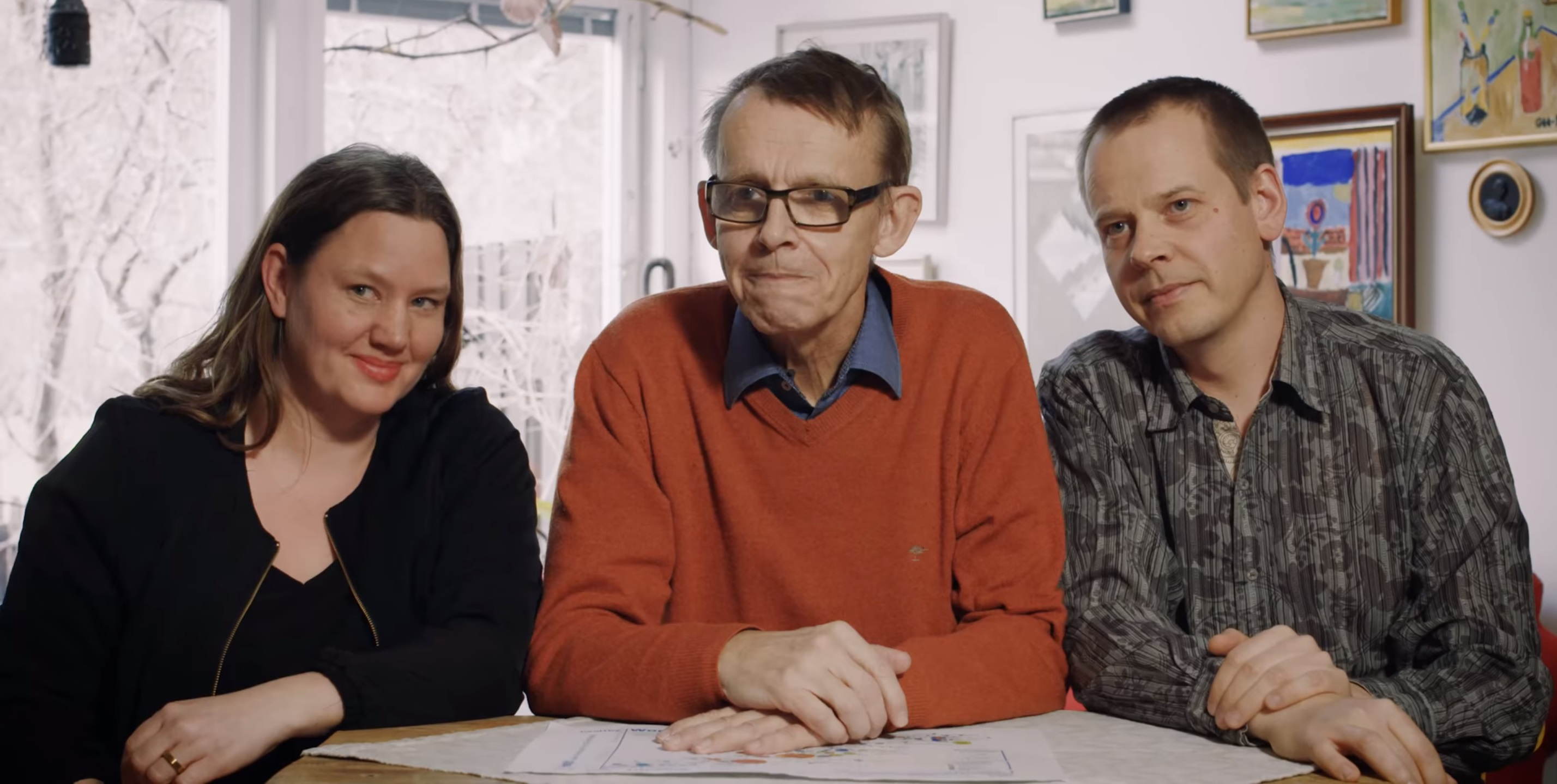
Left to right: Anna Rosling Rönnlund, Hans Rosling, and Ola Rosling discuss their book Factfulness in 2016.

Rosling's son, Ola Rosling, built the Trendalyzer software to animate data compiled by the UN and the World Bank that helped him explain the world with graphics. Rosling co-founded the Gapminder Foundation together with his son Ola and daughter-in-law Anna Rosling Rönnlund to develop Trendalyzer to convert international statistics into moving, interactive graphics. The provocative presentations that have resulted have made him famous, and his lectures using Gapminder graphics to visualize world development have won awards. The interactive animations are freely available from the Foundation's website.

Hans Rosling narrates "Why Boat Refugees Don't Fly! – Factpod 16", a video about the European refugee/migrant crisis produced by the Gapminder Foundation.

In March 2007, Google acquired the Trendalyzer software with the intention to scale it up and make it freely available for public statistics. In 2008, Google made available a Motion Chart Google Gadget and in 2009 the Public Data Explorer.

== Personal life and death ==
When he was 20, in 1968, doctors told Rosling that there was something wrong with his liver and as a consequence, he stopped drinking alcohol. Aged 29, with a young family, he had testicular cancer which was successfully treated. In 1989, he was diagnosed with hepatitis C. Over the years this progressed and he developed liver cirrhosis. At the beginning of 2013, he was in the early stages of liver failure. However, at the same time, new hepatitis C drugs were released and he went to Japan to buy the drugs needed to treat the infection. He expressed concerns in the media over the restricted use of the new drugs due to high costs, stating that it is a crime not to give every person with hepatitis C access to the drugs.

Rosling was diagnosed with pancreatic cancer in 2016, and died of the disease on 7 February 2017.

== Awards ==
- 2006 – Enlightener of the Year from the Swedish Skeptics Association
- 2010 – The Gannon Award for the Continued Pursuit of Human Advancement (US)
- 2010 – Illis quorum medal
- 2012 – Time 100 most influential people list
- 2012 – Harvard Humanitarian Award
- 2014 – Honorary Doctor at Uppsala University, Sweden
- 2014 – The Patron's Medal from the Royal Geographical Society of London
- 2017 – United Nations Population Award

== Reception of Rosling's views ==
Rosling is commonly described as an optimist, though he personally rejected the label. In his posthumous book Factfulness: Ten Reasons We're Wrong About the World – and Why Things Are Better Than You Think he wrote "The five global risks that concern me most are the risks of a global pandemic, financial collapse, world war, climate change, and extreme poverty." In summary, he wrote, "People often call me an optimist, because I show them the enormous progress they didn't know about. That makes me angry. I'm not an optimist. That makes me sound naive. I'm a very serious "possibilist". That's something I made up. It means someone who neither hopes without reason, nor fears without reason, someone who constantly resists the overdramatic worldview. As a possibilist, I see all this progress, and it fills me with conviction and hope that further progress is possible. This is not optimistic. It is having a clear and reasonable idea about how things are. It is having a worldview that is constructive and useful."

In his later years he advocated on behalf of refugees from Syria and partnered with the United Nations High Commissioner for Refugees (UNHCR) in this effort. In his last book he wrote repeatedly about the tragedy of the war in Syria saying: "The Syrian conflict will most likely prove to be the deadliest in the world since the Ethiopian-Eritrean war of 1998 to 2000."

However, some experts consider Rosling's world-view excessively rose-tinted, or anti-environmental. For instance, in The One-Sided Worldview of Hans Rosling Christian Berggren, a Swedish professor of industrial management, argues that Factfulness, "presents a highly biased sample of statistics as the true perspective on global development, avoids analysis of negative trends, and refrains from discussing difficult issues". Seeing Rosling as more optimist than "possibilist", Berggren remarks that, "Factfulness includes many graphs of 'bad things in decline' and 'good things on the rise' but not a single graph of 'bad things on the rise'." In 2013 in The Ecologist Robin Maynard reported Rosling as raging against the UN's population projections, and against some ecological objections to development: "I don't give a damn about polar bears! I can live without polar bears." Related to this criticism is that Rosling et al. in the book Factfulness do not accurately describe the threat that humanity pose against wild species and habitats.

Hence, Rosling has been criticized as being Pollyannaist about the global political situation in the face of tragedies such as the long-running conflict in Syria, among others. His work on population growth has also been criticized by Paul R. Ehrlich, the U.S. biologist and Professor of Population Studies at Stanford University, and Anne H. Ehrlich, associate director of the Center for Conservation Biology at Stanford University, in an article, published online by the MAHB, titled "A Confused Statistician." The Ehrlichs also warn that, while some trends that Rosling cites may indeed be positive, there is the possibility of total collapse of those trends if social and political instabilities occur. Related to this criticism, the sociologist Roland Paulsen has criticized Rosling for not taking into account inequalities in human societies.

Max Roser saw this differently, writing in his obituary for Rosling: "In portraits of Rosling, he was too often presented as an "optimist" that tells the world that things will turn out well. This is wrong. What Rosling did was to present the empirical evidence up to the present, and he showed that many vastly underestimate the progress that the world has made in improving living conditions globally. The majority of the world is better off now than at any point in history before. This was his positive message. But he never suggested that this should give anyone any reason to be complacent. He always used his fame to draw attention to the living conditions of the worst off and to denounce the lack of support they were receiving from the large group of people in the world that is living in unprecedented comfort. Hans Rosling's message was never that all is good; the enthusiasm for his work came from the fact that he was always convinced that a better world is possible if we care to work towards it."

== Selected publications ==
External videos
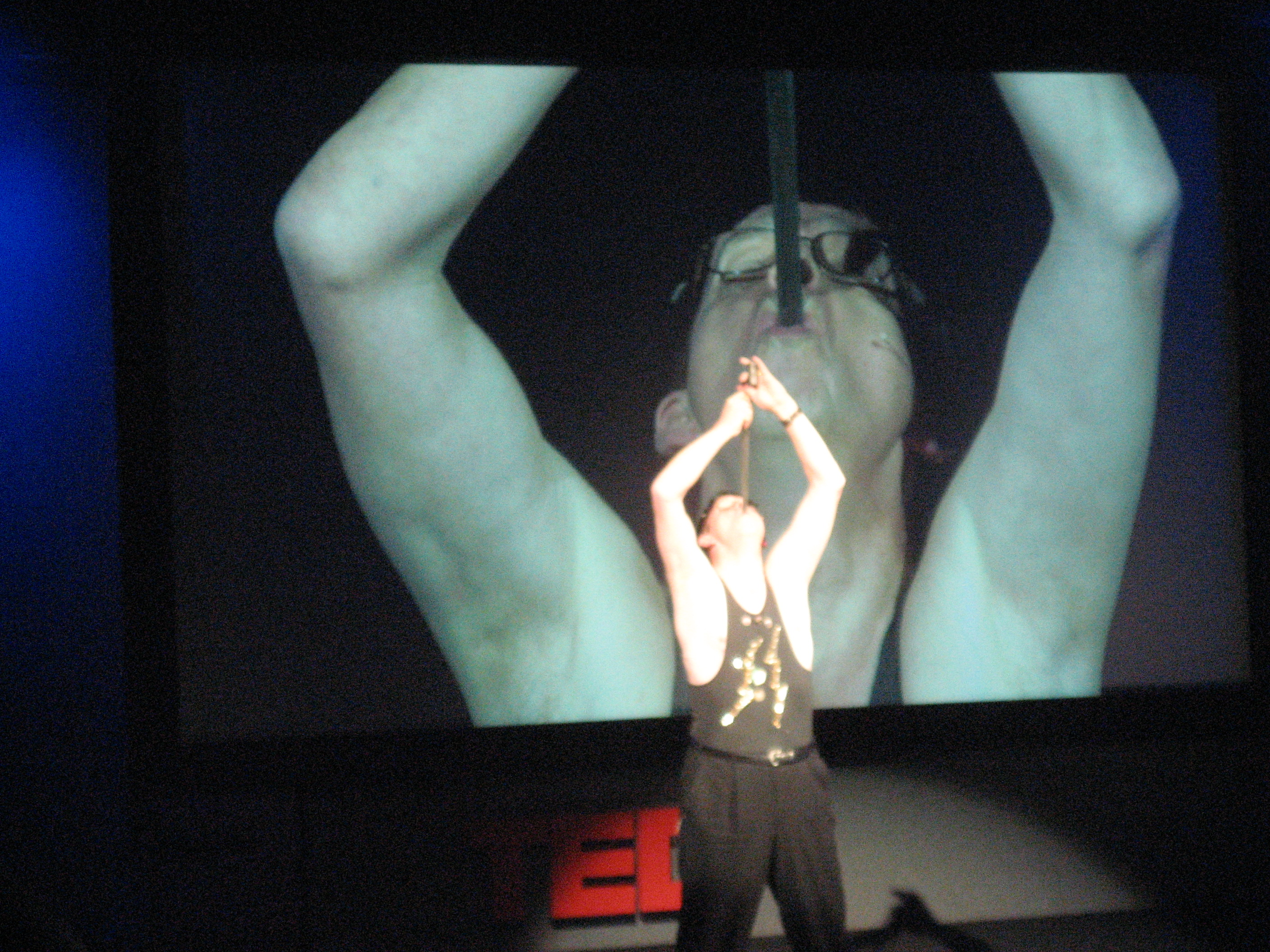
- The Best Stats You've Ever Seen
- Hans Rosling: Religions and babies
- How Not to Be Ignorant About the World All from TED Talks

- Thorson, A.; Ragnarsson, A.; Rosling, H.; Ekström, A. (2010). "Male circumcision reduces HIV transmission. The risk of transmission from woman to man is halved". Läkartidningen. 107 (46): 2881–2883. PMID 21197783.
- Hanson, S.; Thorson, A.; Rosling, H.; Örtendahl, C.; Hanson, C.; Killewo, J.; Ekström, A. M. (2009). Husereau, Don (ed.). "Estimating the Capacity for ART Provision in Tanzania with the Use of Data on Staff Productivity and Patient Losses". PLOS ONE. 4 (4) e5294. Bibcode:2009PLoSO...4.5294H. doi:10.1371/journal.pone.0005294. PMC 2667213. PMID 19381270.
- Von Schreeb, J.; Riddez, L.; Samnegård, H.; Rosling, H. (2008). "Foreign field hospitals in the recent sudden-onset disasters in Iran, Haiti, Indonesia, and Pakistan". Prehospital and Disaster Medicine. 23 (2): 144–151, discussion 151–3. doi:10.1017/S1049023X00005768. PMID 18557294. S2CID 9830924.
- Schell, C. O.; Reilly, M.; Rosling, H.; Peterson, S.; Ekström, A. M. (2007). "Socioeconomic determinants of infant mortality: A worldwide study of 152 low-, middle-, and high-income countries". Scandinavian Journal of Public Health. 35 (3): 288–297. doi:10.1080/14034940600979171. PMID 17530551. S2CID 5976532.
- Von Schreeb, J.; Rosling, H.; Garfield, R. (2007). "Mortality in Iraq". The Lancet. 369 (9556): 101, author reply 103–4. doi:10.1016/S0140-6736(07)60058-0. PMID 17223462. S2CID 54388578.
- Elrayah, H.; Eltom, M.; Bedri, A.; Belal, A.; Rosling, H.; Ostenson, C. (2005). "Economic burden on families of childhood type 1 diabetes in urban Sudan". Diabetes Research and Clinical Practice. 70 (2): 159–165. doi:10.1016/j.diabres.2005.03.034. PMID 15919129.
- Thanh, H. T. T.; Jiang, G. X.; Van, T. N.; Minh, D. P. T.; Rosling, H.; Wasserman, D. (2005). "Attempted suicide in Hanoi, Vietnam". Social Psychiatry and Psychiatric Epidemiology. 40 (1): 64–71. doi:10.1007/s00127-005-0849-6. PMID 15624077. S2CID 24941902.
- Rosling, H. (2004). "New map of world health is needed. North and South is changed to healthy and ill and West to rich and poor". Läkartidningen. 101 (3): 198–201. PMID 14763091.
- Rosling, H.; Rosling, O.; Rosling Rönnlund, A. (2018). Factfulness: Ten Reasons We're Wrong About the World--and Why Things Are Better Than You Think. Flatiron Books. p. 288. ISBN 978-1-250-12381-7.
- Rosling, H.; Härgestam, F. (2020). How I Learned to Understand the World: A Memoir. Flatiron Books. p. 256. ISBN 9781250266897
