= Gapminder Foundation =

Swedish non-profit organization

Logo

Gapminder Foundation is a non-profit venture registered in Stockholm, Sweden, that promotes sustainable global development and achievement of the United Nations Millennium Development Goals by increased use and understanding of statistics and other information about social, economic, and environmental development at local, national, and global levels.

Gapminder was founded in 2005 by Ola Rosling, Anna Rosling Rönnlund, and Hans Rosling. The name Gapminder was derived from the "Mind the Gap" warning messages on the London Underground.

== Overview ==
Hans Rosling, a founding board of the Gapminder Foundation, narrates "Why Boat Refugees Don't Fly! - Factpod 16", a video produced by the Gapminder Foundation.

The Foundation initially developed the Trendalyzer software, which produced the now famous animated bubble graph. This software was acquired by Google in March 2006 and the team of developers for Gapminder joined Google in April 2007.

The current version of Trendalyzer is Gapminder Tools, a web-service displaying time series of development statistics for all countries and many sub-national regions.

The current president of the foundation is Ola Rosling. Anna Rosling Rönnlund is the foundation's vice president.

== Projects ==
World Income Distribution: Gapminder World (2015)

The Gapminder Foundation has produced several other projects, including:

- World Income Distribution, an interactive display of statistics on household income distribution for Bangladesh, Brazil, China, India, Indonesia, Japan, Nigeria, Pakistan, the USA, and the World as a whole in each year from 1970 to 1998.
- Dollar Street, an interactive display of the world as a street. The street number is the daily income per person in the family. All people of the world live on Dollar Street. The poorest live on the left end and the richest on the extreme right end. All other people live in between on a continuous scale of daily incomes.
- Human Development Trends 2003, a linear thematic Flash presentation is developed with United Nations Development Programme (UNDP) for the release of the Human Development Report 200.
- World Health Chart 2001, a display of 50 to 100 years of health development for all countries of the World with time series for 35 indicators provided by the World Health Organization.

== Mission statement ==
Gapminder's stated mission is "Fighting devastating ignorance with fact-based worldviews everyone can understand."

The object of the Foundation is to promote sustainable global development and the achievement of the United Nations Millennium Goals by increasing the use and understanding of statistics and other information about social, economic, and environmental development at local, national, and global levels.

The object of the Foundation shall be achieved by:

1. use and development of information technology for easily understandable visualization of statistics and other information;
2. ownership, protection, and free dissemination of development results;
3. use, together with various cooperation partners, of the development results to make statistics and other information about development available and understandable to broad user groups via the Internet and other media.

== See also ==
- Factfulness
- Our World In Data
