= Trendalyzer =

Information visualization software

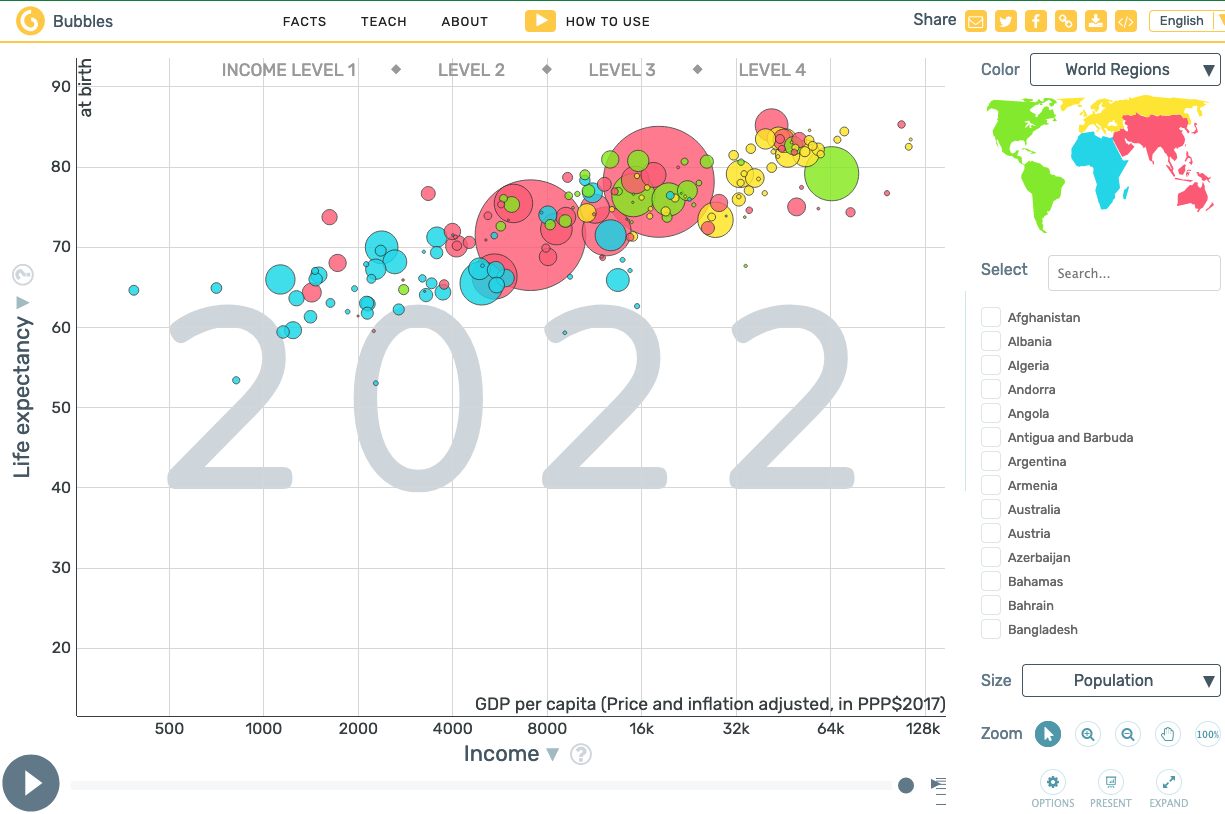
- An example of Trendalyzer software
- Developer: Gapminder Foundation
- Website: Gapminder Tools Offline

Trendalyzer is an information visualization software program for animation of statistics that was initially developed by Hans Rosling's Gapminder Foundation in Sweden. In March 2007, it was acquired by Google Inc. The current beta version is a Flash application that is preloaded with statistical and historical data about the development of the countries of the world.

The information visualization technique used by Trendalyzer is an interactive bubble chart. By default it shows five variables: Two numeric variables on the X and Y axes, bubble size and colour, and a time variable that may be manipulated with a slider. The software uses brushing and linking techniques for displaying the numeric value of a highlighted country.

Components of the Trendalyzer software, particularly the Flash-based Motion Chart gadget, have become available for public use as part of the Google Visualizations API (see ).

== Similar projects ==
- Trend Compass (flash)
- Eurostat explorer (flash)
