= Charles Nam =

American sociologist

Charles B. Nam was born in Lynbrook, New York on March 25, 1926, and currently resides in Tallahassee, Florida. He was a professor of Sociology for 31 years with one of his most important contributions being the Nam-Powers Index measuring occupational status.

== Education ==
Charles Nam attended an Army Specialized Training Program at Harvard University in 1944, completed his Bachelor of Arts in Applied Statistics at New York University in 1950 and attended the University of North Carolina at Chapel Hill for both his master's degree in sociology (1957) as well as his Ph.D. (1959).

== Career ==
Charles Nam began his professional career at the Census Bureau in 1950. For more than three years, he was employed in the International Population Statistics Section, assisting subject matter specialists in the social statistics field. Following his time at the U.S. Bureau of the Census, Charles Nam work for the U.S. Air Force Human Resource Research Institute as an assistant project director on demographic studies of officers and airmen, leaving this position to attend graduate school. While pursuing his master's degree and PhD he was a research assistant on various demographic research projects at the University of North Carolina Institute for Research in Social Science, returning to the Census (1957) prior to completing his doctorate in sociology (1960).

At the U.S. Bureau of the Census (1957–1964) Nam was chief of the Education Statistics Section (1957–1961), helping to plan the 1960 census, preparing Current Population reports, and helping to train foreign students in census techniques. Later (1962–1964), Nam was the Chief of the Education and Social Stratification Branch where he was responsible for education, stratification and other social data. During this time he also was the project director for a study matching death certificates to census records.

Leaving the U.S. Bureau of the Census in 1964, Nam began his 31-year academic career at Florida State University. During the course of his academic career, he chaired the Department of Sociology and founded the Population and Manpower Research Center (which later became the Center for the Study of Population and even later became the Center for Demography and Population Health). He directed the center for its first 14 years and was Associate Center Director again for the early 1990s.

Nam is the author or co-author of more than a dozen books. He wrote Education of the American Population with John Folger in 1967, and The Socioeconomic Approach to Status Measurement with Mary Powers in 1983. He co-wrote two handbooks on immigration (International Handbook of Internal Migration with David F. Sly and William Serow in 1990 and Handbook of International Migration with William Serow, David Sly and Robert Weller in 1990). Living and Dying in the USA: Health, Behavioral and Social Forces of Adult Mortality (2002) was his last academic book written in English. Most recently, he published The Golden Door, an historical novel (2006).

One of his most important contributions was his work on the Nam-Powers Index, which was developed in the 1950s and expanded upon by Nam and several colleagues (specifically Mary Powers, E. Walter Terrie and Monica Boyd) over the years (see Nam and Boyd 2004 for details). The Nam-Powers index was created to estimate the living conditions of a typical person in a particular occupation. This work was highlighted in several of Charles Nam's publications and has been adopted by sociologists as one of the key measures of socioeconomic status (typically measured by education, income and occupation).

Over the course of his academic career his research was funded by more than a dozen different agencies, totaling more than a million dollars in grant funding from agencies like the National Institute of Child Health and Human Development, the U.S. Department of Education, and the National Science Foundation, among others. Charles Nam has also published extensively, with nearly two dozen articles in the demography and sociology of education, another near-dozen in social stratification, another 17 in general demography and more than two dozen focusing on mortality. These publications have been included in some of the most prestigious journals in his field:

Demography, American Sociological Review, Social Forces, Population Research and Policy Review, Population and Environment, Social Biology, and Social Science & Medicine. One of his articles was highlighted in a commemorative issue of Social Biology as one of their thirty most frequently cited articles in the journal's history (Sex Predetermination: Its Impact on Fertility, with Gerald Markle).

Beyond publishing and conducting funded research, Nam also had major editorial roles at Sociology of Education, Demography, Population and Environment, Journal of the American Statistical Association, Population Research and Policy Review, and Social Biology. He was President of the Population Association of America (1979) and the Southern Sociological Society (1981–1982). He was founder and chair of the American Sociological Association's Section on Sociology of Population (1976–1978). He was named a fellow of the American Statistical Association (1980), the American Association for the Advancement of Science (2001) and the Southern Demographic Association (2001) (where he was also named Honorary President in 2007 for having been a founding member who never accepted the Presidency).
