= Long arm of childhood =

Lasting influence of early-life socioemotional conditions

The long arm of childhood refers to the lasting influence of early-life socioemotional conditions on an individual's health and life outcomes in adulthood. The concept is most commonly attributed to researchers Mark D. Hayward and Bridget K. Gorman, who explored this phenomenon in their paper "The Long Arm of Childhood: The Influence of Early-Life Social Conditions on Men's Mortality," published in the academic journal Demography. Their research highlights how socioeconomic status (SES), family, and childhood experiences shape long-term health trajectories, contributing to disparities in mortality and well-being later in life. The idea has since become a key framework in public health, sociology, and developmental psychology, emphasizing the critical role of early-life conditions in shaping adult health outcomes.

== Theoretical Foundations ==
=== Life course perspective ===
The life course perspective, developed by sociologists and psychologists in the 1960s (including sociologist Glen Elder Jr.), emphasizes the importance of time, context, and process in understanding human development. The theory suggests that individuals' lives are shaped by the historical time and place in which they live, their social relationships, and the timing of life events. In the context of the long arm of childhood, this perspective argues that early life experiences can set individuals on different trajectories that influence their health, SES, and overall well-being throughout adulthood. For example, exposure to poverty or high-quality education in childhood can have cascading effects on future opportunities and health outcomes.

=== Socioeconomic status ===
One key aspect of the long arm of childhood is the profound impact of childhood socioeconomic status (SES) on adult outcomes. Specifically, those individuals growing up in lower SES households had higher rates of functional limitations, cognitive impairment, and depressive symptoms in later life, even after controlling for adult SES. Further, data from the National Longitudinal Survey of Older Men showed that childhood SES was a significant predictor of mortality risk in adulthood, with its effects persisting even after accounting for lifestyle factors and adult socioeconomic achievements.

=== Cumulative disadvantage theory ===
Proposed by Robert K. Merton in 1988, the cumulative disadvantage theory explains how initial comparative advantage (or disadvantage) of trained capacity, structural location, and available resources make for successive increments of advantage (or disadvantage). Examining this within the long arm of childhood, the theory suggests that early advantages, such as growing up in a wealthy family or receiving high-quality education, can accumulate over time, leading to better health outcomes and longevity. Conversely, early disadvantages can compound, resulting in poorer health and shorter lifespans. Cumulative disadvantage helps explain why childhood circumstances can have such profound and lasting effects on adult outcomes.

== Key Studies & Findings ==
=== SHARE Study ===
The Survey of Health, Ageing and Retirement in Europe (SHARE) is a multidisciplinary and cross-national panel database of micro data on health, socio-economic status, and social and family networks. A 2020 study by the Centre for Longitudinal Studies in the UK used SHARE data combined with a novel dried blood spot dataset to examine the relationship between childhood circumstances and inflammation in later life. They found that parental education levels were negatively associated with C-reactive protein (CRP) levels in adulthood. CRP is a marker of inflammation associated with various health problems, including cardiovascular disease. This study provided biological evidence for the long-term effects of childhood socioeconomic conditions on adult health.

=== Normative Aging Study ===
A study conducted by Boston University in 2015 used data from the VA Normative Aging Study, a longitudinal study of aging in men that began in the 1960s. The researchers examined the life histories of 1,076 men, looking at how childhood experiences affected longevity and found that both positive and negative childhood experiences had independent effects on lifespan. Specifically, they identified that childhood psychosocial stressors - such as parental divorce or death - and low childhood SES were associated with increased exposure to stressful life events in midlife, which in turn predicted reduced longevity. Having close relationships in childhood was associated with greater life satisfaction in midlife, which contributed to increased longevity.

=== Health and Retirement Study ===
The Health and Retirement Study is a longitudinal panel study that surveys a representative sample of approximately 20,000 Americans over the age of 50 every two years. Their analysis focused on how childhood SES affects various health outcomes in later life, including self-reported physical health, depression, and cognitive function. This study showed that individuals who experienced upward socioeconomic mobility (i.e., achieving a higher SES in adulthood than their childhood SES) show better health outcomes compared to those who remained in low SES. However, this upward mobility did not completely negate the effects of childhood disadvantage, supporting the idea that childhood circumstances have a lasting impact on health.

=== IIASA Study & Latency of the Long Arm of Childhood ===
The International Institute for Applied Systems Analysis (IIASA) conducted a 2018 study that used data from various European countries to examine the long-term effects of childhood conditions on health satisfaction in later life. They found that the impact of childhood circumstances on health satisfaction becomes more pronounced in older age groups, even after controlling for adult SES. This study suggests that the long arm of childhood may have effects that remain hidden or latent until later in life, emphasizing the importance of considering the entire life course when studying health outcomes.

== Health Outcomes due to The Long Arm of Childhood ==
=== Health outcomes ===
The "long arm of childhood" refers to the lasting impact that early life experiences, particularly adverse childhood experiences (ACEs), can have on a person's health into adulthood. Even though these difficult experiences are in the past, they can still contribute to a higher risk of developing physical and mental health issues like heart disease, diabetes, depression, anxiety, substance abuse, and chronic pain. These health disadvantages reduce access to higher education and well-paying jobs, limiting economic mobility. Additionally, childhood health issues can lead to long-term physical and mental health problems, further restricting opportunities for social and economic advancement.

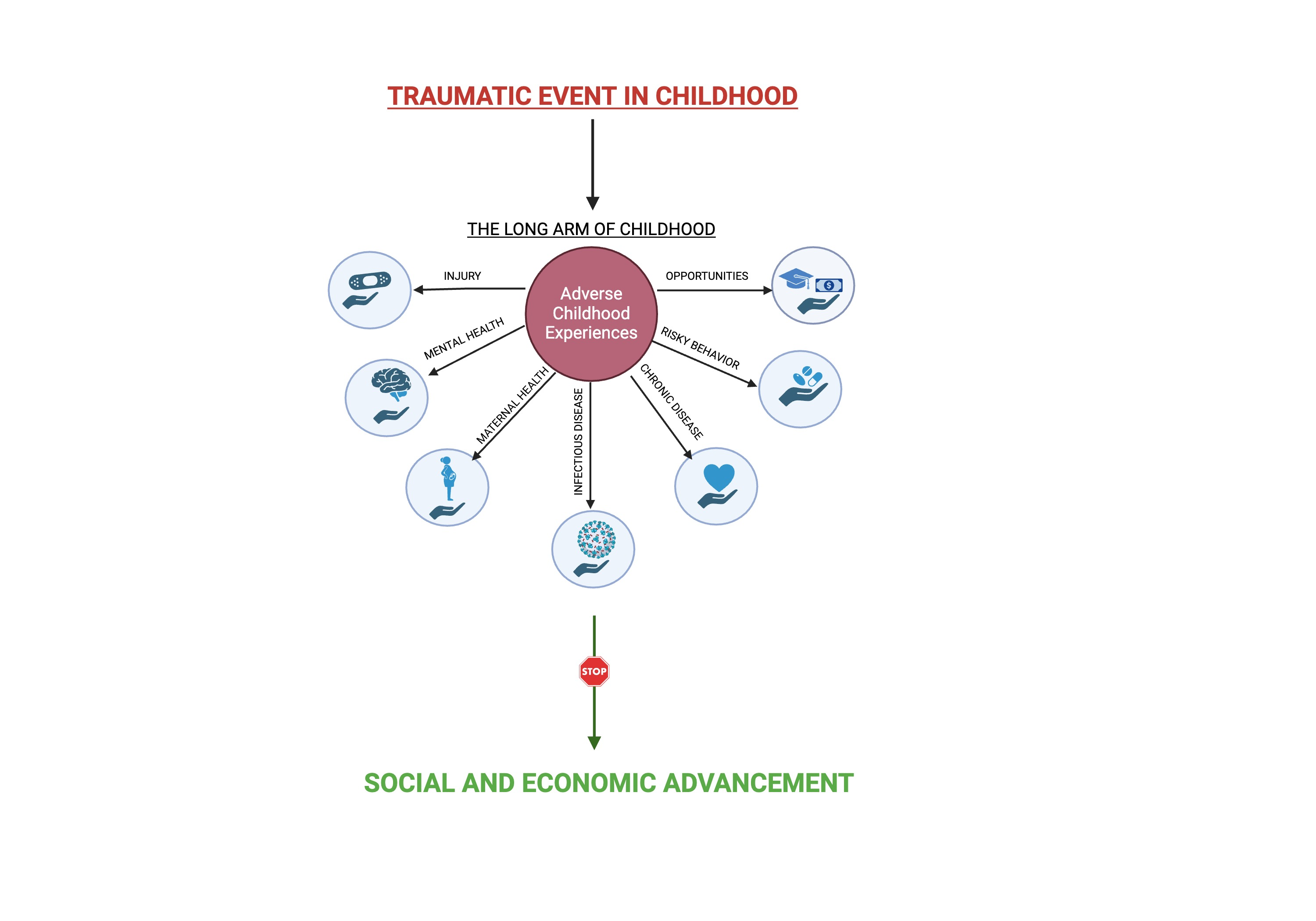
This web diagram depicts the health outcomes resulting from adverse childhood experiences (ACEs) and how these may hinder social and economic development.

=== Childhood to adulthood ===
Children from lower socioeconomic backgrounds often face higher exposure to stressors such as poverty, family instability, and limited access to healthcare, which contribute to traumatic events. About one in four kids experiences a potentially traumatic event, and research has long shown a strong connection between adverse childhood experiences (ACEs) and poor health outcomes. Experiencing multiple ACEs can lead to chronic stress and adversity, which take a serious toll on a child's development. Growing up in an unsafe environment puts kids at higher risk for issues with brain development, immune function, and emotional regulation. ACEs can even change the way neural networks form and disrupt important biological systems, which may speed up aging, increase the risk of disease, and weaken the immune system.

Adults who have experienced ACEs often report worse mental and physical health, more severe symptoms of illness, and overall poorer life outcomes. They are at higher risk for challenges like getting into trouble with the law, struggling in school, and having lower resilience in difficult situations. These health disparities often align with socioeconomic background, and early-life health inequalities perpetuate cycles of disadvantage, deepening social stratification across generations.

=== Physical health ===
The lasting impact can significantly affect physical health by increasing inflammation and disrupting the body's stress response system. Research has shown that certain health behaviors, such as smoking, alcohol consumption, poor diet, physical inactivity, and higher BMI, are linked to elevated inflammation, which contributes to chronic health conditions.

=== Toxic stress response ===
ACEs can interfere with the development of the stress response system, making individuals more sensitive to stress as they grow older. When children experience severe or prolonged adversity without adequate support, they may develop a toxic stress response, keeping their stress system activated for extended periods.This prolonged activation can lead to lasting changes in brain development, increasing the risk of both psychological and physical health problems in adulthood, such as cardiovascular disease, obesity, and weakened immune function.

=== Mental health ===
The "long arm of childhood" has a profound impact on mental health, as ACEs are strongly linked to a range of psychological disorders in adulthood. Research has shown that nearly one in three adult mental health conditions can be traced back to ACE exposure. Mental health conditions such as depression, ADHD, anxiety, suicidality, bipolar disorder, and schizophrenia all show a dose-response relationship with ACEs, meaning that the more ACEs a person experiences, the greater the severity and likelihood of these disorders. As individuals transition into adulthood, those with untreated childhood mental health issues may struggle with employment stability, income security, and access to mental health care, reinforcing cycles of disadvantage. Social stratification amplifies mental health inequalities, as wealthier individuals can afford better healthcare and support systems, while disadvantaged groups face structural barriers to recovery and upward mobility.

== Competing Theories ==
Counterarguments to the "long arm of childhood" suggest that later life experiences can significantly alter, mitigate, and reverse the effects of early childhood conditions. Social mobility theory argues that individuals can change their socioeconomic status through education, career advancements, and social networks, thereby reducing the lasting impact of childhood disadvantages. Meanwhile, the life-span development theory posits that influences on well-being and success are not necessarily rooted in childhood but emerge and evolve across different stages of life, depending on contemporary circumstances and opportunities. These perspectives highlight the role of personal agency, resilience, and external support systems in shaping long-term outcomes, offering a more flexible and nuanced view of how early experiences interact with later life conditions.

=== Social mobility theory ===
Social mobility theory addresses how an individual's socioeconomic status changes relative to their parents or themselves throughout their life. Social mobility is measured using a variety of factors including income, earnings, education, health, and social class. Although achieving upward socioeconomic mobility has been shown to possibly overcome the "long arm of childhood," a 2023 study published in Demography suggests that individuals who experience any socioeconomic struggles in their childhood may still experience challenges in adulthood despite achieving upward socioeconomic mobility. The negative effects of early disadvantages are shown to accumulate over time, so the adverse experiences and trauma of childhood may never be fully erased.

=== Life-span developmental theory ===
The life-span developmental psychology framework, as proposed by psychologist Paul Baltes, offers a perspective that aligns with the concept of age-neutral influences on human development. This approach explains how development is a continuous process extending across the life span, from infancy through old age, and is not exclusively determined by early childhood experiences, as described in "the long arm of childhood". Baltes identified several key principles, including multidirectionality, which suggests that development involves both growth and decline in various domains throughout life, and plasticity, indicating that individuals possess the capacity for change in response to different experiences at any age.

== Implementing Solutions ==
Addressing the long-lasting impact that the "long arm of childhood" leaves on adults requires a multifaceted solution that includes early intervention programs, mental health treatment, and healthy lifestyle practices. The most effective solutions will not only diminish the effects of ACEs but will also promote practices that foster resilience and utmost well-being throughout childhood and adulthood. Additionally, one study found that upward socioeconomic mobility, although increasingly rare to achieve, can be profound in overcoming the long arm of childhood.

=== Early intervention programs ===
Early intervention programs are effective in providing extensive support to children who are experiencing adversity in their lives. This early support can help mitigate the negative effects of the long arm of childhood later in life. Organizations in the community can play a large role in ensuring that children have positive early life experiences. These organizations can be for-youth and faith-based groups that increase access to preschool programs, training, and childcare. Additionally the organizations provide skill and relationship building as well as provide support and crisis intervention when ACEs occur. Examples of these early intervention programs include Early Head Start, Adults and Children Together Against Violence: Parents Raising Safe Kids (ACT), SafeCare, and The Incredible Years.

=== Mental health treatment ===
Addressing the effects of childhood trauma can require mental health treatments that are based on individual needs. These treatment practices focus on mitigating the effects of ADHD, depression, anxiety, and other conditions that individuals exposed to ACEs can experience. These therapies include Cognitive Processing Therapy (CPT) and Cognitive Behavioral Therapy (CBT). CPT and CBT are effective treatment strategies that help individuals identify negative thoughts and behaviors that are caused by their trauma so they can learn to recover from them.

=== Upward socioeconomic mobility ===
A 2024 study done by the Journal of Public Health found that it is possible to overcome the effects of the long arm of childhood by achieving upward socioeconomic mobility. The study utilized factors such as grip strength, walking speed, and lung function. The study ultimately found that early health disparities are not permanent, and can be improved through better socioeconomic conditions for individuals who were at disadvantage earlier in their life.
