= Michaela Benzeval =

British sociologist

Michaela Jane Benzeval
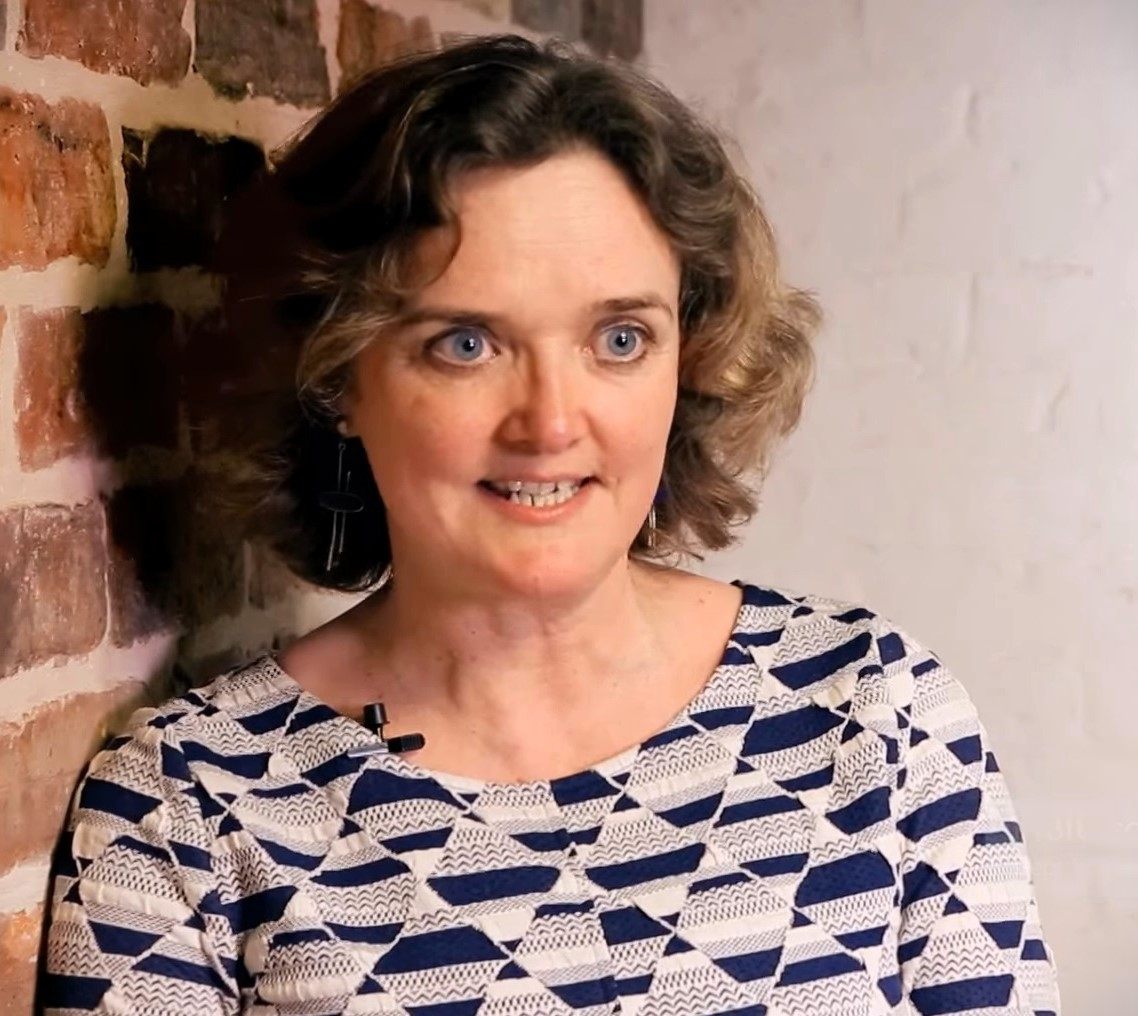
- Benzeval in 2015
- Education: University of Bath; University of London; University of Glasgow
- Scientific career
- Workplaces: University of Essex
- Thesis: What is the role of income in creating health inequalities? Evidence from cross-sectional and longitudinal studies (2011)
- Doctoral advisor: Sally Macintyre

Michaela Jane Benzeval CBE is a British sociologist, Professor and Director of Understanding Society at the University of Essex. She was appointed a Commander of the British Empire in the 2024 New Year Honours.

== Early life and education ==
Benzeval studied economics at the University of Bath. She moved to the University of London for her graduate studies, where she specialised in and health policy and epidemiology. In London she also completed a Postgraduate Certificate in Academic Practice. She completed her doctoral research at the University of Glasgow, where she investigated the role of income in driving health inequality with Sally Macintyre. She used the General Household Survey to explore the association between income and health. She found that income had a stronger association with health than education and class. She also showed that lone mothers and fathers had higher risk of ill health. She used the British Household Panel Survey to show that reductions in income and income volatility were associated with poor health.

== Research and career ==
After completing her doctorate Benzeval joined Queen Mary University of London, where she studied mental health of men and women in relationships. She found that enduring first relationships were associated with good mental health, and that women were more adversely affected by multiple partnership transitions than men.

Benzeval was a Programme Leader and Director for the West of Scotland Twenty-07 Study, which investigated the processes that cause and maintain social inequality.

She joined the University of Essex in 2015, when she was made a Professor and Director of the Institute for Social and Economic Research.

== Awards and honours ==
- 2022 Elected Fellow of the Academy of Social Sciences
- 2024 Appointed Commander of the British Empire in the 2024 New Year Honours

== Select publications ==
- Dodds, Richard M.; Syddall, Holly E.; Cooper, Rachel; et al. (2014). "Grip strength across the life course: normative data from twelve British studies". PLOS One. 9 (12) e113637. Bibcode:2014PLoSO...9k3637D. doi:10.1371/journal.pone.0113637. PMC 4256164. PMID 25474696. Wikidata Q34633437.
- R G Wilkinson (1998). "Income inequality and population health". Social Science & Medicine. 47 (3): 411–412. doi:10.1016/s0277-9536(98)00101-4. PMID 9681911. Wikidata Q74817355.
- Benzeval, Michaela; Judge, Ken (2001). "Income and health: the time dimension". Social Science & Medicine. 52 (9): 1371–1390. doi:10.1016/s0277-9536(00)00244-6. PMID 11286362. Wikidata Q34207291.
