= Blaxter =

Blaxter is a surname. Notable people with the surname include:

- Kenneth Blaxter (disambiguation), multiple people
- Mildred Blaxter (1925–2010), British sociologist and writer
- Blaxter family, owners of Badenyon

== See also ==
- Baxter (name)
- Blaxterr Freestone, see Russell Institute
