= Lynne Cossman =

Jeralynn Sittig Cossman, also known as Lynne Cossman, is the provost and vice chancellor for academic and student affairs at the University of Massachusetts Lowell. She previously served as the founding dean of UTSA's College for Health, Community and Policy. Prior to that appointment in 2020, she was professor and head of the Department of Sociology at West Virginia University and before that, Department Head and chair in the department of sociology at Mississippi State University in Starkville, Mississippi. Cossman was also a research fellow at the Social Science Research Center at Mississippi State University. She is the co-editor-in-chief of the peer-reviewed journal Population Research and Policy Review.

Cossman received her B.S., M.S., and Ph.D. from Florida State University. She has published a number of articles in major journals, including: American Journal of Public Health, Social Problems, AIDS Education and Prevention, Health and Place, The International Journal of Health Geographics, The Journal of Economic and Social Measurement, OMEGA: Journal of Death and Dying, Population Research and Policy Review, Sociological Inquiry, Sociological Spectrum, Journal of Criminal Justice
