= Amy Tsui =

American demographer (born 1949)

Amy Ong Tsui (born 1949) is an American demographer.

Due to the Chinese Civil War, Tsui's father emigrated to the United States to pursue doctoral studies in agricultural economics. Tsui was born in Pullman, Washington in 1949. The elder Tsui worked for the Food and Agriculture Organization and moved his family to Bangladesh and Thailand. The Tsui family later returned to the United States. Amy complted high school, attended Carlton College in Minnesota, transferred to the University of Hawaiʻi at Mānoa, completing a BA (1970) and MA (1972), and a PhD (1977) at the University of Chicago; Donald Bogue was her advisor).

Tsui remained on faculty at Chicago until 1982, before joining faculty at the University of North Carolina at Chapel Hill. From 2002 to 2013, Tsui was the director of Johns Hopkins University's Bill and Melinda Gates Institute for Population and Reproductive Health. While affiliated with Johns Hopkins, Tsui was elected a fellow of the American Association for the Advancement of Science in 2004 and served as president of the Population Association of America in 2017. She also collaborated with universities in various African countries in improving their own population and reproductive health departments. In the 2020 Performance Monitoring and Accountability Project, Tsui was a Senior Technical Advisor.

Early in her career, she and Bogue challenged the notion of the "population bomb," predicting that increasing contraceptive use would cause the global population to balance at 8 billion by 2050. In most recent years, Tsui has focused her research on the topic of women's reproductive activities, prenatal care, and contraceptive usage in various countries around the world.

== Awards ==
State of Illinois, House of Representatives, Certificate of Recognition, 1981

Center for Advanced Study in the Behavioral Sciences, Summer Fellow, 1980

Delta Omega (Public Health) Honor Society

Robert J. Lapham Award, Population Association of America, 1999

Bernard G. Greenberg Alumni Endowment Award, School of Public Health, University of North Carolina at Chapel Hill, 1999

Fellow, American Association for the Advancement of Science, 2004

Champion of Public Health, Tulane School of Public Health and Tropical Medicine, 2005

AMTRA Award, JHSPH, 2006-07

Golden Apple Award, JHSPH, 2009

Carl S. Schulz Lifetime Achievement Award, Population, Reproductive and Sexual Health Section, American Public Health Association, November 2010
