= Normative (disambiguation) =

Normative in academic disciplines means relating to an ideal standard or model, and in particular a normative statement (or norm see below) is a statement that affirms how things should or ought to be, that is how to value them.

Normative disciplines include:

- Normative economics, a branch of economics that incorporates value judgments
- Normative jurisprudence, a branch of legal theory,

and in philosophy, see:

- Normative ethics, a branch of philosophical ethics concerned with morality
- Norm (philosophy)

Normative may also refer to:

- Normative assessment, in education, a type of test or evaluation
- Normative mineralogy, a geochemical mineralogy calculation
- Normative grammar, grammar aimed at laying down grammatical norms

== See also ==
- Normative Aging Study
- Standardization, the process of developing and implementing technical standards sometimes called norms
