= Donald Bogue =

American sociologist and demographer (1918–2014)

Donald Joseph Bogue
- Born: 1918; Independence, Missouri
- Died: 2014 (aged 95–96); Dyer, Indiana
- Occupations: Sociologist and Demographer

Donald Joseph Bogue (1918–2014) was an American sociologist and demographer.

Bogue was born in Utah and raised on a farm near Independence, Missouri. He earned his bachelor's degree in sociology from the University of Iowa in 1939, and completed a master's degree in the same subject at Washington State College the following year. Between 1942 and 1946, Bogue was a statistician for the United States Navy. After World War II ended, Bogue authored the 1949 doctoral dissertation The Structure of the Metropolitan Community: A Study of Dominance and Subdominance under the direction of Amos Hawley at the University of Michigan.

Bogue began his research work in 1947, with the Scripps Foundation for Research in Population Problems at Miami University, then joined the University of Chicago in 1954, where he became a full professor in 1958 and remained for the rest of his career. He was elected a fellow of the American Statistical Association in 1956. Bogue was the president of the Population Association of America from 1963 to 1964, and founded the organization's flagship academic journal, Demography, serving as chief editor from 1964 to 1968.

Bogue was married to Elizabeth Mullen from 1944 to her death in 1973. He died in Dyer, Indiana, on 21 April 2014, aged 96. A collection of Bogue's papers is held at the University of Chicago Library.

== Selected publications ==
- Bogue, Donald J. (1985) [1959]. The Population of the United States. Free Press.
- Bogue, Donald J. (1963). Skid Row in American Cities. University of Chicago Press.
- Burgess, Ernest W.; Bogue, Donald J., eds. (1964). Contributions to Urban Sociology. University of Chicago Press.
- Bogue, Donald J., ed. (1967). Sociological Contributions to Family Planning Research. Community and Family Study Center, University of Chicago.
- Bogue, Donald J. (1969). Principles of Demography. John Wiley and Sons.
- Bogue, Donald J., ed. (1970). Further Sociological Contributions to Family Planning Research. Community and Family Study Center, University of Chicago.
- Bogue, Donald J.; Liegel, Gregory; Kozloski, Michael (2009). Immigration, Internal Migration, and Local Mobility in the U.S. Edward Elgar Publishing. ISBN 9781848444089.
