= Mildred Hall =

Mildred Hall may refer to:

- Mildred Hall (sociologist), maiden name of sociologist Mildred Blaxter
- Mildred Hall (teacher), first public school teacher at the Log School House in the Yellowknife, Northwest Territories, Canada
