= Mildred Blaxter =

British sociologist and writer

- Born: Mildred Lillington Hall; 27 March 1925; Jesmond, Newcastle-upon-Tyne, England
- Died: 29 August 2010 (aged 85); Weston-super-Mare, England
- Occupations: Signals officer of the Women's Royal Naval Service; University teacher
- Spouse: Kenneth Blaxter
- Children: 3

Academic background
- Education: St Anne's College, Oxford (MA); University of Aberdeen (MA)

Academic work
- Discipline: Sociologist
- Sub-discipline: Medical sociology
- Institutions: University of East Anglia; University of Cambridge

Mildred Lillington Blaxter (née Hall; 27 March 1925 – 29 August 2010) was a British sociologist and writer. An obituary in The Guardian described as a scholar who "shed new light on the causes of deprivation". She was a signals officer in the Women's Royal Naval Service during World War II. An author of Mothers and Daughters, she was a professor of medical sociology at the University of East Anglia, and then at the University of Cambridge.

== Early life and education ==
Blaxter was born Mildred Lillington Hall on 27 March 1925 in Jesmond, Newcastle-upon-Tyne, the elder child and only daughter of Robert Charlton Hall, a bank manager, and his wife, Mildred Violet Hall (née Gleed), an actress. As World War II broke out in 1939, her father, who she remembered as "actively anti-intellectual", had a deep "apocalyptic view of the War" and decided to send the children away. By that time, the British government had initiated a body called Children's Overseas Reception Board (CORB) which organised mass evacuation of British children to the safer Dominion countries and US.

Blaxter's father was a supporter of the project and said, "Oh, we will sacrifice ourselves, but we have to save the children." In 1939, she and her brother were sent to Canada to live with an aunt. They were fortunate as not all evacuations were successful – MS St Louis was denied docking in US and Canada such that the passengers later died in German concentration camps. And also their ship was the last to make a successful voyage under CORB as the next two ships were torpedoed by German U-boats in the Atlantic waters – in August 1940, SS Volendam was completely destroyed but the passengers were rescued, and in September 1940, SS City of Benares was sunk with most of its passengers killed. The CORB operation was terminated.

From spring 1941, the British government implemented conscription for women of over 17 years to join the war efforts. Blaxter returned to England in 1943 to work as a signals officer in the Women's Royal Naval Service. She boasted of sharing a cup of cocoa with General Dwight Eisenhower, Supreme Commander of the Allied Expeditionary Force. Stationed on the Sutor Point (Cromarty Firth), north of Inverness, she was involved in the preparations for the D-Day invasion. She was in a reconnaissance team that explored French coast, but she caught typhoid that led to her dismissal from the team, as she recalled in an interview, "[It] did not make me popular when they found it out!" After the war, she was eligible to apply for admission in a university under the government's special policy for ex-servicemen (90% of the seats were reserved for them) offered at the University of Oxford and Cambridge. In 1946, she entered St Anne's College, Oxford, and earned a master's degree in English in 1949. She was never officially discharged from the navy, for which she labelled herself as a permanent "deserter". At Oxford she was elected into the editorial board of the student newspaper, Isis, becoming the magazine's the first woman assistant editor.

At age 22, Blaxter married Kenneth Blaxter, a renowned animal nutritionist at the Hannah Dairy Research Institute in Ayr, Scotland, who was later knighted in 1977 (for which she would be later called Lady Baxter). Instead of continuing academic or journalistic profession, she chose to commit to her family as a mother and "dutiful wife" (as she put it). In 1965, her husband became director of the Rowett Research Institute in Aberdeen, where they lived until his retirement in 1982. Then she would call herself the "director's wife". She was in her 40s when she read Peter Townsend's study of old people's homes The Last Refuge, and decided to be a sociologist – a "second life" as she called it. She later explained: "I did it [being a mother and a wife] dutifully for a little while! And then decided I'd done enough, you know the children were all at school, and so I decided it was time to find a life of my own again. And by this time I decided I wanted to do sociology." She also added in an interview in 2006: "almost everything that has ever happened in my life has been due to some book or other!" In 1967, she enrolled at the newly established department of sociology at the University of Aberdeen, where she experienced generation issues with her teachers, as she described:

I was older than all of them, you know, I was in my forties by this time. And I had too much experience in the relevant areas, i.e. we're talking about the Health Service, 1946, and parenthood and politics and all sorts of things, you know, I had actual experience of these and they didn't. They were talking from theory. So they found me … and I had to be very careful to keep my mouth shut, and I wasn't always successful! I think they found me difficult, and I found them difficult.

She earned a master's degree in medical sociology in 1972.

== Career and contributions ==
Since her Oxford days as editor of Isis, Blaxter found journalism as a potential profession. As soon as she graduated in 1949, she worked for the Daily Express as a voluntary "dogsbody and messenger", soon after which he was employed by the London-based publisher George Newnes, with which she worked for eight years. While a student at Aberdeen, he met John Randall in 1970, who was Director of the Medical Research Council (MRC) Biophysics Unit at King's College London (where his scientists Rosalind Franklin and Maurice Wilkins had discovered the structure of DNA) and had just joined University of Aberdeen. An MRC Medical Sociology Unit was established in Aberdeen in 1965, and was in need of staff in its development. Randall invited Blaxter to join the unit as soon as she completed her degree.

In 1972, Blaxter was appointed scientific officer at the MRC Medical Sociology Unit. There she received a research grant for a project "Objectives and Needs in Medical and Social Care Systems" funded by the Social Science Research Council (later the Economic and Social Research Council). Working with Sally Macintyre (who would later become Director of the unit and Dame Commander of the Order of the British Empire in 2011), she studied the conditions of the disabled in health and social care systems. Her associates there were Raymond Illsley, Gordon Horobin, Phil Strong, and Alan Davies. Her findings were published in 1976, The Meaning of Disability.

In 1975, she became elected member of the Society for Research in Rehabilitation. Her 1982 book, Mothers and Daughters is considered "a classic" and her most influential work. The research carried out with Elizabeth Patterson, sociologist at the University of Aberdeen, was commissioned by the Department of Health and Social Security of the British government. It was an analysis of the health conditions among women prior to the creation of the NHS in 1948 and their daughters, which Blaxter had originally investigated and published in a small book, The Health of the Children, in 1981.

In 1982, when her husband retired, she joined the University of East Anglia, rising to professor of medical sociology in 2000, and later became senior sociologist at the University of Cambridge. Between 1987 and 1992, she was director of the programme "Behavioural Aspects of AIDS" under the Economic and Social Research Council. In 1987, she became the lead editor of the journal Sociology of Health and Illness, continuing till 1994. From 1991, the journal instituted the SHI Mildred Blaxter New Writer's Prize, annual award given to best articles. In 1990, Blaxter published Health and Lifestyles.

In 1995, Macintyre, then editor-in-chief of the journal Social Science & Medicine, invited her to join her as a senior editor, the task she performed till 2006. In 2001, she was designated chair of the working group on the guidelines of behavioural change under the National Institute for Health and Care Excellence. In 2003, he was appointed honorary professor at the University of Bristol and at East Anglia, the positions she retained till her death. Her last book came out in 2004, Health: Key Concepts (its second edition in 2010). From 2007 till her death, she was book reviews editor for Sociology of Health and Illness. For her works on social health conditions, Jennie Popay in The Guardian obituary described as a scholar who "shed new light on the causes of deprivation".

== Personal life ==
On 12 October 1957, she married Kenneth Blaxter (1919–1991) and had three children. The eldest child, Alison, became a lecturer at Bristol Veterinary School (University of Bristol). The middle child, Mark, became a zoologist at the University of Edinburgh and then at the Wellcome Sanger Institute as Leader of the Darwin Tree of Life (DToL) and Chair of Earth BioGenome Project.

=== Death ===
Blaxter died of lung cancer on 29 August 2010 at Weston Hospicecare, Uphill, Weston-super-Mare.

== Legacy ==
Baxter summarised her ideas on health issues in an article "Class, time and biography" (published in a book Health, Medicine and Society in 2003) in which she introduced a concept called "health capital". She further elaborated in her last book, Health. According to the concept, health is gained or lost through constant experiences and resources, and such variations are influenced by social positions. The concept has inspired many scholars to analyse health issues in different social contexts and occupations.

The Foundation for the Sociology of Health and Illness, which owns Sociology of Health and Illness, instituted the "Mildred Blaxter postdoctoral fellowships" for PhD scholars working in the field of social health.

== Books ==
- The Meaning of Disability (1976)
- Mothers and Daughters (1972)
- Health and Lifestyles (1990)
- Health: Key Concepts (2004)
