= Mothers & Daughters =

Mothers & Daughters may refer to:

- Mothers and Daughters (book), a book by Prof. Mildred Blaxter and Elizabeth Patterson
- Mothers and Daughters (comics), a four-volume graphic novel by Dave Sim featuring Cerebus the Aardvark
- Mothers and Daughters (2016 film), a 2016 comedy film
- Mothers & Daughters (2008 film), a Canadian comedy-drama film
- Mothers & Daughters (2004 film), a 2004 independent film directed by Hannah Davis and David Conolly
- Mothers & Daughters (album), a 1997 studio album by Rosemary Clooney
- Mothers and Daughters, an 1831 novel by Catherine Gore

== See also ==
- Daughters-Mothers, a 1974 Soviet drama film
- Mother's Daughter (disambiguation)
