= Mark D. Hayward =

American demographer and sociologist

Mark D. Hayward is an American demographer and sociologist.

Hayward completed his bachelor's degree in sociology at the Washington State University in 1975, then pursued a master's (1978) and doctorate (1981) in the same subject at Indiana University Bloomington. He taught at the University of Southern California and Pennsylvania State University before moving to the University of Texas at Austin in 2005, where he holds the Centennial Commission Professorship in Liberal Arts #1.

Hayward became a honored member of the Population Association of America in 2019. He is a former chief editor of the academic journal Demography.
