= Archana Singh-Manoux =

Research professor

Archana Singh-Manoux is a research professor and director at the French Institute of Health and Medical Research (INSERM), Université de Paris, Paris, France, and an honorary professor at the Institute of Epidemiology & Health, Faculty of Population Health Science at the University College London (UCL), London, UK.

== Research career ==
Singh-Manoux is interested in studying cognitive and motor function decline with age, with a special interest in socioeconomic factors leading to neurodegenerative diseases like dementia. She has obtained six research grants from the British Heart Foundation, National Institute on Aging and Medical Research Council. She has written book chapters and her research work is often mentioned in news articles. According to Scopus, Archana Singh-Manoux has authored 365 research articles with 17024 citations and an h-index of 73, even though Google reports much higher numbers.

== Awards ==
- 2018: Prix Coups d'élan, Fondation Bettencourt Schueller.
- 2015: Prix Recherche Inserm.
- 2010: Member, Academia Europaea, The Academy of Europe.
- 2005: Chair of Excellence Award: French Ministry of Research.

== Most cited peer-reviewed publications ==
- Mika Kivimäki, Solja T Nyberg, G David Batty, Eleonor I Fransson, Katriina Heikkilä, Lars Alfredsson, Jakob B Bjorner, Marianne Borritz, Hermann Burr, Annalisa Casini, Els Clays, Dirk De Bacquer, Nico Dragano, Jane E Ferrie, Goedele A Geuskens, Marcel Goldberg, Mark Hamer, Wendela E Hooftman, Irene L Houtman, Matti Joensuu, Markus Jokela, France Kittel, Anders Knutsson, Markku Koskenvuo, Aki Koskinen, Anne Kouvonen, Meena Kumari, Ida EH Madsen, Michael G Marmot, Martin L Nielsen, Maria Nordin, Tuula Oksanen, Jaana Pentti, Reiner Rugulies, Paula Salo, Johannes Siegrist, Archana Singh-Manoux, Sakari B Suominen, Ari Väänänen, Jussi Vahtera, Marianna Virtanen, Peter JM Westerholm, Hugo Westerlund, Marie Zins, Andrew Steptoe, Töres Theorell, IPD-Work Consortium. Job strain as a risk factor for coronary heart disease: a collaborative meta-analysis of individual participant data. The Lancet 380 (9852), 1491-1497. (Cited 1013 times, according to Google Scholar)
- A Singh-Manoux, NE Adler, MG Marmot. Subjective social status: its determinants and its association with measures of ill-health in the Whitehall II study. Social Science & Medicine 56 (6), 1321-1333. (Cited 966 times, according to Google Scholar.)
- Stringhini S, Sabia S, Shipley M, Brunner E, Nabi H, Kivimaki M, Singh-Manoux A. Association of socioeconomic position with health behaviors and mortality. Jama. 2010 Mar 24;303(12):1159-66. (Cited 840 times, according to Google Scholar.)
- Singh-Manoux A, Marmot MG, Adler NE. Does subjective social status predict health and change in health status better than objective status?. Psychosomatic medicine. 2005 Nov 1;67(6):855-61. (Cited 999 times, according to Google Scholar.)
- Singh-Manoux A, Kivimaki M, Glymour MM, Elbaz A, Berr C, Ebmeier KP, Ferrie JE, Dugravot A. Timing of onset of cognitive decline: results from Whitehall II prospective cohort study. BMJ. 2012 Jan 5;344. (Cited 743 times, according to Google Scholar.)
