= Kenneth Blaxter =

Kenneth Blaxter may refer to:

- Kenneth Blaxter (animal nutritionist) (1919–1991), British animal nutritionist
- Kenneth William Blaxter (1896–1964), British civil servant
