= Mark Blaxter =

British zoologist and geneticist

- Born: Aberdeen, Scotland
- Education: London School of Hygiene and Tropical Medicine (PhD)
- Known for: Head of the Darwin Tree of Life; Chair of Earth BioGenome Project
- Scientific career
- Workplaces: University of Edinburgh; Wellcome Sanger Institute

Mark Lyon Blaxter is a British zoologist known for his works on genome sequencing of animals, particularly of worms. Important species he had sequenced include Brugia malayi (human roundworm), different species of Caenorhabditis (roundworms), Globodera rostochiensis (parasite of potato), Heligmosomoides polygyrus (roundworm of rodents), Lumbricus terrestris (earthworm), Meloidogyne incognita (parasitic worm of plants), and Ostertagia ostertagi (roundworm of cattle).

Blaxter was a professor of zoology at the University of Edinburgh until he moved to the Wellcome Sanger Institute. Since 2018, he is designated Leader of the Darwin Tree of Life (DToL), a scientific research project established to sequence the genomes of all eukaryotes in Britain and Ireland. In 2025, he became elected Chair of Earth BioGenome Project, the global project for the same research on eukaryotes.

== Early life and education ==
Blaxter was born in Aberdeen, Scotland, to Sir Kenneth Lyon Blaxter (1919–1991) and Mildred Blaxter (1925–2010). His father was a noted animal nutritionist and Fellow of the Royal Society, while his mother was an author and professor of sociology. His middle name "Lyon" came from his grandmother's family, among which Mary F. Lyon (1925– 2014), his father's first cousin, became famous for the discovery of lyonisation, the process of X-chromosome inactivation. He has a sister Alison, a lecturer at Bristol Veterinary School (University of Bristol), and a brother Piers.

Growing up in a biologically-influenced family, Blaxter was determined to become a biologist since childhood. Apart from their house in Aberdeen, his family also had one in the Scottish Highlands where they had many animals including the wild ones. As he recalled the place, he said: "We grew up with lots of furry animals all over the place; my sister was obsessed with goats and my brother dogs. But I was never really into them. I was more into small wiggly things." From his early school days, he was a self-professed "bookworm" and his favourite was Classification of the Animal Kingdom by Amadeus William Grabau (1870-1946) that he noted as a "really nerdy" book from his father's collection, and Grzimek's Animal Life Encyclopedia that he used to read from a local library. In his school there was only one biology teacher, who he described as "horribly overworked", and biology course was reserved for aspirants in medicine and veterinary science. Focussed on mainstream biology, he was denied joining the course. Teaming up with five friends, he formed a biology club which manually took up biology by using the school laboratory to study specimens they collected from ponds, the system of which he remembers as "generally annoying the poor biology teacher." He also had an inclination towards geology and palaeontology when he found a fossil of fish skin in Orkney when he was ten years of age.

At age 17, Blaxter entered the University of Aberdeen. At the time, a special admission scheme was provided by the university for the local community even for low-grade students. During his second year, he had an opportunity to join a formal course in zoology under the Department of Biology of the University of Edinburgh. After graduation, he worked as a community arts worker in Belfast for six months, and another six months as an environmentalist in South India. He enrolled for a PhD course at St Mary's Hospital Medical School in London where his research involved cystic fibrosis – a genetic disorder involving respiratory and digestive problems. Due to a conflict with the research leader, he left after a year and a half, when he found a PhD position at the London School of Hygiene and Tropical Medicine. Under John Kelly (as his main supervisor) and Michael Miles, he earned his doctorate on the biology and DNA sequencing of Leishmania donovani, a parasitic protozoan that causes a deadly disease, kala azar (visceral leishmaniasis). During his doctoral course he attended a parasitolgists' meeting which reignited his fascination for "wiggly things" by learning roundworms. This led to his research on helminths as his major contributions to science.

== Career ==
Blaxter took up post-doctoral research at Imperial College London, under Murray Selkirk, where he worked on Brugia malayi, a roundworm that causes elephantiasis (lymphatic filariasis). There he came across an information on Caenorhabditis elegans, a free-living worm that became a widely used model animal in research at the time. He approached the experts at the University of Cambridge, Jonathan Hodgkin (who did a PhD on the genetics of the worm) and John Sulston (who studied the worm's nervous system and later sequenced the whole genome, for which he received 2002 Nobel Prize in Physiology or Medicine). He started to work on the genetics of C. elegans, and in 1990 he received a fellowship from the Wellcome Trust for the research.

In 1995, Blaxter was appointed postdoctoral fellow at the Institute of Cell, Animal, & Population Biology of the University of Edinburgh. His research then covered genetics and genome sequencing of many roundworms, protists and other animals. In 2004, he became a full professor as Personal Chair of Evolutionary Genomics. He, among other scientists, became an advocate of genome sequencing of all eukaryotes on Earth to understand the diversity of life and evolutionary relationships between different species. Collaborating with Harris Lewin from the University of California, Davis, US, he initiated a global project called Earth BioGenome Project for sequencing the genomes of all eukaryotes. The project was launched on 1 November 2018 in London, alongside a sister project, the Darwin Tree of Life (DToL), which focusses on eukaryotes present in UK and Ireland. In 2019, he moved to the Wellcome Sanger Institute as Leader of DToL. In 2025, he was elected to the Chair of Earth BioGenome Project, replacing Lewin.

== Personal life ==
Blaxter is a avid reader of scientific literature, novels and poems. He called himself a bookworm, saying, "I'm omnivorous, I drink books." He is also a poet and stone collector by hobby. He has two children.

== Honours ==
In 2014, Blaxter was elected Fellow of the Royal Society of Edinburgh under the section Organismal and Environmental Biology. He is also fellows of the Linnaean Society of London, the Helminthological Society of Washington, and the Royal Society of Biology.
