= Social epidemiology =

Field of study

While epidemiology is "the real study of the distribution and determinants of states of health in populations", social epidemiology is "that branch of epidemiology concerned with the way that social structures, institutions, and relationships influence health," according to Lisa Berkman and Ichiro Kawachi. This research includes "both specific features of, and pathways by which, societal conditions affect health".

Although health research is often organized by disease categories or organ systems, theoretical development in social epidemiology is typically organized around factors that influence health (i.e., health determinants rather than health outcomes). Many social factors are thought to be relevant for a wide range of health domains. Social epidemiology can therefore address any health outcome, including chronic disease, infectious disease, mental health, and clinical outcomes or disease prognosis. Exposures of interest to social epidemiologists include individual-level measures (e.g., poverty, education, social isolation), contextual factors (e.g., residential segregation or income inequality), and social policies (e.g., policies that create income security or promote educational access). Analyses that address the independent or synergistic effects of individual or contextual risk factors are often of interest. Understanding the origins of health disparities and identifying strategies to eliminate health disparities is a major focus of social epidemiology.

Major research challenges in social epidemiology include tools to strengthen causal inference, methods to test theories of illness such as fundamental cause theory, translation of evidence to systems and policy changes that will improve population health, and mostly obscure causal mechanisms between exposures and outcomes. To address obscurity of causal mechanisms in social epidemiology, it has been proposed to integrate molecular pathological epidemiology into social epidemiology.

For example, questions of interest to epidemiologists include:

- Why have racial and economic inequalities in premature mortality persisted for generations, even as the specific diseases causing premature death have completely changed?
- Do changes in social policies regulating social safety nets, human capital development, employment, occupational conditions, housing, or residential segregation influence the health of individuals?
- Do social conditions at specific periods of life, for example, early life developmental periods, disproportionately influence later health outcomes compared to exposures at later ages?
- Do adverse experiences such as chronic psychological stress, trauma, racism, or shame influence health, and if so, what are the biological mechanisms of these effects?

Social epidemiology draws on methodologies and theoretical frameworks from many disciplines, and research overlaps with several social science fields, most notably economics, medical anthropology, medical sociology, health psychology, and medical geography, as well as many domains of epidemiology. However, intersecting social science fields often use health and disease in order to explain specifically social phenomenon (such as the growth of lay health advocacy movements), while social epidemiologists generally use social concepts to explain patterns of health in the population.

More recently, the discipline is moving from identifying health inequalities along the social gradient to identifying the policies, programmes, and interventions that effectively tackle the observed socioeconomic inequalities in health. Researchers Frank Pega and Ichiro Kawachi from Harvard University have suggested that this may lead to the new discipline of political epidemiology, which is more policy-oriented, identifying effective and cost-effective social interventions for government action to improve health equity.
