= Mother's Daughter =

Mother's Daughter may refer to:

- "Mother's Daughter", a song by Gregg Rolie, featured on the 1970 album Abraxas by Santana
- "Mother's Daughter", a 2003 episode of the Canadian television series Miracles
- "Mother's Daughter", a collaborative music project from American musicians Jessie Standafer and Alexa Wilkinson
- "Mother's Daughter" (song), a 2019 song by American singer Miley Cyrus
- Mother's Daughter and Other Songs, a 2005 album by English folk band Tunng
- This Mother's Daughter, a 1976 album by American singer Nancy Wilson

== See also ==
- Mothers & Daughters (disambiguation)
