= Sonalde Desai =

Sociologist and demographer

- Education: University of Bombay (BA); Case Western Reserve University (MA); Stanford University (PhD)
- Scientific career
- Fields: Sociology and demography
- Workplaces: University of Maryland, College Park (1994-)

Sonalde Desai is a sociologist and demographer. She is a Distinguished University Professor of Sociology at the University of Maryland, College Park and a professor at the National Council of Applied Economic Research, where she serves as the first direction of the National Data Innovation Centre. She is the principal investigator for the India Human Development Survey, a nationwide panel data survey or more than 40,000 households in more than 2,000 villages and urban neighborhoods. In 2022, she served as president of the Population Association of America. In 2023 she was named a fellow of the American Association for the Advancement of Science.

Desai's research concerns social inequality in developing countries, especially with regard to gender and class. Her research on women's education and employment in India, and its implications for child health and development, has been especially influential. Much of her research concerns gender and development in India. She also writes frequently on topics related to population and inequality for publications such as The Indian Express and The Hindu.

Early life and education

Desai was born in India and grew up in Gujarat and Mumbai. She received her bachelor's degree from the University of Mumbai. She earned a master's degree in sociology from Case Western Reserve University, and a doctorate in sociology from Stanford.

Career

Desai joined the University of Maryland College Park in 1994 as a senior assistant professor of sociology and a member of the Center on Population, Gender, and Inequality.

In 2021, she became a distinguished professor in sociology at the University of Maryland, and president of the Population Association of America in 2022. In 2025 she was awarded the Harriet B. Presser Award from the Population Association of America.

In 2022, the Indian Ministry of Rural Development appointed Desai to a committee for studying the performance of states in carrying out the National Rural Employment Guarantee Scheme, a set of labor and social security programs and regulations for addressing poverty.

Desai frequently contributes opinion articles for The Indian Express and The Hindu.

Research

While at RAND in 1989, Desai and colleagues published a study on the impact of mothers’ employment on the cognitive abilities of their children at the age of four. The study found that there was a statistically significant adverse effect on male children from higher income families, and especially if mothers were employed during the sons’ infant years; the negative impact of maternal absence, however, was mitigated by mothers’ reduced fertility, and offset by the positive effects of increased income.

In 1998, Desai published a cross-national study that reexamined the established observation that, on average, the more education mothers have, the healthier their children tend to be. The study found that the correlation between education level and health becomes weaker when taking into account local circumstances such as family's access to running water, toilets, and vaccines.

To assess the effectiveness of India's program of affirmation action on reducing the caste system's legacy of inequality, in 2008, Desai and a colleague compared education achievement across groups within India. Using large-scale survey data spanning 20 years, they found that designated scheduled castes saw improved completion of primary school. They also found that inequality in higher education attainment persisted, and that Muslims (a group that did not receive affirmative action) remained worse off educationally than most other disadvantaged groups.

In 2020, Desai and colleagues published a study examining education hypogamy (marrying a person with less education) among women in India. Using data from the India Human Development Survey, they showed that among women, education hypergamy was declining while educational hypogamy was rising. The reason hypogamy was rising was because educated women tended to marry men with lower education status but higher familial and economic status.
