= David Gilford Armstrong =

British biochemist and expert in animal nutrition

David Gilford Armstrong FRSE FRIC FIB (1926–2000) was a British biochemist and expert in animal nutrition.

== Biography ==
He was born in Whitley Bay on 9 July 1926, the son of Arthur Armstong (d. 1930), a bank clerk. He was educated at Whitley Bay Grammar School. He then studied agricultural chemistry at King's College, Durham graduating BSc in 1946 and then gained an MSc before gaining a doctorate (PhD) in 1951. He then became a lecturer at the Newcastle University, spending a year lecturing at the University of Illinois working with H. H. Mitchell.

Returning to the UK he was placed on the staff of the Hannah Dairy Research Institute in Ayrshire joining their Nutrition Department in 1954, working with Kenneth Blaxter FRS replacing Blaxter as Head of department in 1963.

He left the institute in 1967 to return to Newcastle University, first as a Reader in Agricultural Biochemistry, rising to Professor in 1968, remaining in that role until 1991. He was awarded the Sir John Hammond Memorial Prize in 1968.

In 1969, he was elected a Fellow of the Royal Society of Edinburgh. His proposers were Sir David Cuthbertson, Robert Garry, Malcolm M. Cooper, Alexander Milne, Thomas Stanley Westoll and William Andrew Clark.

In 1987, he won both the Hoffman La Roche Prize for Animal Nutrition and the Italian Society of Zootechnia Uovo D'Oro award. In 1988 he was awarded an honorary doctorate from the University of Louvain-la-Neuve in Belgium and the Massey Ferguson Award for Contribution to the Agricultural Industry in UK. In 1990 he won the National Dairy Science Award and from the American Dairy Science Association.

He was on the governing committee of: the Hill Farming Research Organisation in Edinburgh; the Macaulay Land Use Research Institute in Aberdeen; the Grassland Research Institute at Hurley; and the Institute of Animal Health at Compton. He was a member of the Agricultural Research Institute and the Meat and Livestock Commission.

He died suddenly, at his home in Ponteland near Newcastle-upon-Tyne on 8 February 2000.

He married Sarah Hannah, granddaughter of the founder of the Hannah Dairy Research Institute.
