= Sara R. Curran =

American sociologist

Sara R. Curran is an American sociologist.

Curran earned a bachelor's degree in natural resources management from the University of Michigan in 1983, where she also minor in economics. In 1990, she earned a master's of science degree in sociology and again minored in economics at North Carolina State University. Curran completed a doctorate in sociology at the University of North Carolina at Chapel Hill in 1994.

Curran began her teaching career in 1996 at Princeton University, then joined the University of Washington faculty in 2005. She became chief editor of the academic journal Demography in 2022.

== Selected books ==
- Perecman, Ellen; Curran, Sara R. (2006). A Handbook for Social Science Field Research: Essays & Bibliographic Sources on Research Design and Methods. SAGE Publications. ISBN 9781412916813.
