= Kenneth Blaxter (animal nutritionist) =

British animal nutritionist (1919–1991)

Sir Kenneth Lyon Blaxter
- Born: 19 June 1919; Sprowston, England
- Died: 18 April 1991 (aged 71)
- Occupations: Agriculturalist, biologist, researcher
- Years active: 1948–1991
- Known for: directing the Rowett Research Institute
- Spouse: Mildred Blaxter

Sir Kenneth Lyon Blaxter FRS PRSE FIBiol (19 June 1919 – 18 April 1991) was an English animal nutritionist.

== Biography ==
=== Early life ===
Blaxter was born on 19 June 1919 in Sprowston, England and grew up in Norfolk. His father made handicrafts and his mother came from a family of farm workers. Blaxter studied at the City of Norwich School until 1936. He was bored in school and received poor grades. As a teenager, Blaxter spent his spare time at the Norfolk Agricultural Station, a short distance from the family home. Soon after, he enrolled in day classes in agriculture at the Norfolk County Council, winning the class prize for the highest mark. He also worked as a farmhand on a farm in Hoveton.

Blaxter studied agriculture, biology and botany at the University of Reading in 1936, graduating in 1939.

=== Nutrition research ===
After graduating, Blaxter worked at the National Institute for Research in Dairying (NIRD), located in Shinfield. With the onset of World War II, Blaxter was conscripted and served with the 10th Field Regiment of the Royal Artillery from spring 1940 to the end of 1941, when he returned to NIRD. At this time, he began to write his Ph.D thesis, entitled The maintenance of the winter milk supply in wartime; he completed the thesis in 1944. Shortly thereafter, he requested to be seconded to the biochemistry department of the Ministry of Agriculture in Weybridge, where he conducted blood analysis and researched lead toxicity in ruminants. In 1946, Blaxter moved to Illinois to work with animal nutritionist Harold Mitchell at the University of Illinois.

=== Work as an independent scientist ===
In 1947, after returning to England, Blaxter applied for the headship of the Nutrition Department at the Hannah Dairy Research Institute in Ayr, Scotland and received the position in 1948. During his tenure at the Hannah Dairy Research Institute, Blaxter wrote over 200 papers, focusing primarily on the issues of energy metabolism and feed usage by ruminants. Blaxter also investigated nutritional diseases and magnesium deficiency in calves, the effect of temperature and other environmental effects on sheep, and ruminant digestion and feed intake. From 1954 he was assisted by Dr David Gilford Armstrong.

In 1965, Blaxter was appointed director of the Rowett Research Institute in Aberdeen, Scotland. There, Blaxter and his team of researchers studied topics of importance to the Scottish farmer, including deer farming, llamas, human nutrition, feed evaluation, environmental stress and animal calorimetry. He also took an interest in agriculture and worldwide food policy, culminating in the publication of a book, Food, People and Resources, in 1986.

=== Retirement ===
Blaxter retired from the Rowett Research Institute in 1982. From 1985 to 1991, Blaxter was a visiting professor in the University of Newcastle upon Tyne's Department of Agricultural Biochemistry and Nutrition. He also chaired a committee of the federal Department of the Environment and the Cabinet Committee on Individual Merit Promotion, a body that recognized and awarded candidates from various scientific fields. He died on 18 April 1991 of a brain tumour.

== Honours and awards ==
Blaxter was named a Fellow of the Royal Society in 1967 and was knighted in 1977.

From 1972 to 1975, he served as vice-president of the Royal Society of Edinburgh, and acted as its president from 1979 to 1982. He also served a three-year term in the 1980s as President of the Institute of Biology.

In 1979, he received the Wolf Prize in Agriculture for his research into the nutritional requirements of ruminants.

In 1992, he was posthumously awarded the Rank Prize in Nutrition for his lifetime contributions to nutrition science.

Blaxter was also the recipient of honorary doctorates from Queen's University in Belfast, the Agricultural University in Norway, the University of Leeds, the University of Aberdeen and the University of Newcastle.

== Personal life ==
Blaxter married sociologist Mildred Hall in 1957; they had three children together. The eldest child, Alison, became a lecturer at Bristol Veterinary School (University of Bristol). The middle child, Mark, became a zoologist at the University of Edinburgh and then at the Wellcome Sanger Institute as Leader of the Darwin Tree of Life (DToL) and Chair of Earth BioGenome Project. Blaxter's cousin was Mary Lyon, the well-known British geneticist. Blaxter was also an avid amateur painter.

== Legacy ==
Blaxter was influential in the fields of animal and human nutrition and animal husbandry. In Blaxter's memory, the British Society of Animal Science grants an annual scholarship, entitled the Kenneth Blaxter Award, to a deserving member of the Society in order to pursue short-term research in the animal sciences.

== Bibliography ==
- The maintenance of the winter milk supply in wartime, Ph.D thesis (1944)
- Food, People and Resources (1986)
- Energy Metabolism in Animals and Man (1988)
- The Post-war Revolution in Food Production (1989)
