= Lisa Berkman =

American epidemiologist

- Born: 1950 (age 75–76); New York

Lisa Berkman is an American epidemiologist currently the Thomas D. Cabot Professor of Public Policy, Epidemiology, and Global Health at Harvard T.H. Chan School of Public Health.

== Education ==
Berkman received her B.A. degree in sociology from Northwestern University in 1972. After that she did M.S in epidemiology from University of California, Berkeley. In 1977, she completed her Ph.D. from the same university.

== Career ==
Since 2017, Berkman has been serving as a director of Harvard Center for Population and Development Studies and professor of Global Health and Population at the Harvard T.H. Chan School of Public Health Prior to becoming director of the HCPDS, Dr. Lisa Berkman headed the Department of Society, Human Development and Health at the Harvard T.H. Chan School of Public Health (1995 - 2008) and was former head of the division of chronic disease epidemiology at Yale University (1979–1995). She is the President-Elect of Population Association of America 2022 and Member of Deaton Report on Inequality in the UK. Berkman presently serves as a member of The French Institute for Public Health Research (IReSP). She worked as the Robert Wood Johnson Foundation Health & Society Scholars program's co-site director from 2002 to 2016.

== Bibliography ==
- Health and Ways of Living: The Alameda County Study with Lester Breslow(Oxford University Press.), 1983
- Social Epidemiology with Ichiro Kawachi(Oxford University Press), 2000
- Neighborhoods and Health with Ichiro Kawachi (Oxford University Press), 2003
