= Mothers and Daughters (book) =

Book by Prof. Mildred Blaxter and Elizabeth Patterson

Mothers and Daughters: A Three-Generational Study of Health Attitudes and Behaviour is a book by Prof. Mildred Blaxter and Elizabeth Patterson based on Blaxter's study "Mothers and Daughters: Accounts of Health in the Grandmother Generation, 1945–1978".

The study is concerned with grandmother-daughter relationships, especially in regard to medical advice, or more generally beliefs and attitudes to health and medical care from an intergenerational perspective. Between 1977 and 1978, 46 grandmothers were interviewed about their own health and the health of their family members, answering detailed questions on topics such as episodes of illness, health services, accidents, nutrition or dental care.

Most of the data has been digitalized and it can be obtained, together with additional study information, from the Economic and Social Data Service (ESDS) website. The original study included both interviews from grandmothers and daughters. However, this collection only provides the grandmother interviews.

== Bibliography ==
Blaxter, Mildred and Patterson, Elizabeth (1982) Mothers and Daughters: A Three-Generational Study of Health Attitudes and Behaviour, London: Heinemann Educational Books
