= Kenneth William Blaxter =

Kenneth William Blaxter CMG (1 September 1895 - 3 April 1964) was a British civil servant, Assistant Secretary to the Colonial Office from 1942 to 1956.
