= Ichiro Kawachi =

Epidemiologist

MD–PhD Ichiro Kawachi
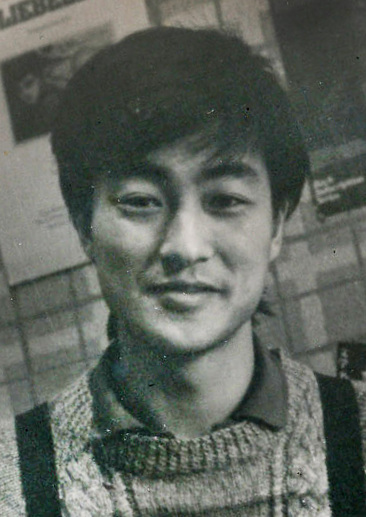
- As a student, in Wellington, in 1983
- Born: Tokyo, Japan
- Citizenship: the United States
- Education: University of Otago
- Occupation: Social epidemiologist
- Website: Staff profile

Ichiro Kawachi (河内一郎, Kawachi Ichirō) is a social epidemiologist of Japanese origin who was trained in New Zealand. He is currently the John L. Loeb and Frances Lehman Loeb Professor of Social Epidemiology at the Harvard T.H. Chan School of Public Health where he is also the chair of the Department of Social and Behavioral Sciences.

Along with S.V. Subramanian, he is the co-editor-in-chief of the international journal Social Science & Medicine and the sister open access journal SSM – Population Health. In 2018, Kawachi was elected an Honorary Fellow of the Royal Society of New Zealand. He is also an elected member of the Institute of Medicine of the US National Academy of Sciences.

Kawachi attended Otago Boy's High School, and gained his medical degree and Ph.D. in epidemiology from the University of Otago, New Zealand. He has taught at Harvard since 1992.

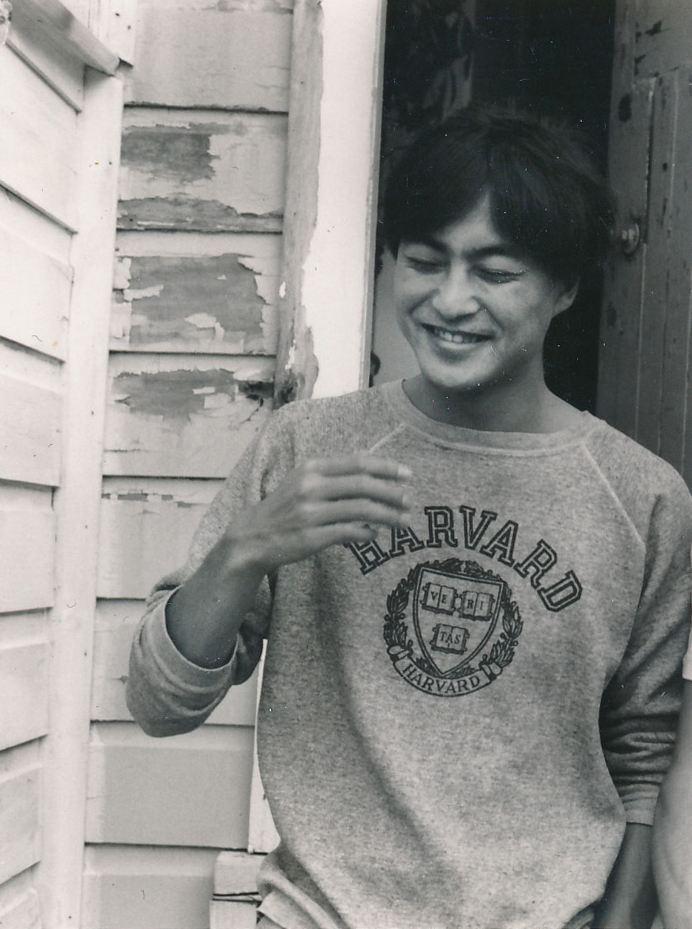
Ichiro Kawachi in his early twenties, outside his student flat in Wellington, New Zealand

== Publications ==
- Income Inequality and Health: A Reader. New York: The New Press. 1999. ISBN 1565845714
- Is Inequality Bad for Our Health? Boston: Beacon Press. 2000. ISBN 0807004472
- Social Epidemiology. New York: Oxford University Press. 2000. ISBN 0199395330
- The Health of Nations. New York: The New Press, 2002. ISBN 9781565845824
- Neighborhoods and Health New York: Oxford University Press. 2003. ISBN 0190843500
- Globalization and Health. New York: Oxford University Press. 2006. ISBN 019517299X
- Social Capital and Health. New York: Springer. 2008. ISBN 0387713107
- Behavioral Economics and Public Health, edited with Christina Roberto: Oxford University Press. 2016. ISBN 019939833X
- Social Epidemiology of Sleep, edited with Dustin Duncan & Susan Redline, Oxford University Press. 2019. ISBN 9780190930431
- The Oxford Handbook of Public Health Practice, edited with Iain Lang, and Walter Ricciardi. Oxford University Press. 4th edition. 2020. ISBN 9780198800125
