= Southern Demographic Association =

Academic society

- Abbreviation: SDA
- Formation: 1970
- Type: Non-profit academic society
- Region served: North America
- Official language: English
- President: Joseph Lariscy (2025)
- Publication: Population Research and Policy Review
- Website: sda-demography.org

The Southern Demographic Association (SDA) is a non-profit scientific professional association dedicated to the study of issues related to population and demography. Since 1982, its official journal is Population Research and Policy Review. The organization holds an annual meeting in the Southern United States.

The organization was founded in 1970 in Oak Ridge, Tennessee.

== See also ==
- Population Association of America
