= Normative Aging Study =

Long-term study of the health effects of aging

The Normative Aging Study (NAS) is a longitudinal study which studies the effects of aging on various health issues. The ongoing study was established in 1963 by the United States Department of Veterans Affairs. The initial sample was 2,280 men now with an average age of 72 years (mean age at entry was 42 years). Most participants are veterans from World War II and the Korean War.

Participants in the study have undergone medical examinations every three to five years, also answering questions about behaviors affecting health.

Among the topics researchers have used the NAS for are stress, smoking, and cardiac health.

One of the findings based on the study was that subjective stress appeared to be a better prediction of mortality than the objective evaluation of stressful events.
