= Sally Macintyre =

British sociologist (born 1949)

Dame Sally Macintyre DBE FRSE FMedSci
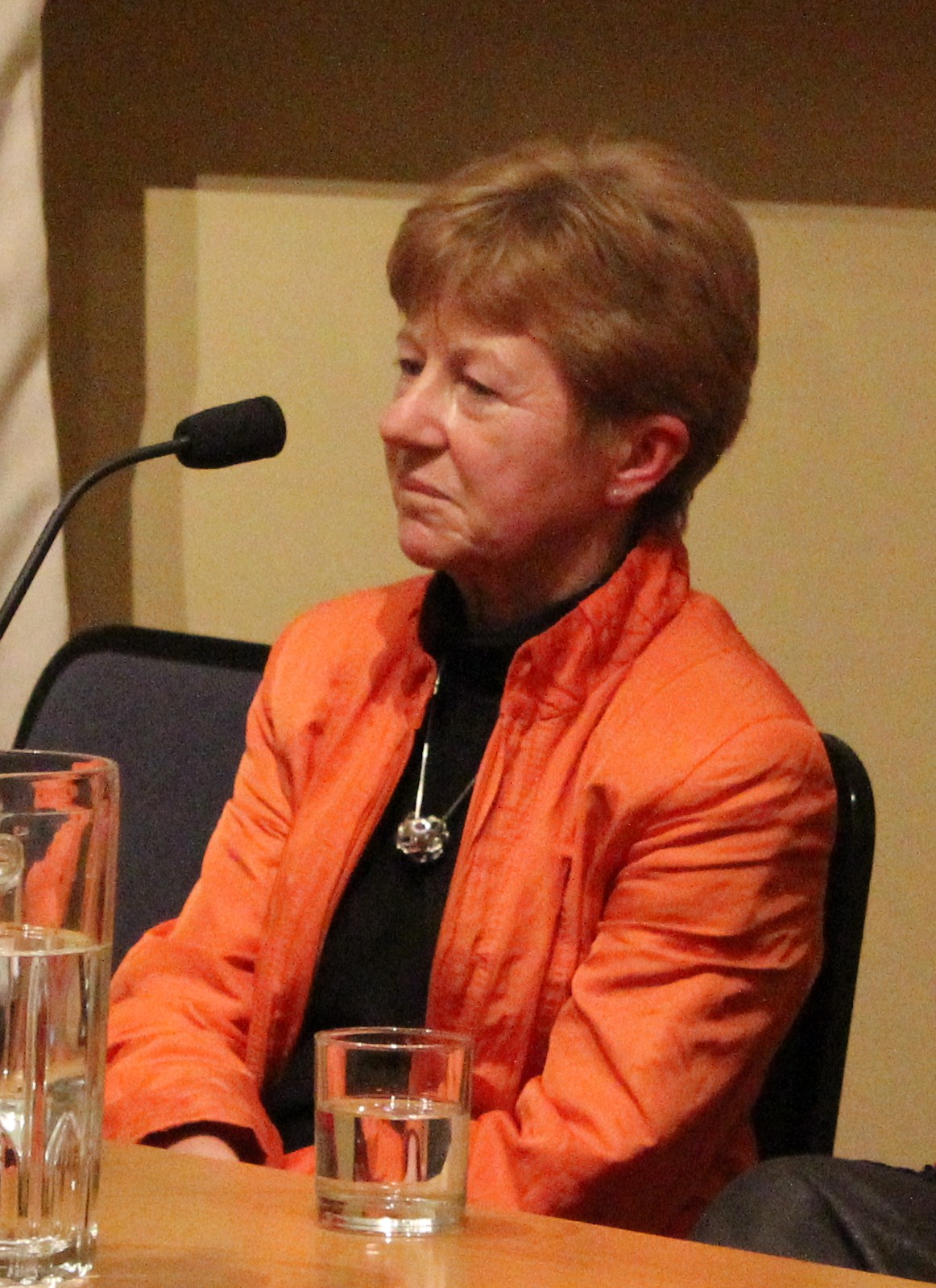
- Macintyre in 2013
- Born: Sarah Jane Macintyre; 1949 (age 76–77); Edinburgh, UK
- Spouse: Guy Muhlemann (m. 1980)

Academic background
- Education: Durham University; Bedford College, London; University of Aberdeen
- Thesis: Decision-Making Processes Following Pre-Marital Conception (1976)

Academic work
- Discipline: Sociology
- Sub-discipline: Medical sociology
- Institutions: University of Aberdeen; University of Glasgow

Dame Sarah Jane Macintyre DBE FRSE FMedSci (born 1949), known as Sally Macintyre, is a British medical sociologist. She is a professor emerita (formerly professor of social and public health sciences) at the University of Glasgow.

In 1998 she was appointed an OBE for services to medical sociology, and in 2006 she was advanced to CBE for services to social science. In 2011 she was further promoted to DBE for services to science. In 2013 she was one of 12 women to receive the inaugural 'Engineering and Physical Sciences' Suffrage Science award.

== Background and education ==
Sarah Jane Macintyre was born in Edinburgh, Scotland. Her father, Angus Macintyre, was the then rector of St James's Scottish Episcopal Church, Leith. Her mother, Evelyn Macintyre, had trained as a nurse and midwife in Oxford before the war. When she was 2, the family moved to Trinity College, Glenalmond in Perthshire (now Glenalmond College) where her father was chaplain until 1967.

Macintyre was schooled at home until the age of 10, when she went to Morrison's Academy, Crieff, for two years. From the ages of 12–16 she went to the Nesta Brooking School of Ballet in London, where she undertook classical ballet training. Having not reached the required height to join a classical ballet company, she went to Chichester College of Further Education to obtain university entrance qualifications.

Macintyre read social theory and administration at the University of Durham, as a member of St Aidan's College, graduating in 1970. She then did an MSc in sociology as applied to medicine at Bedford College, London, and was awarded a distinction in this degree in 1971. She undertook a part-time PhD while working as a research fellow at the University of Aberdeen, on the topic of decision-making processes following premarital conception, the degree being awarded in 1976.

== Career ==
In 1971 Macintyre went to a research post at the Centre for Social Studies, University of Aberdeen. From 1975 she was employed at the Medical Research Council (MRC) Medical Sociology Unit in Aberdeen. She was appointed director of the MRC Medical Sociology Unit in 1983, and moved it to the University of Glasgow in 1984. In 1998 she took on the directorship of the Chief Scientist Office-funded Public Health Research Unit, which merged with the MRC Medical Sociology Unit to become the MRC/CSO Social and Public Health Sciences Unit. She retired from the directorship in 2013, and was succeeded by Laurence Moore.

From 2011 until 2014, Macintyre was also director of the Research Institute for Health and Wellbeing at the University of Glasgow. She was a member of the council of the UK Medical Research Council from 2008 to 2016. In 2014, she chaired the UK Economic and Social Research Council's working group on the social science agenda for combatting anti-microbial resistance. Between 2014 and 2016, she co-chaired the expert advisory group advising the Chief Medical Officers of the UK about revised alcohol consumption guidelines.

She was the inaugural chair of the scientific advisory board of the UK Prevention Research Partnership, from 2016 to 2019. In this period, she was also a member of the Human Tissue Authority and of the UK Biobank's Ethics and Governance Council. She was appointed as the inaugural chair of the Nuffield Council on Bioethics governing board in 2017.

== Research interests and contributions ==
Macintyre's research was initially in the area of sociological aspects of reproduction and of maternity care. She demonstrated that many of what were thought to be natural aspects of motherhood were actually highly socially constructed and culturally variable. In the 1980s she took a role in the evaluation of a trial of a new pattern of antenatal care in Aberdeen (involving more delegation to midwives and general practitioners, and fewer scheduled antenatal visits. Involvement in that evaluation, which was a non-randomised trial, triggered her continued interest in evidence-based health care and health and social policy, and how to evaluate effectiveness and cost-effectiveness.

Her research interests then moved into the broad field of inequalities in health. Her major contribution has been to further the understanding of socioeconomic, spatial and gender inequalities in health across time and over the life course, using data from individuals, households and areas to improve understanding of the significance of the social and physical environment for health.

Macintyre has also applied her sociological understandings to a range of emerging contemporary issues, such as HIV and AIDS, the development of 'the new genetics', and food choices, scares and representations of health risks in the media.

She is an advocate for robust approaches and methods for evaluating public health policies and interventions, and in doing so has contributed to guidelines for the evaluation of public health policies.

== Fellowships and awards ==
Macintyre was elected Fellow of the Royal Society of Edinburgh in 1998, and a Fellow of the Academy of Medical Sciences in the same year. In 2003, she was made an honorary fellow of the London School of Hygiene & Tropical Medicine.

She has honorary Doctorates of Science from the University of Aberdeen (2006), University College London (2012) and Lancaster University (2013). From 1995 to 2004 she was editor-in-chief of the international journal Social Science & Medicine.

In 1994 she was president of the Sociology and Social Policy Section of the British Association for the Advancement of Science, and in 2001 was president of its Medical Sciences Section. She was chair of the Society for Social Medicine in 2005. She was inaugural chair of the MRC's Population Health Sciences Research Network from 2005 to 2009.

== Personal life ==
Macintyre is a hill walker, climber, mountaineer and skier. In 1978 she was moderator (president) of the Aberdeen Mountaineering Club, and in 1986 she became a member of the Pinnacle Club, a rock climbing club for women. She joined the Ladies Scottish Climbing Club in 2023. She completed her Munros (the 282 peaks over 3,000-foot high in Scotland) in 2002. She has participated in several expeditions in the Karakoram range in Pakistan, including one all-woman expedition which completed two first ascents of 6000 m peaks.
