= Darwin Tree of Life =

- Project type: Scientific research
- Funding agency: Wellcome Trust
- Objective: Genome sequencing of eukaryotes
- Location: UK, Ireland
- Project coordinator: Mark Blaxter
- Participants: Earlham Institute; European Bioinformatics Institute; Marine Biological Association; Natural History Museum, London; Royal Botanic Gardens, Kew; Royal Botanic Garden Edinburgh; University of Cambridge; University of Edinburgh; University of Oxford; Wellcome Sanger Institute
- Duration: 1 November 2018 – 2028
- Website: www.darwintreeoflife.org

The Darwin Tree of Life (DToL) is a scientific research project established to sequence the genomes of all eukaryotes in Britain and Ireland. Launched in 2018, the project is led by the Wellcome Sanger Institute and funded by the Wellcome Trust. It is a collaboration of universities, museums, and research institutes to produce high-quality genome sequences that are accessible to everyone and will be useful for understanding biodiversity, agricultural values and diseases. It is part of the global Earth BioGenome Project that aims to sequence and catalog the genomes of all eukaryotes on Earth.

== Background ==
In 1837, Charles Darwin made a branching line diagram which he labelled "I think" as a hypothesis of species relationship. In his Origin of Species (1859), he made another line drawing for an evolutionary network and common ancestry of different species that he called the "Tree of Life." In 1866, Ernst Haeckel made a literal tree diagram in his book Generalle Morphologie ("General Morphology") depicting evolution of life from bacteria (he called moneres) to different branches of protists, plants and animals. As evidence and understanding of evolutionary theories grew, the concept of the tree of life became a major goal of modern biology. With the development of genome sequencing methods in the 21st century, it became possible to construct the actual patterns of the tree of life.

By 2018, about 1.5 million species of eukaryotes have been recorded that include protists, plants, fungi and animals. The genomes of many eukaryotic species had been fully sequenced ranging from the roundworm, Caenorhabditis elegans, the first multicellular organism to be sequenced in 1998, malarial parasite, Plasmodium falciparum, the first protist sequenced in 2002, to humans with the sequencing completed in 2022. Depending on the quality and completeness of the sequence, and the number of species added to the completion record, the eukaryotic tree of life kept on changing in the branching details, and thus, a comprehensive data and species are required for an accurate picture.

== The project ==
The Darwin Tree of Life was launched in London, England, on 1 November 2018, as part of the global Earth BioGenome Project that plans to sequence all eukaryotic genomes. The Darwin Tree of Life will target eukaryotic species documented in UK and Ireland, about 70,000 species. The project is led by Mark Blaxter at the Wellcome Sanger Institute, and the European Bioinformatics Institute will be responsible for recording the genome sequences and make them accessible. In addition to the two organisations, participating institutions include:

- Earlham Institute
- Marine Biological Association
- Natural History Museum, London
- Royal Botanic Gardens, Kew
- Royal Botanic Garden Edinburgh
- University of Cambridge
- University of Edinburgh
- University of Oxford

The project is funded by the Wellcome Trust, a charitable foundation based in London, with the initial budget of £100 million with the total of £600 million for completion. The complete sequencing of all the target species is expected by 2028.

=== Concept ===
In 2021, the Darwin Tree of Life Project Consortium explained the concept behind the project in the Proceedings of the National Academy of Sciences with a statement:

The need for understanding [of all species] is critical, as climate change, globalization of trade, and the degradation of agricultural and natural habitats drive the sixth mass extinction, and with it the productivity on which humans depend. The looming need to establish postoil economies and the promise of new feedstocks for bioindustry demand deeper exploration of the biosphere. We need novel medicines to combat emerging and resurgent diseases, and the natural pharmacopoeia has much to offer in the form of novel compounds. Openly accessible understanding of species' biology is a global good.

According to Blaxter and his colleagues, the project will be an accomplishment on Charles Darwin's theory of evolution: "Elucidation of the processes of evolution and speciation since Darwin's The Origin of Species [that] demonstrates the interconnectedness of all life.
