= Population Association of America =

Academic society

- Abbreviation: PAA
- Formation: 1930
- Type: Non-profit academic society
- Headquarters: Alexandria, Virginia
- Region served: North America
- Official language: English
- President: Irma T. Elo (2025)
- Publication: Demography
- Staff: 5
- Website: populationassociation.org

The Population Association of America (PAA) is a non-profit scientific professional association dedicated to the study of issues related to population and demography. The PAA was established by Henry Pratt Fairchild and Frederick Osborn, with funds secured by Margaret Sanger from the Milbank Memorial Fund. In its early years, the PAA was a coalition of population scientists, birth control activists, immigration restrictionists, and eugenicists.

== History ==
=== Founding ===
The Population Association of America was conceived on December 15, 1930 at a meeting in the office of Henry Pratt Fairchild at New York University. It was an offshoot of the American National Committee of the International Union for the Scientific Study of Population (IUSSP) which had been formed in 1927 with Raymond Pearl of Johns Hopkins University as its first President. The History Committee identifies the following events in the timeline prior to the founding of PAA that were relevant to founding PAA:

- 1922: Scripps sets up the Scripps Foundation for Research in Population Problems. This would later be renamed the Scripps Gerontology Center in 1972.
- 1927: The World Population Conference is held in Geneva, leading to the formation of the International Union for the Scientific Study of Population (IUSSP).
- 1928: Milbank Memorial Fund begins studies in population in New York City.
- 1929: Guy Burch founds the Population Reference Bureau in New York City.
- December 15, 1930: A small group begins to discuss forming the PAA in New York City Town Hall.
- May 7, 1931: The PAA is organized in New York City Town Hall.
- April 22–23, 1932: The PAA holds its first annual meeting in New York City Town Hall.
- 1935: Eleanor Roosevelt, wife of then-U.S. President Franklin Roosevelt, attends the PAA's Conference on Population Studies in Relation to Social Planning. Frank Lorimer produces the first issue of Population Index using office space at Victor Building, which at the time also hosted the Population Reference Bureau.

== Journal ==
The flagship journal of the PAA, called Demography, is a bi-monthly open access journal published by Duke University Press and was founded in 1964. It is one of the world's leading journals on issues related to population and demographic trends.

== Award ==
The Irene B. Taeuber Award for research achievements of the Population Association of America is named after Irene Barnes Taeuber.

PAA awards 8 different awards.

== Conferences ==
The PAA holds an annual meeting every spring where people present research and data on population trends.

The PAA held its first annual meeting on April 22–23, 1932, in New York City. Since then, annual meetings have been held every year except the year 1938 and the years 1943, 1944, and 1945 (the latter three due to the United States' involvement in World War II). Initially, PAA Annual Meetings were held in New York City and nearby East Coast cities, due to the concentration of population researchers and policymakers in that area. The first meeting outside the eastern U.S. time zone was held in Chicago in 1958. Since then, conferences have been held in numerous locations across the United States ranging from Dallas and Miami to Minneapolis, and also in some cities in Canada such as Montreal and Toronto.

The annual meeting website is maintained in collaboration with Princeton University. The Pew Research Center is among the many demography-related research groups that sends many papers and posters to this conference. Some of the PAA's Annual Meetings and additional meetings have been held in collaboration with other professional associations such as the American Statistical Association (1933, 1950), American Philosophical Society (1938), National Economic and Social Planning Association (1939), and American Sociology Association (1967). The Annual Meeting for 2020 was canceled, and the 2021 meeting was held virtually.

The PAA has also sponsored other population-related conferences, such as the 1935 Conference on Population Estimates that Eleanor Roosevelt attended and the 2013 conference Integrating Genetics and the Social Sciences held at the University of Colorado.

== Presidents ==
Recent presidents were

2024 – Jennifer Glass
2023 – Lisa Berkman
2022 – Sonalde Desai
2021 – Robert A. Hummer
2020 – Eileen M. Crimmins
2019 – John Casterline
2018 – Wendy Manning
2017 – Amy Tsui
2016 – Judith A. Seltzer
2015 – Steven Ruggles
2014 – Robert Moffitt
2013 – Christine A. Bachrach

== Membership ==
PAA allows people to become members for a fee depending on their status and location. Members get PAA publications including the journal Demography, weekly e-newsletter, and they can attend the PAA Annual Meeting at a reduced rate. As of 2013, there were about 3,000 members.

== Other activities ==
The PAA is a partner in the Science and Technology Fellowship Program of the American Association for the Advancement of Science.

== See also ==
- Population Reference Bureau
- Max Planck Institute for Demographic Research
- Institut national d'études démographiques
- Southern Demographic Association
