= Population Research and Policy Review =

- Discipline: Demography
- Language: English
- Edited by: Kara Joyner, David Warner

Publication details
- History: Since 1982
- Publisher: Springer Science+Business Media
- Frequency: Bimonthly
- Open access: Hybrid
- Impact factor: 2.6 (2024)

Standard abbreviations
- ISO 4: Popul. Res. Policy Rev.

Indexing
- CODEN: PRPRE8
- ISSN: 0167-5923
- OCLC no.: 525604060

Links
- Journal homepage; Online archive

Population Research and Policy Review is a bimonthly peer-reviewed academic journal covering demography. It was established in 1982 and is published by Springer Science+Business Media on behalf of the Southern Demographic Association, of which it is the official journal. The editors-in-chief are David Warner (University of Alabama at Birmingham) and Susan Stewart (Iowa State University). According to the Journal Citation Reports, the journal has a 2024 impact factor of 2.6.
