= Social Science & Medicine =

- Discipline: Social sciences, health science
- Language: English
- Edited by: Susan J. Elliott

Publication details
- History: 1967–present
- Publisher: Elsevier
- Frequency: Biweekly
- Open access: Hybrid
- Impact factor: 5.4 (2022)

Standard abbreviations
- ISO 4: Soc. Sci. Med.

Indexing
- ISSN: 0277-9536
- LCCN: 82643975
- OCLC no.: 609900358

Links
- Journal homepage; Online archive

Social Science & Medicine is a peer-reviewed academic journal covering social science research that is relevant to health. The disciplines covered by the journal include anthropology, economics, geography, psychology, social epidemiology, social policy, sociology, medicine, and health care practice, policy, and organization. The journal was established in 1967 and is published by Elsevier.

== History ==
Social Science & Medicine (ISSN 0037-7856) was published quarterly from 1967 to 1977 by Pergamon Press and was then split into:

- Social Science & Medicine. Part A: Medical Psychology & Medical Sociology (ISSN 0271-7123)
- Social Science & Medicine. Part B: Medical Anthropology (ISSN 0160-7987)
- Social Science & Medicine. Part C: Medical Economics (ISSN 0160-7995)
- Social Science & Medicine. Part D: Medical Geography (ISSN 0160-8002)
- Social Science & Medicine. Part E: Medical Psychology (ISSN 0271-5384)
- Social Science & Medicine. Part F: Medical & Social Ethics (ISSN 0271-5392)

In 1982, Parts A-F were merged back into one journal. It was published by Pergamon Press, until that company was acquired by Elsevier in 1992.

Since 2015, several partner journals with specific thematic focuses have been established.

- SSM - Qualitative Research in Health (ISSN 2667-3215)
- SSM - Population Health (ISSN 2352-8273)
- SSM - Mental Health (ISSN 2666-5603)
- SSM - Health Systems (ISSN 2949-8562)
- Wellbeing, Space and Society (ISSN 2666-5581)

== Editor-in-Chief ==
- 2023 to Present – Susan J. Elliott, Department of Geography and Environmental Management, University of Waterloo, Canada.
- 2012 to 2023 – Ichiro Kawachi and S.V. Subramanian, both at Harvard T.H. Chan School of Public Health.
- 2004 to 2012 – Ellen Annandale, Department of Sociology, University of York, UK.
- 1995 to 2004 – Sally Macintyre, MRC / CSO Social and Public Health Sciences Unit, University of Glasgow, UK.
- 1967 to 1995 – Peter J. M. McEwan (Founding Editor).

== Abstracting and indexing ==
The journal is abstracted and indexed in:

- ASSIA
- Abstracts on Hygiene and Communicable Diseases
- BIOSIS Previews
- CINAHL
- Current Contents/Health Services Administration
- Current Contents/Social & Behavioral Sciences
- EMBASE
- Elsevier BIOBASE
- Geographical Abstracts
- MEDLINE
- PASCAL
- Psychology Abstracts
- Scopus
- Social Sciences Citation Index
- Sociological Abstracts
- Tropical Diseases Bulletin

According to the Journal Citation Reports, the journal has a 2021 impact factor of 5.379.

== See also ==
- Occupational health psychology
