= Demography (journal) =

- Discipline: Demography
- Language: English
- Edited by: Sara R. Curran

Publication details
- History: 1964–present
- Publisher: Duke University Press on behalf of the Population Association of America (United States)
- Frequency: Bimonthly
- Open access: Yes
- Impact factor: 3.984 (2020)

Standard abbreviations
- ISO 4: Demography

Indexing
- ISSN: 0070-3370 (print); 1533-7790 (web)
- LCCN: 64009434
- JSTOR: 00703370
- OCLC no.: 1566147

Links
- Journal homepage

Demography is a peer-reviewed academic journal covering issues related to population and demography. It is the flagship journal of the Population Association of America and has been published by Duke University Press since 2021. Demography was formerly published by Springer. The editor is Sara R. Curran (University of Washington).

== History ==
The journal was established in 1964. The publication has become more frequent in recent years:

- 1964–1965: Published once a year
- 1966–1968: Published twice a year
- 1969–2012: Published four times a year (with the exception of 2010, where there were five issues, one of which was a special supplement)
- 2013–present: Published six times a year

== Publication model ==
Older issues of the journal are available via JSTOR and Project MUSE.

While published by Springer, Demography was a hybrid open access journal, charging subscription fees for access while offering authors the option of making their work available open access by paying an article processing charge.

The journal was fully converted to diamond open access in 2021 when Duke University Press became its publisher. It relies on a community partnership model, in which libraries, research centers, academic departments, and other entities voluntarily contribute funds to cover publication costs. Demography no longer assesses article processing charges.

Articles are published under a Creative Commons license (BY-NC-ND). Authors retain copyright over their works.

== Impact and reception ==
Demography is a leading journal on issues related to population and demographic trends and research published in Demography has been cited in The New York Times. According to the Journal Citation Reports, the journal has a 2020 impact factor of 3.984.
