= Neopaganism in Minnesota =

Regional religious movement

Minnesota's Twin Cities region is home to a large community of Wiccans, Witches, Druids, Heathens, and a number of Pagan organizations. Some neopagans refer to the area as "Paganistan". In the Handbook of Contemporary Paganism, Murphy Pizza characterizes the Minnesota Pagan community as "eclectic" and comprising "many different groups - Druid orders, Witch covens, legal Pagan churches, ethnic reconstructionist groups, and many more solitaries, interlopers and poly-affiliated Pagans".

== History ==
In 1961, Llewellyn Worldwide, an independent publisher of books for the New Age, Pagan, and occult audience was moved to Saint Paul by the new owner Carl L. Weschcke. At the time they were simply an astrological publisher. Llewellyn is "one of the country's oldest and largest independent publishers of Pagan books."

In 1963, Carleton College in nearby Northfield, Minnesota established a rule that students had to attend religious services of some kind. The RDNA (Reformed Druids of North America) formed in response and they continued to meet even after the rule was rescinded.

In 1971, Llewellyn hosted the "First American Aquarian Festival of Astrology and the Occult Sciences" which went on to be known as Gnosticon. Llewellyn's publications and Gnosticon drew more attention to Witchcraft, contemporary Paganism, and their connection to the Twin Cities. This led to the creation of the American Council of Witches in late 1973.

In 1975, Burtrand and Aura, initiates of the Weschckes via Lady Sheba, founded the Minnesota Church of Wicca.

In 1987 the Druid group called "Keltria" was formed when Tony Taylor initiated a schism from Isaac Bonewits' ADF.

In 1994, the Omphalos Pagan Community Center estimated that there are between 3,000 and 10,000 Pagans in Minnesota, "one of the largest concentrations in the country."

During the fight for Pagan veterans' rights against the Veterans Administration, a nationally-publicized rally and ritual took place at the Minnesota State Capitol Mall on February 24, 2007. The rally and ritual were organized by the Upper Midwest Pagan Alliance.

The Sacred Paths Center, which opened March 13, 2009, was at the time the only full-time non-profit Pagan community center in the United States. It closed its doors in early 2012, amid allegations of financial malfeasance. The Upper Midwest Pagan Alliance, formed to fight for Pagan civil rights during the "pentacle quest," adopted a stretch of highway in 2008 which Pagan volunteers kept clean.

On April 9, 2011 the Star Tribune reported that "the Twin Cities metro area -- dubbed "Paganistan" by Wiccans for having one of the highest witch concentrations in the country—has an estimated 20,000 witches who meet in 236 different covens or groups..." in an article about a Wiccan prisoner suing the State for his religious freedom.

In 2020, the Asatru Folk Assembly opened a Baldurshof in Murdock, a heathen hof dedicated to the god Baldur.

The Minnesotan Pagan community is the subject of a thesis by Doctor of Anthropology Murphy Pizza.

== See also ==
- Neopaganism in the United States
- Minneapolis – Saint Paul
