= 1980 in the environment =

This is a list of notable events relating to the environment in 1980. They relate to environmental law, conservation, environmentalism and environmental issues.

== Events ==
- The Global 2000 Report to the President is commissioned by US President Jimmy Carter.
- William R. Catton Jr. publishes Overshoot: The Ecological Basis of Revolutionary Change.
- President Carter signs the Low Level Radioactive Waste Policy Act of 1980
- A decade of "chronic sand mining" at Vigie Beach, Saint Lucia worsened the effects of hurricanes and made "coastal resources management development" more difficult; the Beach was so badly "effect[ed] by human interference" that "the bay was dredged in 1980 to rebuild the beach."

=== January ===
- Joy Adamson, a conservationist best known for her work with Elsa the lioness, was murdered in Africa. She wrote the book Born Free which was made into a film of the same name.

=== May ===
- On May 18, Mount St. Helens erupted violently. It takes decades for the area to undergo succession.

=== October ===
- The Forest Conservation Act, 1980 goes into force on 25 October 1980.

=== December ===
- The National Parks Act 1980 is passed in New Zealand.
- On December 2, 1980, US President Jimmy Carter signed the Alaska National Interest Lands Conservation Act, which provided varying degrees of special protection to over 157,000,000 acres of land in Alaska.
- US President Jimmy Carter signed the Comprehensive Environmental Response, Compensation, and Liability Act, also known as the "Superfund" law, for the investigation and cleaning up of sites contaminated with hazardous substances.

=== Undated ===
- The Praslin Power Station is commissioned and installed in Seychelles.

== See also ==
- Human impact on the environment
- List of environmental issues
- List of years in the environment
