= Deaths in October 1982 =

The following is a list of notable deaths in October 1982.

Entries for each day are listed alphabetically by surname. A typical entry lists information in the following sequence:

- Name, age, country of citizenship at birth, subsequent country of citizenship (if applicable), reason for notability, cause of death (if known), and reference.

== October 1982 ==
=== 2 ===
- Muktananda, 74, Indian yoga guru, religious writer, autobiographer, and alleged serial rapist, he was the founder of Siddha Yoga

=== 3 ===
- Vivien Merchant, 53, English actress, alcoholism-related death
- Noel Sickles, 72, American commercial illustrator and cartoonist, primarily known for his work on the comic strip Scorchy Smith, he received the Inkpot Award in 1976

=== 4 ===
- Ahmed Hassan al-Bakr, 68, Iraqi military officer and politician, leading member of the revolutionary Arab Socialist Ba'ath Party and the Arab Socialist Ba'ath Party – Iraq Region, he served as both the prime minister of Iraq and the president of Iraq from 1968 until 1979, brought to power by the 17 July Revolution, death due to unreported causes
- The Amazing Criswell, 75, American self-proclaimed psychic, published writer, newspaper columnist, television showman, and part-time actor, known for wildly inaccurate predictions of global catastrophe scenarios and for advocating a social cycle theory of history repeating itself
- Glenn Gould, 50, Canadian classical pianist, television producer, writer, broadcaster, and composer, taken off life support by decision of his father. Gould was hospitalized since late September due to a stroke which had paralyzed the left side of his body, and then suffered further brain damage.
- Leroy Grumman, 87, American aeronautical engineer, test pilot, and industrialist, he co-founded the company Grumman Aircraft Engineering Co. in 1929
- Stefanos Stefanopoulos, 84, Greek politician, he served as the prime minister of Greece from 1965 until 1966, during the political and constitutional crisis known as the Iouliana ("July events"), he had previously briefly served as the acting prime minister in October 1955, following the death in office of Alexandros Papagos, death due to heart disease and respiratory disease

=== 6 ===
- Philip Green, 71, British film and television composer, conductor, pianist, and accordion player, he rose to fame in the 1930s for his Radio Luxembourg programmes, he co-wrote the United Kingdom's 1963 Eurovision Song Contest entry, "Say Wonderful Things"cerebral metastasis

=== 8 ===
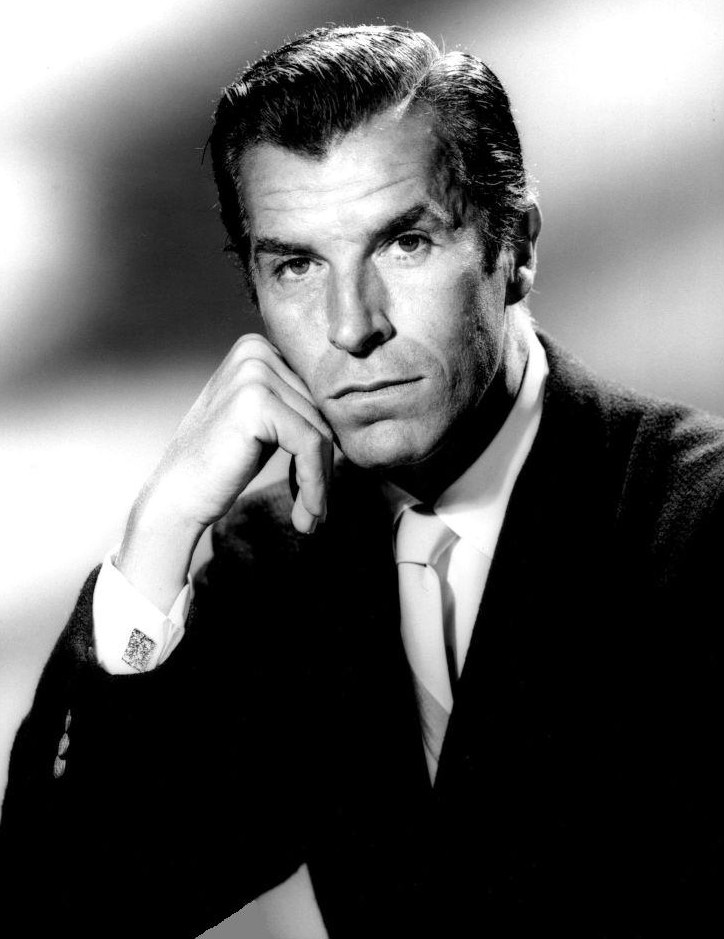
Fernando Lamas

- Fernando Lamas, 67, Argentine-American actor and director of the Golden Age of Argentine cinema, pancreatic cancer
- Philip Noel-Baker, 92, British politician, diplomat, academic, athlete, and renowned campaigner for disarmament, he is the only person to have won both an Olympic medal and a Nobel Prize,Member of Parliament (UK) for the Labour Party from 1929 until 1931, and again from 1936 until 1970, he became a life peer in 1977

=== 9 ===
- Anna Freud, 86, British psychoanalyst, considered the co-founder of psychoanalytic child psychology.

=== 10 ===
- Jean Effel, 74, French painter, caricaturist, illustrator, and journalist, he received the Lenin Peace Prize in 1967

=== 12 ===
- Phyllis Crane, 68, Canadian-born American actress, she frequently played supporting roles in the early films of The Three Stooges,esophageal cancer
- Howard Sackler, 52, American screenwriter and playwright, primarily known for the play The Great White Hope and its film adaptation, he also provided an uncredited rewrite for the script of the film Jaws (1975) and he was a main screenwriter for the sequel Jaws 2, found dead in his studio in Ibiza, Spain, the cause of death was unclear

=== 14 ===
- Virginia Fox, c.76-83 (Note: The year of her birth is unknown as birth records in West Virginia were not mandated until 1917. Different sources provide various estimates for her birth year), American actress of the silent film era, death due to a lung infection, complicated by emphysema.

=== 16 ===
- Mario Del Monaco, 67, Italian operatic tenor
- Paolo Heusch, 58, Italian film director and screenwriter
- Rory McEwen, 50, Scottish musician, minimalist painter, and sculptor,rail suicide

=== 18 ===
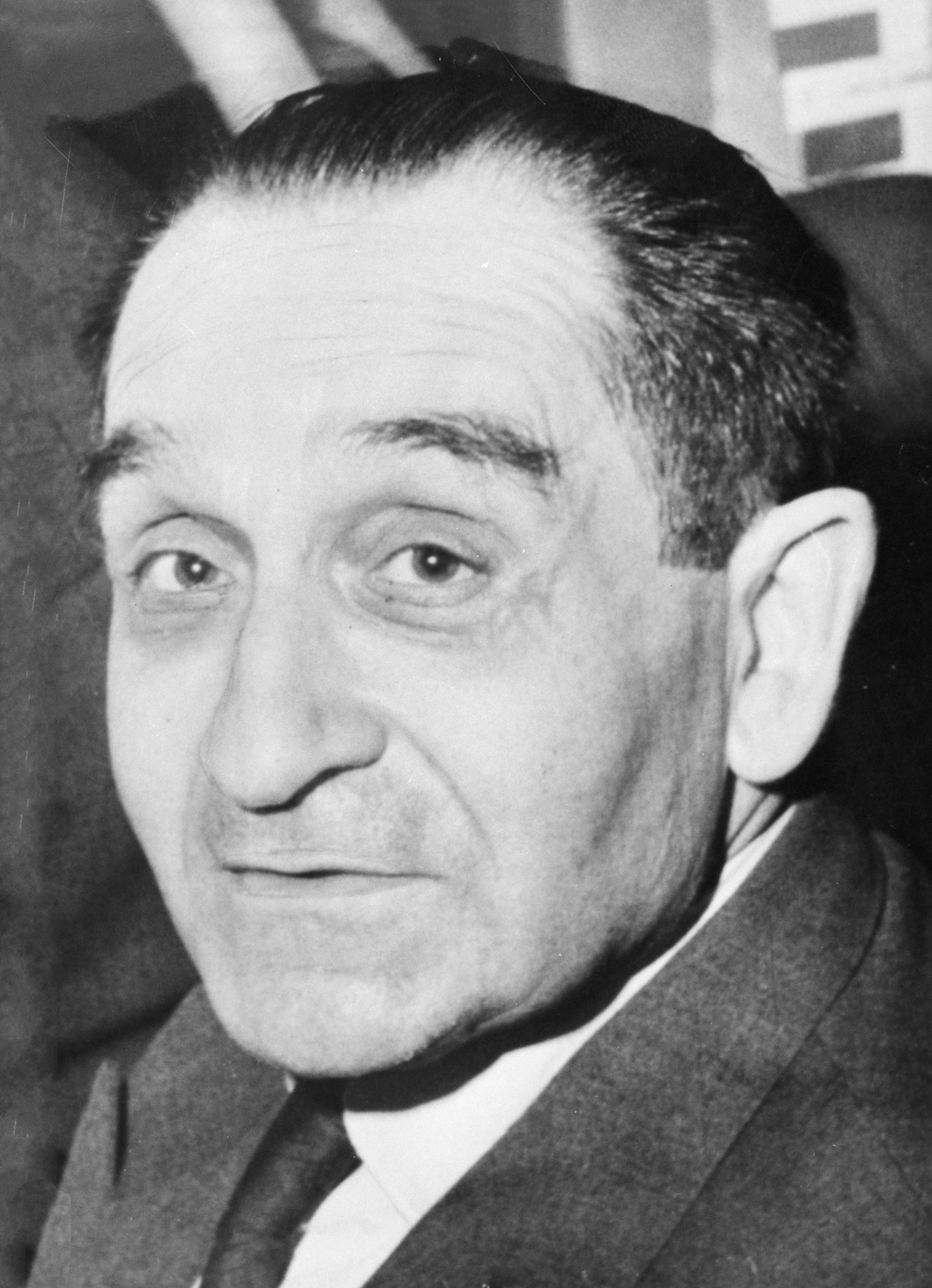
Pierre Mendès France

- Dwain Esper, 88, American film director and producer, known primarily for exploitation films, he is regarded as the founding father of modern exploitation

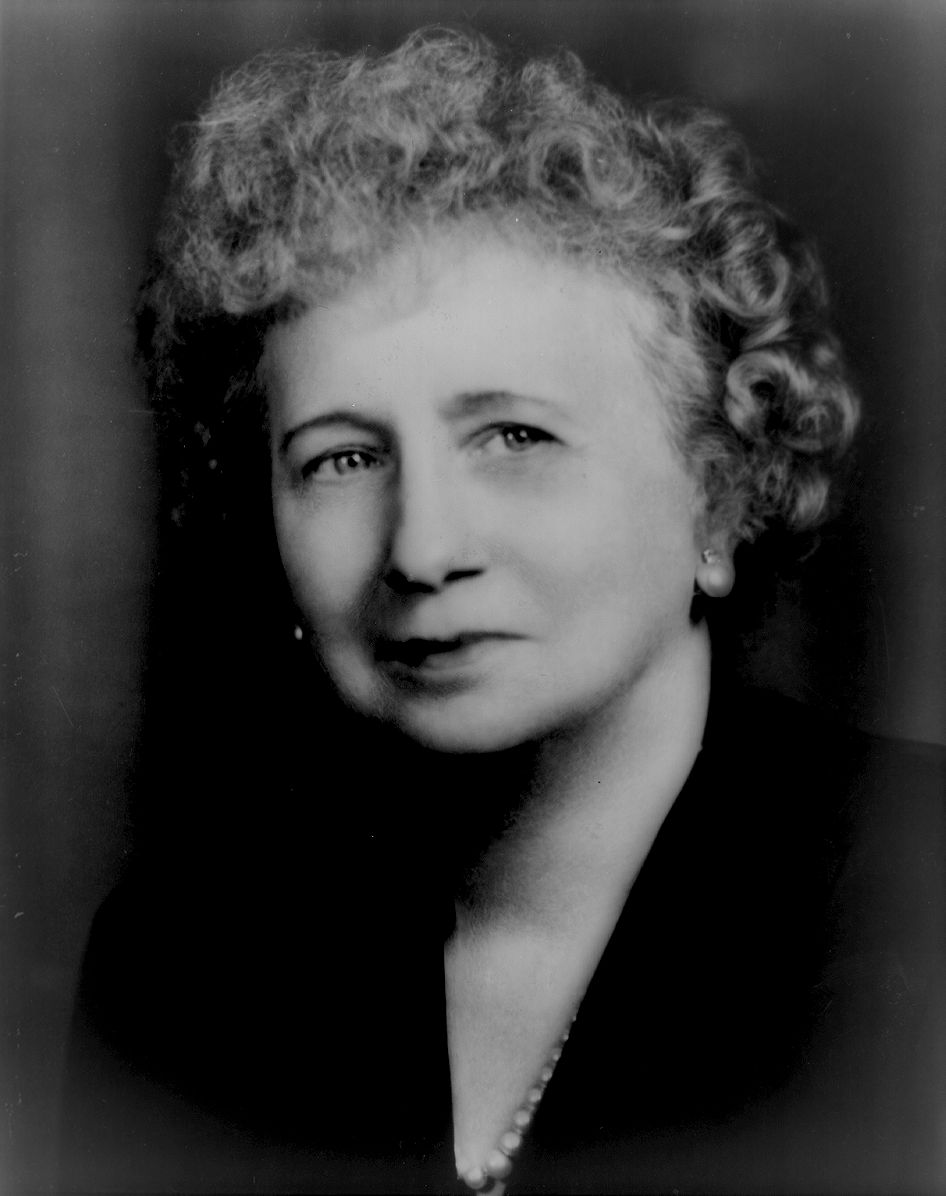
Bess Truman

- Pierre Mendès France, 75, French politician, 93rd Prime Minister of France
- Nellie Mae Rowe, 82, African-American artist, she realized fantasy-like landscapes in her drawings and paintings,multiple myeloma
- Bess Truman, 97, first lady of the United States from 1945 until 1953, she briefly served as the second lady of the United States in 1945,congestive heart failure
- Anne Winton, 33, American ballerina, martial artist and film actress, she held a black belt in Taekwondo and she also studied Aikido, she was the first Caucasian female martial artist to appear in a Hong Kong martial arts film, she was stabbed to death by her own husband in a murder-suicide

=== 19 ===
- Paul America, 38, American actor, he was a member of Andy Warhol's Superstars and he was regarded as a gay icon, killed in a road accident, struck by a motorist while walking home

=== 22 ===
- Savitri Devi, 77, French-born Greek Nazi and animal rights activist, spy, and author, she was a proponent of a synthesis of Hinduism and Nazism, proclaiming Adolf Hitler to have been an avatar of the Hindu god Vishnu, she was an influential figure in esoteric neo-Nazism, heart attack and coronary thrombosis

=== 24 ===
- Lottice Howell, 84, American coloratura soprano and actress

=== 26 ===
- Giovanni Benelli, 61, Italian Catholic prelate, Archbishop of Florence from 1977 until his death in 1982, Substitute for General Affairs from 1967 until 1977, he was one of the leading moderate candidates for the Papacy in the conclaves of August and October 1978
- Valerio Zurlini, 56, Italian stage and film director, screenwriter, and educator working for the film school Centro Sperimentale di Cinematografia (Experimental Center of Cinematography; CSC)

=== 27 ===
- Miguel Ydígoras Fuentes, 87, Guatemalan military officer and politician, he served as the President of Guatemala from 1958 until 1963, when he was deposed by the 1963 Guatemalan coup d'état, Ydígoras had allowed the CIA to train the Cuban exile force that was used in the failed Bay of Pigs Invasion,cerebral hemorrhage

=== 29 ===
- William Lloyd Webber, 68, English composer, organist, and music teacher at the Royal College of Music, representative of 20th-century classical music
- Thomas Thompson, 49, American non-fiction writer and journalist, he wrote a number of true crime books,liver disease

=== 30 ===
- Tim Davis, 58, American child actor and voice actor, he voiced the young Thumper and the adult Flower in the animated feature film Bambi (1942), veteran member of the United States Navy
- Iryna Vilde, 75, Ukrainian novelist, short story writer, and correspondent

=== 31 ===
- Dick Merrill, 88, American aviation pioneer, in 1936 Merrill completed a round-trip transatlantic flight, reaching his initial destination in London after 18 hours and 36 minutes, the fastest Atlantic crossing to date, Merrill managed the Shannon Air Museum in Fredericksburg, Virginia until his death in 1982

== Sources ==
- Curti, Roberto (2015). Italian Gothic Horror Films 1957-1969. McFarland & Company. ISBN 978-1-4766-1989-7.
- Gardell, Mattias (2003). Gods of the Blood: The Pagan Revival and White Separatism. Durham: Duke University Press. ISBN 978-0-8223-8450-2.
- Gibson, Bryan R. (2015). Sold Out? US Foreign Policy, Iraq, the Kurds, and the Cold War. Middle East today. New York, NY: Palgrave Macmillan. ISBN 978-1-137-48711-7.
- Gordon, Max (Summer 1971). "A Case History of U. S. Subversion: Guatemala, 1954". Science and Society. 35 (2): 129–155. JSTOR 40401561.
- Greer, John Michael (2003). "Devi, Savitri". The New Encyclopedia of the Occult. St. Paul: Llewellyn Publications. pp. 130–131. ISBN 978-1-56718-336-8.
- Healy, John Paul (2010), Yearning to Belong: Discovering a New Religious Movement, Ashgate Publishing, Ltd.
- Kaplan, Jeffrey, ed. (2000). Encyclopedia of White Power: A Sourcebook on the Radical Racist Right. Walnut Creek: AltaMira Press. ISBN 978-0-7425-0340-3.
- Lee Kogan and Nellie Mae Rowe, The Art of Nellie Mae Rowe: Ninety Nine and a Half Won't Do (New York: Museum of American Folk Art, 1998)
- May, Rachel (March 1999). ""Surviving All Changes is Your Destiny": Violence and Popular Movements in Guatemala". Latin American Perspectives. 26 (2): 68–91. doi:10.1177/0094582x9902600204. S2CID 143564997.
- Ostwald, Peter F. (1997). Glenn Gould: The Ecstasy and Tragedy of Genius. New York: W. W. Norton. ISBN 978-0-393-04077-7. Archived from the original on September 4, 2023.
- Rodarmor, William (1983). "The Secret Life of Swami Muktananda". CoEvolution Quarterly.
- Urban, Hugh B. (2012), The Cult of Ecstasy: Meldings of East and West in a New Age of Tantra, in the book Tantra: Sex, Secrecy, Politics, and Power in the Study of Religion, University of California Press, pp. 203–263, JSTOR 10.1525/j.ctt1pp4mm.12
- Williamson, Lola (2010), Transcendent in America: Hindu-Inspired Meditation Movements as New Religion, New York University Press
