= Julian Darley =

British writer and filmmaker

Julian Darley (born in London) is a British filmmaker, writer and speaker on policy responses to global environmental degradation. He is the author of the book High Noon for Natural Gas, and the founder of Global Public Media, Post Carbon Institute and Mysterious Movies Ltd.

== Educational background ==
Darley earned a MSc in Environment and Sociology from the University of Surrey, publishing a thesis that examined the BBC coverage of complex environmental issues. He also received an MA in Journalism from the University of Texas at Austin, where he wrote a thesis about the elimination of television.

== Political works ==
In pursuit of better understanding of hydrocarbon, Darley wrote a book called High Noon for Natural Gas: the New Energy Crisis about a natural gas crisis in North America and other industrialized nations. He also co-authored Relocalize Now! Getting Ready for Climate Change and the End of Cheap Oil (2005, unreleased) in collaboration with Celine Rich, Dave Room and Richard Heinberg, a book tackling the subjects of "global relocalization" of economy, society and culture.
