= Twilight's Last Gleaming (disambiguation) =

Twilight's Last Gleaming is a 1977 German-American film directed by Robert Aldrich.

Twilight's Last Gleaming may also refer to:

- "twilight's last gleaming", a phrase from the national anthem of the United States, "The Star-Spangled Banner"
- Twilight's Last Gleaming (novel), a 2014 novel by John Michael Greer
- Twilights Last Gleaming, a 1997 album by the British hip hop group Gunshot
- Twilight's Last Gleaming Cross Country Challenge, an annual running race held in Ventura, California

== See also ==
- "Last Gleaming", a storyline in the Buffy the Vampire Slayer Season Eight comic book series
