= The Party's Over: Oil, War, and the Fate of Industrial Societies =

2005 book by Richard Heinberg

- Paperback edition cover
- Author: Richard Heinberg
- Language: English
- Subject: Peak oil
- Genre: Science
- Publisher: New Society Publishers
- Publication date: June 1, 2005
- Publication place: United States
- Media type: Print, e-book
- Pages: 288 pp.
- ISBN: 0-86571-482-7

The Party’s Over: Oil, War and the Fate of Industrial Societies, by Richard Heinberg, is an introduction to the concept of peak oil and petroleum depletion.

== Overview ==
The book's main points are that modern industrial societies are completely dependent on fossil fuels; they are vulnerable to reductions in energy availability; fossil fuel depletion is inevitable; peak oil is imminent; and that oil plays a major role in US foreign policy, terrorism, war, and geopolitics.

The book rapidly surveys some basic ecological and thermodynamical concepts, which are then briefly applied to Western history. Means by which humans capture more energy and thereby raise their carrying capacity such as takeover, tool use, scope enlargement, and drawdown are also introduced. The preceding strategies are adapted from William Catton's Overshoot. Colonialism and slavery are then viewed using the lens of energy capture and usage. Heinberg also relies upon work done by Joseph Tainter and his 1988 book, The Collapse of Complex Societies. Tainter's main thesis is that complex societies collapse because "their strategies for energy capture are subject to the law of diminishing returns."

It then reviews the essential role of fossil fuels in the history of industrial civilization and capitalism and then discusses why many geologists and energy researches believe that global oil production is on the verge of peaking. Alternative energy sources are then discussed to see if they can make up for the energetic shortfall resulting from less available energy from fossil fuels, his tongue-in-cheek question being: “Can the party continue?” Heinberg is not optimistic that it will and in a sobering wrapup reviews “a banquet of consequences” of the end of cheap energy. He ends the book by offering practical advice to readers about how to respond to the end of the era of cheap oil.

Three petroleum geologists assisted Heinberg, ASPO founder, Colin Campbell, Jean Laherrere, and Walter Youngquist. Colin Campbell also contributed the foreword to the book and Heinberg quotes from his research in the book. In addition, he quotes from the work of (and gives appreciation to) Michael C. Lynch, Bjørn Lomborg, and Richard Duncan.

== See also ==
- Power Down: Options and Actions for a Post-Carbon World
- Beyond Oil
