= William R. Catton Jr. =

American sociologist (1926–2015)

William R. Catton, Jr.
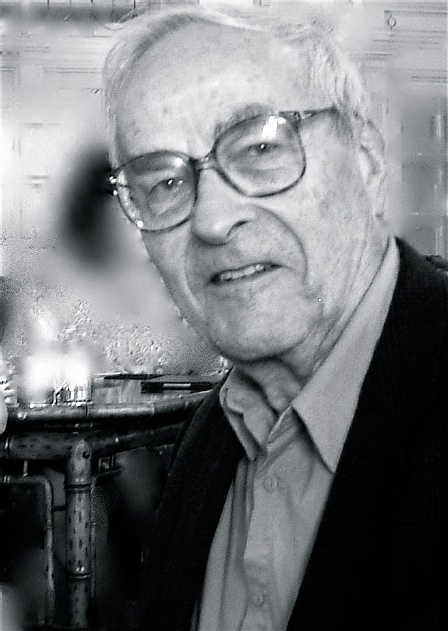
- William R. Catton Jr.
- Born: January 15, 1926
- Died: January 5, 2015 (aged 88)
- Occupation: Environmental sociologist
- Notable work: Overshoot

William Robert Catton Jr. (January 15, 1926 – January 5, 2015) was an American sociologist known for his scholarly work in environmental sociology and human ecology. More broadly, Catton is known for his 1980 book, Overshoot: The Ecological Basis of Revolutionary Change, which is credited by younger generations of environmental scholars and activists as foundational for their own works in calling attention to humanity's role in expanding ecological overshoot to the global level.

== Biography ==
William R. Catton Jr. was the son of a Congregational minister. He was born in Minneapolis, Minnesota on January 15, 1926, and served in the U.S. Navy from 1943 to 1946. After discharge, he enrolled at Oberlin College, where he met Nancy Lewis. The two were married in 1949; they had four sons.

Catton graduated from Oberlin with an A.B. degree in 1950, whereupon he entered the graduate program in sociology at the University of Washington. He earned his M.A. there in 1952 and a Ph.D. in 1954, returning to the university in a professorship post from 1957 through 1969. Catton then moved to New Zealand, where he served as Professor of Sociology at the University of Canterbury from 1970 to 1973, when he returned to the US, taking a post in the sociology department at Washington State University. There he remained until retiring into emeritus status in 1989.

Catton served as president of the Pacific Sociological Association 1984–85 and as the first chair of the American Sociological Association Section on Environmental Sociology.

He died on January 5, 2015, while visiting family in New Zealand. He was 88 years old.

== Legacy ==
=== The academic field of environmental sociology ===
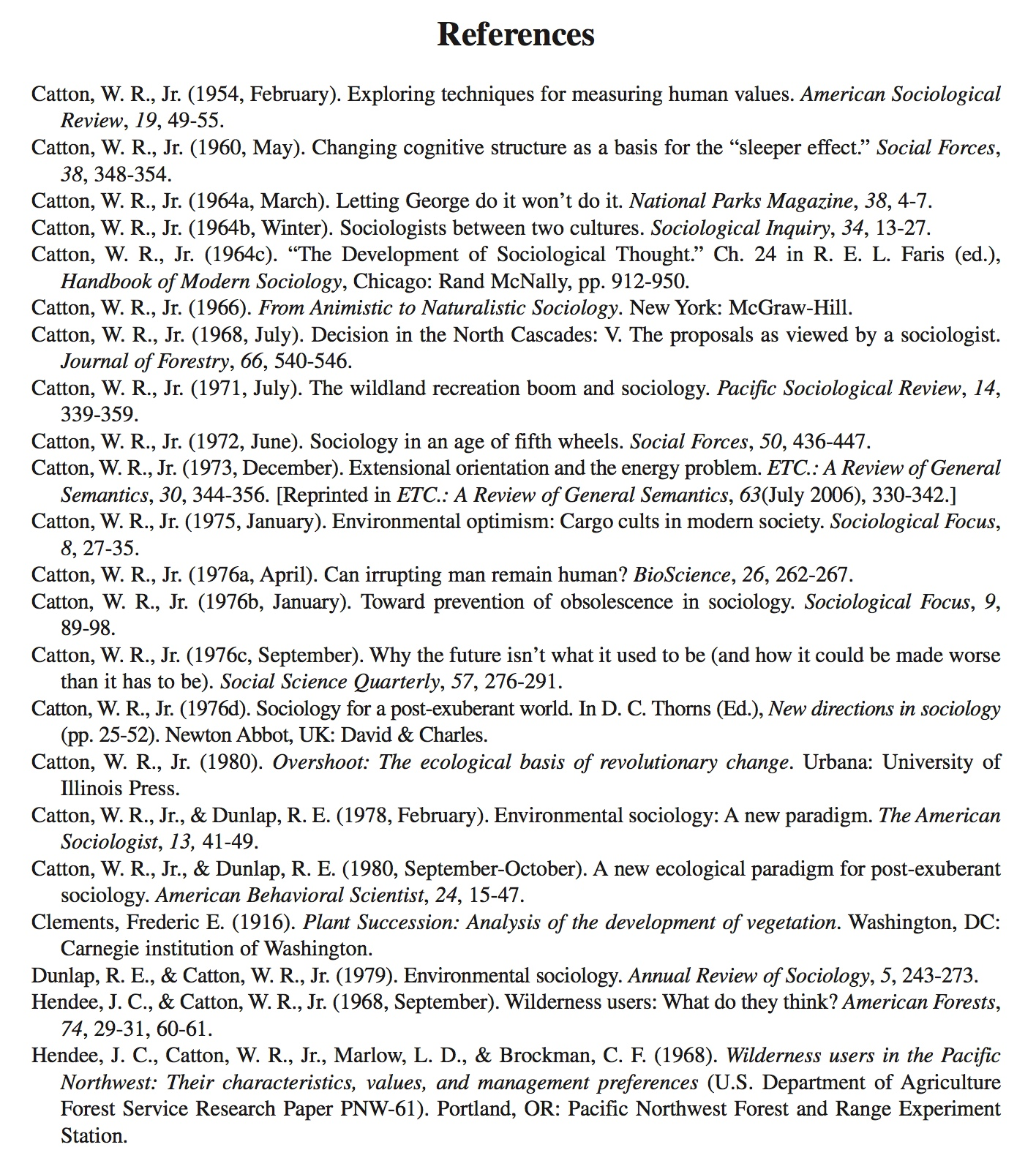
These were the references William R. Catton used in a 2008 "retrospective" portraying his paradigm shift into environmental sociology.

William Catton came of age in sociology when the major debates were about social-only theoretical orientations (structural-functionalism or consensus theory versus Marxism or conflict theory), and methodology (quantitative versus qualitative). His primary contribution was the articulation of an environmental sociological framework that challenged existing sociological theories in general from a completely different tack: by synthesizing sociological and ecological theory.

Catton joined with his colleague Riley E. Dunlap in 1978 to coauthor the first substantial paper that not only came to establish the field of environmental sociology but did so by advocating for a shift in paradigm. Titled, "Environmental Sociology: A New Paradigm," Catton and Dunlap grounded their critique of then-mainstream sociology as bearing the burden of (what they would later call) the "human exceptionalist paradigm," by which humans were presumed exempt from the ecological constraints facing all other species.

In their view, sociological research and writing were fundamentally marred. The main stream failed to recognize that human dependence on finite natural resources (such as fossil fuel energy) along with human degradation of the air, water, soils, and biological processes on which humanity also depends would ultimately impinge on human social systems in powerful ways.

Thirty years later, the introductory paper (by Richard York) for the "Symposium on Catton and Dunlap’s Foundational Work Establishing an Ecological Paradigm" concluded that "The effect of Catton and Dunlap’s work has been profound, since it opened up a large swath of new terrain to sociological inquiry. It made possible the growing body of research in sociology that examines both human effects on the environment and the effects of the environment on society." York listed as "foundational" to the field not only the 1978 "New Paradigm" collaboration by Catton and Dunlap, but also their coauthored papers published in the Annual Review of Sociology in 1979 and American Behavioral Scientist in 1980. Together, these provided "an explicit intellectual grounding for environmental sociology — defined as the study of societal-environmental interactions."

=== Environmental writers and activists ===
Tom Butler, former editor of Wild Earth magazine, inserted a dedication to Catton in the 2015 book he edited, which was titled Overdevelopment, Overpopulation, Overshoot. There, Butler described Catton as "peerless teacher on the perils of overshoot."

Accolades to Catton, following his death, revealed the breadth and depth of his influence upon well known voices in environmental advocacy. In a 5 February 2015 post on a Huffington Post blog, Michael Dowd quoted brief testimonials from Paul R. Ehrlich, Alan Weisman, Derrick Jensen, and Reed Noss, as well as links and titles to two self-standing tributes: "As Night Closes In" by John Michael Greer and "Thanks, Bill" by Richard Heinberg. Dowd described Catton as "one of the most significant and influential ecological thinkers of the past century" who was "an inspiration to a host of climate change, peak oil, and sustainability-oriented leaders." Dowd continued to aggregate on his own website more tributes as well as linked lists of Catton's major papers and reviews of his books and other works.

Another 2015 tribute to Catton, by the writer Kurt Cobb, offered that "Perhaps the most important thing to note about Catton is that he did not blame anyone for the human predicament. To him that predicament is the natural outcome of evolutionary processes and the powers given to humans through those processes. That predicament is no more a product of conscious thought and intention than is the beating of our own hearts."

Twenty years earlier, Derrick Jensen similarly chose to highlight Catton's generosity of soul — despite the dark certainty of humanity's future. In his 1995 book, Listening to the Land, Jensen chose to introduce his interview with Catton by way of this pull-quote from Catton's book Overshoot: "In a future that is as unavoidable as it will be unwelcome, survival and sanity may depend upon our ability to cherish rather than to disparage the concept of human dignity."

=== The legacy of Catton's 1980 book, Overshoot ===
Overshoot: The Ecological Basis of Revolutionary Change was published in 1980 by University of Illinois Press. Catton began writing the manuscript during a three-year post as Professor of Sociology at the University of Canterbury in New Zealand, then returning to his home country in 1973 as Professor of Sociology at Washington State University. During this period Catton, in collaboration with fellow scholar, Riley E. Dunlap, produced a series of influential articles on ecological issues, as referenced above. In an obituary for Catton published in the journal New Zealand Sociology, Riley E. Dunlap wrote, "I always describe Overshoot as a superb ecological history of Homo sapiens and analysis of our evolution into what Bill called Homo colossus, yielding a profound understanding of our current ecological dilemma."

Catton put his neologism Homo colossus in context on p. 170 of Overshoot:

When the earth's deposits of fossil fuels and mineral resources were being laid down, Homo sapiens had not yet been prepared by evolution to take advantage of them. As soon as technology made it possible for mankind to do so, people eagerly (and without foreseeing the ultimate consequences) shifted to a high-energy way of life. Man became, in effect, a detritivore, Homo colossus. Our species bloomed, and now we must expect a crash (of some sort) as the natural sequel.

That the manuscript itself attracted an icon of the environmental movement, former U.S. Interior Secretary Stewart Udall, to write the book's foreword was a sign of the popular (and activist) reach the book would garner. That reach included wilderness advocate Dave Foreman, a cofounder of EarthFirst! and of Wild Earth magazine. In a reflection upon Catton's death, Foreman wrote:

William Catton's Overshoot is one of the most important books I've ever read, and Bill was one of my greatest teachers." Catton attributed his own wilderness experiences in national parks of the USA as the source of his drive to understand ecological systems and ecological limits — including the fundamental ecological principle of carrying capacity.

Applying his national parks experience to sociology, Catton joined with researchers John Hendee of the Forest Service and Frank Brockman of the College of Forest Resources, University of Washington, while Catton served as Professor of Sociology at that university from 1957 to 1969. As reported in an obituary by his family members, "Catton’s research on recreational carrying capacity in the national parks formed the seedbed from which his ideas about human carrying capacity on a global scale later germinated." In his 2008 paper, "A Retrospective View of My Development as an Environmental Sociologist," Catton traced his fascination for learning ecological principles for the purpose of applying them to sociology. He wrote of his experience in New Zealand:

It was clear to me now that if a national park could be damaged by overuse, so could a continent or even a whole planet. I was beginning to see the enormous relevance of such ecological concepts as sere, seral stages, reaction, succession, climax, food chain, trophic level, dominance — and especially carrying capacity — for a thoroughly nonlocal sociology.

As with carrying capacity, overshoot is a standard term in the ecological sciences. In his 2015 obituary for Catton, John Michael Greer put this ecological term into its activist context: "The core of Overshoot, which is also the core of the entire world of appropriate technology and green alternatives ... is the recognition that the principles of ecology apply to industrial society just as much as they do to other communities of living things."

Indigenous writer and advocate Vine Deloria officially endorsed Catton's work in his quotation on the book's back cover. He called it "one of the most important books I have read in my lifetime."

In a 2021 guest post titled, "Overshoot: Where We Now Stand," Michael Dowd wrote that Catton's book is "the single most important book I have ever read." He also quotes Richard Heinberg saying, "Climate change is not our biggest problem; overshoot is. Global warming is but a symptom of ecological overshoot."

The 30th anniversary of the book's publication elicited an 8-page article in Human Ecology Review urging academics to reacquaint themselves with Catton's synthesis:

Environmental sociology and related disciplines should seek to rediscover the message in Overshoot and actively pursue a cohesive theoretical direction that challenges the assumptions that drive environmentally destructive behaviors and threaten humanity’s very survival.

Summing up the purpose of all his sociological writings after the publication of Overshoot, Catton wrote in 2008:

From about 1980 onward, my writing, either solo or in tandem, has sought to spread awareness of the urgent need for everyone, including sociologists, to recognize that our lifestyles, mores, institutions, patterns of interaction, values, and expectations are shaped by a cultural heritage that was formed in a time when carrying capacity exceeded the human load. A cultural heritage can outlast the conditions that produced it. That carrying capacity surplus is gone now, eroded both by population increase and immense technological enlargement of per capita resource appetites and environmental impacts. Human life is now being lived in an era of deepening carrying capacity deficit. All of the familiar aspects of human societal life are under compelling pressure to change in this new era when the load increasingly exceeds the carrying capacities of many local regions — and of a finite planet. Social disorganization, friction, demoralization, and conflict will escalate.

== Awards and honors ==
(As listed in the 2016 Catton obituary published in New Zealand Sociology journal.)

- 1983, Fellow of the Institute for Human Ecology
- 1985, Distinguished Scholarship Award, Pacific Sociological Association
- 1985, Award of Merit, Natural Resources Research Group, Rural Sociological Society, (co-recipient with Riley E. Dunlap)
- 1986, Award for Distinguished Contribution, Section on Environmental Sociology, American Sociological Association (co-recipient with Riley E. Dunlap)
- 1989, Distinguished Achievement Award, College of Sciences and Arts, Washington State University

== Works ==
=== Books (sole author) ===
- Catton, William Robert (1966). From animistic to naturalistic sociology. New York: McGraw-Hill. OCLC 490221696.
- Catton Jr., William R. (1980). Overshoot: The Ecological Basis of Revolutionary Change. Urbana: University of Illinois Press. ISBN 9780252098000.
- Catton Jr., William R. (2009). Bottleneck: Humanity's Impending Impasse. Xlibris Corporation. ISBN 978-1-4415-2241-2.

=== Books (co-author) ===
- Otto N. Larsen; William R. Catton (1962). Conceptual Sociology: A Manual of Exercises Relating Concepts to Specimens, Principles, and Definitions. Harper & Row.
- Lundberg, George A.; Schrag, Clarence C.; Larsen, Otto N.; Catton, William R. (1968). Sociology (4th ed.). New York: Harper & Row, 1968.

=== Articles ===
- Catton, William R. (April 1976). "Commentary: Can Irrupting Man Remain Human?". BioScience. 26 (4): 262–267. doi:10.2307/1297349. JSTOR 1297349.
- Catton, William R.; Dunlap, Riley E. (February 1978). "Environmental Sociology". The American Sociologist. 13 (1): 41–49.
- Catton, William R.; Dunlap, Riley E. (November 1978). "Paradigms, Theories, and the Primacy of the HEP-NEP Distinction". The American Sociologist. 13 (10): 256–259.
- Catton, William R.; Dunlap, Riley E. (September–October 1980). "A New Ecological Paradigm for Post-Exuberant Society". American Behavioral Scientist (24): 15–47. doi:10.1177/000276428002400103.
- Freese, Lee, ed. (April 1992). "Separation versus Unification in Sociological Human Ecology". Advances in Human Ecology. 1. Greenwich, Connecticut, United States: JAI Press: 65–99.
- Catton, William R. (January 2007). "Carrying Capacity and the Death of a Culture: A Tale of Two Autopsies". Sociological Inquiry. 63 (2): 202–223. doi:10.1111/j.1475-682X.1993.tb00303.x.
- "What Have We Done to Carrying Capacity?". Human Ecology: Progress Through Integrative Perspectives. Bar Harbor, Maine, United States: The Society for Human Ecology: 162–170. April 1995.
- "The Problem of Denial". School of Biological Sciences. University of Texas. 1994.
- "Malthus: More Relevant Than Ever" (PDF). Population Institute of Canada.
- Catton, William R. (June 1987). "The World's Most Polymorphic Species". BioScience. 37 (6): 413–419. doi:10.2307/1310565. JSTOR 1310565.
- Catton, William R. (1999). "Overcoming Patriarchy and Sexism Won't Save Us". Human Ecology Review. 6 (2): 112–115. ISSN 1074-4827. JSTOR 24707063.
- Catton, Jr., William R (March 2000). "Worse than Foreseen by Malthus (even if the living do not outnumber the dead)". The International Society of Malthus. Archived from the original on 5 September 2019.
- Catton, Jr., William R. (7 October 2003). "Tribute to Garrett Hardin". The Garrett Hardin Society.
- Catton Jr., William R. (2012). "Sociology's Neglect of Ecological Context". In Erasga, Dennis (ed.). Sociological Landscape: Theories, Realities and Trends. BoD – Books on Demand. ISBN 978-953-51-0460-5.

=== Videos ===
- Excerpt interview on YouTube from What a Way to Go: Life at the End of Empire produced by Sally Erickson. Written, directed, and edited by Tim Bennett, 2007.
- Interview with William R. Catton, Jr. produced by Frank Rotering, 2008. 49 min.

=== Audios ===
- Soundcloud Playlist: William R. Catton, Jr. - posted on Michael Dowd's SoundCloud account.
