= Food libel laws =

Libel laws in the United States

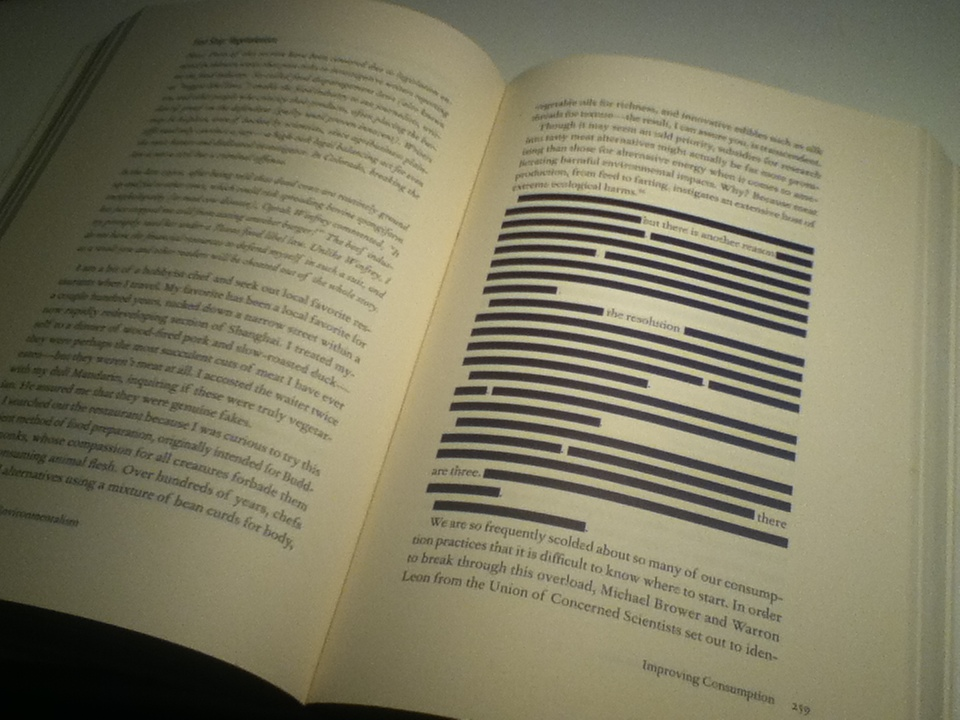
All copies of the environmental book Green Illusions sold in the United States were self-censored due to concerns about food libel laws that enable the damages to be awarded when a court rules that someone has made libelous statements about a food product.

Food libel laws, also known as food disparagement laws and informally as veggie libel laws, are laws passed in thirteen U.S. states that make it easier for food producers to sue their critics for libel. These thirteen states are the following: Alabama, Arizona, Colorado, Florida, Georgia, Idaho, Louisiana, Mississippi, North Dakota, Ohio, Oklahoma, South Dakota, and Texas. Many of the food-disparagement laws establish a lower standard for civil liability and allow for punitive damages and attorney's fees for plaintiffs alone, regardless of the case's outcome.

These laws vary significantly from state to state, but food libel laws typically allow a food manufacturer or processor to sue a person or group who makes disparaging comments about their food products. In some states these laws also establish different standards of proof than are used in traditional American libel lawsuits, including the practice of placing the burden of proof on the party being sued.

An example of the situation is the New York Times reporting about "facts from a study showing the amounts of lead found in over-the-counter calcium supplements" being censored.

== Origins ==
On February 26, 1989, CBS News' 60 Minutes aired a segment entitled "'A' is for Apple", in which 60 Minutes anchors investigated a report published by the Natural Resources Defense Council on the safety of daminozide, a growth regulator used on apples to preserve their freshness. The NRDC, and 60 Minutes along with them, claimed that daminozide, sold under the brand name Alar, was carcinogenic, especially when consumed by children. According to the report, Alar remained in apple skin even after processing, meaning that not only raw apples, but also apple products, like apple juice and apple sauce, could pose health risks.

Immediately after the segment aired, consumers panicked and apple sales declined by nearly 60% nationwide. Growers reported revenue losses of $100M as a result. Seeking recompense, eleven Washington State apple growers banded together to sue CBS for trade libel: the intentional publication of false information about a product. Trade libel laws stipulate that the burden of proof falls on the plaintiff, meaning that the growers needed to prove in court by "the preponderance of the evidence" that 60 Minutes' claims about daminozide's carcinogenicity were dubious in order for the jury to decide in their favor. The growers failed to do so, and their case was dismissed as a result. In response, lobbyists affiliated with the agricultural industry began to campaign for stricter trade libel laws specific to agricultural products. They argued that agricultural products deserved special protections because of their perishability: they might spoil before the truth of claims regarding their safety had been verified. As a result, thirteen states adopted food libel laws, which offer larger settlement sums than regular trade libel laws and, unlike trade libel laws, often place the burden of proof on a case's defendant, rather than its plaintiff.

The Economist reported that "The Environmental Protection Agency (EPA) eventually decided that Alar was indeed a carcinogen."

== Notable cases ==
=== Texas Beef Group v. Winfrey ===
In 1998, television talk-show host Oprah Winfrey and one of her guests, Howard Lyman, were involved in a lawsuit, commonly referred to as the Amarillo, Texas beef trial, surrounding the Texas version of a food libel law known as the False Disparagement of Perishable Food Products Act of 1995. The words "Cows are herbivores. They shouldn't be eating other cows ... It has just stopped me cold from eating another burger." were attributed to Winfrey as part of a 1996 episode of her show. It was accused that the two made disparaging comments about beef in relation to mad cow disease. Although they were not the first people to be sued using this type of legal action, this case created a media sensation.

In a normal U.S. libel suit, the plaintiff must prove that the defendant is deliberately and knowingly spreading false information. Under the Texas food disparagement law under which Winfrey and Lyman were sued, the plaintiffs—in this case, beef feedlot operator Paul Engler and the company Cactus Feeders—had to convince the jury that Lyman's statements on Winfrey's show were not "based on reasonable and reliable scientific inquiry, facts, or data." As a basis for the damages sought in the lawsuit, the plaintiffs noted that cattle futures dropped 10 percent the day after the episode, and that beef prices fell from 62 cents to 55 cents per pound. Engler's attorneys argued that the rancher lost $6.7 million, and the plaintiffs sought to recoup total losses of more than $12 million.

The jury in the case found that the statements by Winfrey and Lyman did not constitute libel against the cattlemen. However, Winfrey no longer speaks publicly on the issue, and declines to make videotapes of the original interview available to inquiring journalists.

=== Beef Products, Inc. v. ABC News (Pink Slime case) ===
On March 7, 2012, ABC News aired a segment dedicated to investigating a beef product called lean finely textured beef (LFTB) sold by the South Dakota beef company Beef Products, Inc (BPI). ABC News correspondents, including Diane Sawyer, reported on a whistleblower's claim that BPI's LFTB was used as a filler in the ground beef sold by many American beef companies, as a way of cutting costs. According to the unknown whistleblower and ABC News, BPI's LFTB was derived from beef trimmings sprayed with ammonia, and resembled "pink slime". Throughout March and April, ABC News continued to run segments and publish articles about BPI's LFTB, including publishing updates on the company's financial losses after the original segment's airing.

On September 12, 2012, BPI sued ABC News for food disparagement under South Dakota's food libel legislation. They claimed that ABC News falsely portrayed their product, lean finely textured beef, as unfit for human consumption. BPI also claimed that ABC News' disparaging content led to serious financial damages for BPI. By their report, sales of BPI's LFTB dropped from five million to two million pounds per week, prompting the closure of three out of four production facilities and the lay-off of 700 employees. ABC News responded by calling for the case to be dismissed, arguing that it was within ABC News' First Amendment rights to investigate matters of possible concern to their viewers.

The case went to trial in June, 2017. Under South Dakota's Agricultural Food Products Disparagement Act, BPI could have received as much as $5.7 billion in statutory trebled damages were ABC News found liable. After the case had been tried for only three out of the expected eight weeks, ABC News and BPI reached a settlement of $177 million. At the time, this was the largest settlement recorded for a media defamation case. The terms of the settlement were not released.

== Criticism ==
Food libel laws have faced opposition from free speech defenders, who argue that they restrict speech about agricultural products to a degree which is unconstitutional. Of particular concern is that some states' food libel laws seem to violate the "of or concerning" precedent which was established in the Supreme Court's 1964 decision on New York Times Co. v. Sullivan. Sullivan, the commissioner of the Montgomery, Alabama, police department, filed suit against the New York Times after the paper ran an advertisement paid for by a civil rights group which criticized the Montgomery police department's treatment of civil rights protestors. The Supreme Court's ruling in favor of the New York Times was supported in part by their argument that the advertisement was not explicitly "of or concerning" Sullivan, and so did not constitute libelous speech. Food libel legislation which defines disparagement of perishable agricultural products as any false statement that implies a product is unsafe, like the legislation present in Louisiana, Mississippi, Texas, and South Dakota, has been thought by some commentators to contradict this "of or concerning" element. Such legislation might allow speech involved in marketing campaigns, like those that tout organic products as superior to their non-organic competitors, to be construed as implying the impurity or poor quality of certain products, and thereby potentially illegal. States which broadly define the parties who are eligible to sue under food libel laws have also come under criticism for disregarding the "of or concerning" element. Critics' argument is that defaming speech about an agricultural product is not explicitly "of or concerning" parties only tangentially related to that product, like its transporters or marketers, meaning that those parties should not be able to file suit if the product is disparaged.

Food libel laws have also been criticized for their non-traditional placement of the burden of proof on the defendant rather than the plaintiff. In both defamation and trade disparagement legislation, plaintiffs are tasked with proving to the court that the speech in question is false. In food libel legislation present in all but two of the states which have food libel laws on their books, defendants are tasked with proving to the courts that their statements about the agricultural product in question are true. This is done by presenting scientific evidence to support the claims made about product safety and enlisting expert witnesses to substantiate those claims. Because these steps are so costly, there is concern that only very wealthy defendants would be able to muster a defense against a food disparagement claim.

For reasons such as those described above, food libel laws and cases filed under them have been accused by online commentators and civil liberties activism groups, such as the Civil Liberties Defense Center, for propagating a chilling effect. In a legal context, the "chilling effect" describes the phenomenon by which speech on a certain subject is indirectly curtailed by the passage of laws. Journalists have reported that simply the risk of legal retaliation for writing about food safety issues has stopped them from doing so. Smaller publishers, without the financial means to mount a defense should the producer of a food product oppose an author's commentary on it, have significantly revised or even canceled potentially liable books. Robert Hatherill's Eat to Beat Cancer and Britt Bailey's Against the Grain: Biotechnology and the Corporate Takeover of Your Food are notable examples of this practice. The former was subject to extensive editing by its publisher—whole sections related to links between meat and cancer were deleted—and the latter was canceled entirely after its publisher received a letter from Monsanto warning of a possible suit. Ozzie Zehner self-censored his Green Illusions, an analysis of the detrimental effects of certain environmental protection initiatives, because it included criticism of agribusiness. In the introduction to the book's chapter on consumption, Zehner wrote, "So-called food disparagement laws (also known as 'veggie libel laws') enable the food industry to sue journalists, writers, and other people who criticize their products, often placing the burden of proof on the defendant ... Unlike Winfrey, I do not have the financial resources to defend myself in such a suit, and as a result you and other readers will be cheated out of the whole story", referencing the Texas Beef Group v. Oprah Winfrey case.

Correspondingly, food libel cases have been alleged to be strategic lawsuits against public participation (SLAPPs). In general, a SLAPP is a defamation or libel suit whose primary purpose is to silence the speaker and intimidate others from engaging in similar speech. In the specific context of food libel, the implication of the term is that agricultural companies sue under food libel laws in hopes of disincentivizing other potential critics lest they too be subjugated to a costly and inconvenient legal battle, rather than to necessarily win the case and recoup the costs of a damaged reputation. Complicating matters, twenty-nine states currently have statutes intended to prevent against the filing of SLAPP suits, including nine of the thirteen states with food libel laws.

== In media ==
Public awareness of food libel laws and their impacts rose after the airing of Robert Kenner's 2008 documentary Food Inc., which attempted to investigate the commercial production of food. The documentary featured a scene in which Robert Kenner interviewed Barbara Kowalcyk, a scientist and food-safety activist whose son had died after eating a hamburger contaminated with E. coli. When Kenner asks Kowalcyk how her eating habits have changed after her son's death, she replies that she is unable to discuss the subject because doing so might open her up to a lawsuit under food libel legislation.

The laws are parodied in the King of the Hill episode "Love Hurts and So Does Art" (1999) in which a modern art exhibit, juxtaposing a starving child with an X-ray of an American's colon blocked with beef, is shut down, because "in the state of Texas, there's a law against defaming beef."

== See also ==
- Personal Responsibility in Food Consumption Act
- Chilling effect (law)
- Ag-gag
- McLibel case
