= Overshoot (book) =

1980 non-fiction book by William R. Catton

Overshoot: The Ecological Basis of Revolutionary Change
- Author: William R. Catton Jr.
- Language: English
- Subject: Demography, ecology, sociology
- Genre: Essay
- Publisher: University of Illinois Press
- Publication date: 1980
- Pages: 298
- ISBN: 0252009886
- OCLC: 16587666

Overshoot: The Ecological Basis of Revolutionary Change is a book by American sociologist William R. Catton Jr. The book is divided into several parts and discusses how humanity's overexploitation of Earth's resources has led to human consumption exceeding the planet's capacity for regeneration.

== Background ==
Catton began writing the manuscript that would become this book during a three-year post as Professor of Sociology at the University of Canterbury in Christchurch, New Zealand, then returned to his home country in 1973 as Professor of Sociology at Washington State University. During this period, Catton, in collaboration with fellow scholar Riley E. Dunlap, produced a series of articles on ecological issues.

== Summary ==
The book argues in favour of a new perspective on the exploitation of resources, which it holds threatens future generations, and calls for questioning established ways of thinking in favor of greater environmental awareness.

It describes what the author terms "the tragic story of human success": a period of rapid population growth and technological innovation that pushed humanity beyond the planet's carrying capacity.

The book contends that this overshoot has been worsened by technological advances and a culture of abundance, and describes a decline from what the author terms "the Age of Exuberance", a period when abundance and liberty rested on now-eroding ecological conditions.

It examines the ecological causes of this decline, drawing on Malthus's 1798 Essay on the Principle of Population, the history of tool use, and the Industrial Revolution. Malthus argued that populations grow exponentially while subsistence grows only linearly, producing food shortages once a population's biotic potential exceeds its habitat's carrying capacity.

== Reception ==
Robert Wisniewski, reviewing the book for the Humboldt Journal of Social Relations, called it intellectually demanding but valuable for readers willing to engage with its ecological argument about an impending population decline.

Anne Ehrlich, in the Bulletin of the Atomic Scientists, called it "required reading for decision makers."

In Derrick Jensen's 1995 book Listening to the Land, he introduced his interview with Catton using a passage from Overshoot: "In a future that is as unavoidable as it will be unwelcome, survival and sanity may depend upon our ability to cherish rather than to disparage the concept of human dignity."

Dave Foreman, cofounder of Earth First! and Wild Earth magazine, called Overshoot one of the most important books he had read and Catton one of his greatest teachers.

Tom Butler, a former Wild Earth editor, dedicated his 2015 book Overdevelopment, Overpopulation, Overshoot to Catton, describing him as a "peerless teacher on the perils of overshoot."

In a 2023 review, Paul Mobbs argued that Overshoot is less about the ecological processes of overshoot and collapse than about how humans collectively respond to them.
