= The New Encyclopedia of the Occult =

2003 book by John Michael Greer

- Cover
- Author: John Michael Greer
- Language: English
- Subject: Occultism
- Publisher: Llewellyn Publications
- Publication date: 2003
- Publication place: United States
- Media type: Print (paperback)
- Pages: 555
- ISBN: 1-56718-336-0
- OCLC: 52311852
- Dewey Decimal: 133.03
- LC Class: BF1407.G74 2003

The New Encyclopedia of the Occult is an encyclopedia by John Michael Greer, published in 2003 by Llewellyn Publications. The book aims to cover "the whole range" of the Western occult tradition; it contains 1,500 entries on occultist topics, including groups, people, and broader topics like magic and Tarot. Greer was himself an occultist, as well as a scholar of the occult, and had previously written several books on the occult.

To research the encyclopedia, Greer incorporated both scholarly sources on the occult and primary and historical sources. The encyclopedia received positive reviews for its research, approach to the material, and its bibliography. It was recognized by the American Library Association as an Outstanding Reference Work of 2005.

== Background and publication history ==
The New Encyclopedia of the Occult was written by John Michael Greer. Greer was then a Seattle-based occultist, Druid, and Freemason, and was involved in other kinds of occultism. He was also a scholar of the occult and had authored several books on the subject previously. In writing the book, he consulted scholarly works on occultism, as well as occultist primary and historical sources like grimoires. The book was first published by Llewellyn Publications in 2003, in a 555-page paperback edition. The book's back claims that it is "Presenting the Most Complete Occult Reference Work Ever".

== Contents ==
In an introduction, Greer presents The New Encyclopedia of the Occult as the first book by an occultist that has also been informed by the scholarly literature on the occult. Greer writes that the encyclopedia "attempts to cover the whole range of occult tradition, lore, history, philosophy, and practice in the Western world", and that the book is aimed both at practicing occultists and outsiders seeking information on occultism. He argues that "the realm of the occult contains truth and nonsense, profound wisdom and prodigious folly", and criticizes much existing occult literature as purveying misinformation.

The encyclopedia has over 1,500 entries, which are arranged in alphabetical order and vary in length from a few sentences to several pages long. There are biographical entries, as well as entries on broad topics such as magic, astrology, alectryomancy, necromancy, and Tarot. It also covers groups such as the Golden Dawn, or broader movements like neopaganism, Theosophy, and Wicca. Greer avoided giving entries to those still alive, though otherwise the book covers both modern and ancient occultism. The book is illustrated and contains a bibliography, arranged by author name. The bibliography is 23 pages. Entries have cross references and further reading sections. There is no index.

== Reception ==
The New Encyclopedia of the Occult was recognized by the American Library Association as an Outstanding Reference Work of 2005. The book received praise for the amount of information it provided, its neutrality, and its bibliography. Writing for Choice magazine, L. A. Beinhoff called it "essential", and complimented it for dispelling occult misinformation. Booklist noted the encyclopedia as "sympathetic to the arcane lore", but lacking the errors of typical occult literature. Mike Gleason, writing for Spiral Nature Magazine, an occult publication, said that he found nothing to criticize in all the entries on topics he was familiar with, though he found he often disagreed with Greer's conclusions.

Library Journal's Mimi Davis praised it as "well-researched, informative, and unbiased"; Davis recommended it to libraries and all with an interest in the subject. Davis noted its inclusion of both major and obscure topics. Kenneth Slagle called it "the book of choice" for those wishing to learn about modern occultism. Slagle wrote that, despite the fact that Greer was himself a pagan, Greer had useful information and was aware of the misinformation prevalent in occultist topics. He complimented Greer for pointing out historical and factual inaccuracies in the material he covered. Booklist called the entries "clearly written" and "very informative"; they said it would be useful to both occultists and outsider observers, and recommended the book. American Libraries said it was "authoritative and engaging", and "extensively researched yet concise". Beinhoff noted that it lacked entries on Native American, Eastern, and African kinds of occultism, while Slagle criticized it for focusing too much on modern occultism and having too few pre-1900 entries. Several reviewers praised the bibliography as extensive.

Several reviewers compared The New Encyclopedia of the Occult to J. Gordon Melton and Leslie A. Shepard's the Encyclopedia of Occultism & Parapsychology, which reviewers felt was superior to Greer's book, though noted Greer's to be more affordable and to have more information on specific topics. It was also compared to the 2007 book The Encyclopedia of Magic and Alchemy by Rosemary Ellen Guiley.
