= Gnosticon =

Magical and neo-pagan convention

Gnosticon, sometimes called the Gnostica Aquarian Convention, was a magical and Neopagan event sponsored by Carl L. Weschcke and Llewellyn Publications from 1971 through 1976, held in Minneapolis, Minnesota, one of the first such to be held in the United States. In 1970 Weschcke opened the Gnostica Bookstore in Minneapolis together with the Gnostica School for Self-Development. The first of several festivals was staged the following year, called the "First American Aquarian Festival of Astrology and the Occult Sciences". Later festivals were renamed and became known as 'Gnosticon'.
