= American Council of Witches =

Modern pagan organization, 1973–1974

The American Council of Witches (sometimes called the Council of American Witches) was an independent group founded in 1973 consisting of approximately seventy-three members who followed Pagan, Neopagan, or Witchcraft traditions; the group convened and disbanded in 1974 after drafting a set of common principles.

== History ==
The council convened April 11–14, 1974, in a Spring "Witchmeet" in Minneapolis, Minnesota to postulate a summary set of principles which would clarify the actuality of Neopagan religions in North America, unify and define the many differing beliefs across the many paths and traditions prevalent in Neopaganism at that time, and to counteract misinformation, cultural stigma, stereotypes, and lack of governmental recognition. The council was assembled by Carl Llewellyn Weschcke, president of Llewellyn Worldwide Ltd., one of the largest publishers of occult, Neopagan, and New Age books in the world. These "Principles of Belief", also referred to as "The Thirteen Principles of Belief" or "The Thirteen Principles of Wiccan Belief", are still endorsed by many American Witches, Neopagan groups, and individuals.

In 1978 these principles were incorporated into the United States Army's Religious Requirements and Practices of Certain Selected Groups: A Handbook for Chaplains in a section on the Wiccan religion. This section was prepared under the direction of Rev. Dr. J. Gordon Melton, director of the Institute for the Study of American Religion and editor of the Encyclopedia of American Religion.

The American Council of Witches disbanded later that year due to difficulties in reconciling differences among its members' traditions.

== Views of the Council ==
The position expressed in the document is that modern Witches are not bound to any modern interpretation of historical evidence or any contemporary hierarchy, but are rather subject only to their inherent Divine connection: "We are not bound by traditions from other times and other cultures and owe no allegiance to any person or power greater than the Divinity manifest through our own being."

The Council also expressed a desire to include anyone wishing to be affiliated with a Neopagan tradition, as long as their views, attitudes, and opinions do not contradict or oppose those of the tradition: "In seeking to be inclusive, we do not wish to open ourselves to the destruction of our group by those on self-serving power trips, or to philosophies & practices contradictory to these principles. In seeking to exclude those whose ways are contradictory to ours, we do not want to deny participation with us to any who are sincerely interested in our knowledge & beliefs, regardless of race, color, sex, age, national or cultural origins, or sexual preference."

== Thirteen Principles of Belief ==
In April 1974 members drafted a general set of principles loosely acceptable across the many traditions participating in the Council. These Principles of Wiccan Belief remain important to many modern-day Neopagan groups and individuals.

1. We practice rites to attune ourselves with the natural rhythm of life forces marked by the phases of the Moon and the seasonal Quarters and Cross Quarters.
2. We recognize that our intelligence gives us a unique responsibility towards our environment. We seek to live in harmony with Nature, in ecological balance offering fulfillment to life and consciousness within an evolutionary concept.
3. We acknowledge a depth of power far greater than that is apparent to the average person. Because it is far greater than ordinary it is sometimes called "supernatural", but we see it as lying within that which is naturally potential to all.
4. We conceive of the Creative Power in the universe as manifesting through polarity - as masculine and feminine - and that this same Creative Power lies in all people, and functions through the interaction of the masculine and feminine. We value neither above the other, knowing each to be supportive of the other. We value sex as pleasure, as the symbol and embodiment of life, and as one of the sources of energies used in magickal practice and religious worship.
5. We recognize both outer and inner, or psychological, worlds - sometimes known as the Spiritual World, the Collective Unconscious, Inner Planes, etc. - and we see in the interaction of these two dimensions the basis for paranormal phenomena and magickal exercises. We neglect neither dimension for the other, seeing both as necessary for our fulfillment.
6. We do not recognize any authoritarian hierarchy, but do honor those who teach, respect those who share their greater knowledge and wisdom, and acknowledge those who have courageously given of themselves in leadership.
7. We see religion, magick and wisdom-in-living as being united in the way one views the world and lives within it - a world-view and philosophy of life which we identify as Witchcraft, the Wiccan Way.
8. Calling oneself "Witch" does not make one a Witch - but neither does heredity itself, nor the collecting of titles, degrees and initiations. A Witch seeks to control the forces within her/himself that make life possible in order to live wisely and well without harm to others and in harmony with Nature.
9. We believe in the affirmation and fulfillment of life in a continuation of evolution and development of consciousness, that gives meaning to the Universe we know, and our personal role within it.
10. Our only animosity towards Christianity, or toward any other religion or philosophy of life, is to the extent that its institutions have claimed to be "the only way," and have sought to deny freedom to others and to suppress other ways of religious practice and belief.
11. As American Witches, we are not threatened by debates on the history of the Craft, the origins of various terms, or the origins of various aspects of different traditions. We are concerned with our present and our future.
12. We do not accept the concept of absolute evil, nor do we worship any entity known as "Satan" or "the Devil", as defined by Christian tradition. We do not seek power through the suffering of others, nor do we accept that personal benefit can be derived only by denial to another.
13. We believe that we should seek within Nature that which is contributory to our health and well-being.

== Revival attempts ==
Attempts to revive the Council, first in 2011, and again in 2015, were met with heavy scrutiny from witches and contemporary pagans. Both revival attempts collapsed among widespread concern regarding unclear goals and lack of transparency.
