= Post Carbon Institute =

American-based nonprofit organization

- Founded: 2003
- Founder: Julian Darley and Celine Rich
- Tax ID no.: 65-1208462
- Location: Corvallis, Oregon, United States
- Key people: Asher Miller, Executive Director; Jason Bradford, Board President; Richard Heinberg, Senior Fellow
- Revenue: $1,051,861 (2017)
- Expenses: $712,871 (2017)
- Website: www.postcarbon.org

Post Carbon Institute (PCI) is a 501(c)(3) non-profit organization based in Corvallis, Oregon, focused on sustainability. Specializing in fossil fuels, renewable energy, food, water, and population, it produces a range of media, such as books, podcasts, and reports. It favors post-growth and degrowth solutions to crises it considers interlinked, such as climate change, ecological degradation, wealth inequality, and the world's deep-rooted reliance on fossil fuels. Post Carbon Institute also publishes Resilience.org, an online publication dedicated to "five broad categories: Energy, Economy, Environment, Food & Water, Society." Resilience frequently publishes articles on electoral democracy, Indigenous practices, restoration efforts, community resilience, and eco-socialism, among other topics.

== History ==
Post Carbon Institute (PCI) was founded by Julian Darley and Celine Rich in 2003. It released the film called "The End of Suburbia."

PCI has promoted the concept of relocalization, a strategy to build community resilience based on the local production of food, energy, and goods, as well as the development of more localized governance, economy, and culture.

The group also promoted the concept of peak oil, along with groups such as the International Forum on Globalization, the Transition Towns movement, and websites such as EnergyBulletin and The Oil Drum. PCI also operated an online network focused on community responses to peak oil and climate change called the Relocalization Network.

Asher Miller became Executive Director in 2009, and PCI restructured to concentrate its program activities on research and publishing. It broadened its focus to include natural resource depletion, climate change, economic growth, and human overpopulation.

Most of its earlier programs were consolidated or discontinued, and it entered into partnerships with Transition US and EnergyBulletin. PCI Fellows include Bill McKibben, Wes Jackson, David Orr, and Majora Carter.

== resilience ==
Resilience is an online publication formed by the Post Carbon Institute. It publishes articles, research, and analyses on geopolitics, ecology, economic systems, environmental health and justice, and more, describing its mission as promoting "community resilience in a world of multiple emerging challenges." Managing editor is journalist Shantal Otchere. Submissions from the public are accepted.

Resilience has produced six podcasts: "Crazy Town," "Human Nature Odyssey," "In the Rising Tide," "Holding Fire," and "Richard Heinberg on Power." All are focused on systems theory and resilience. Resilience also offers a free online course, "Think Resilience," which focuses on explaining the climate crisis and community-centered climate mitigation.

Resilience also hosts live events to discuss topics like the bioregional economy, the value of forests, and the global effects following the closure of the Strait of Hormuz.

== See also ==
- Community Resilience
- Peak oil
- Resource depletion
- Transition Towns
- Climate change mitigation
