= Green Illusions =

2012 book by Ozzie Zehner

- ISBN: 978-0-8032-3775-9

Green Illusions: The Dirty Secrets of Clean Energy and the Future of Environmentalism (ISBN 978-0-8032-3775-9), by Ozzie Zehner, was published in 2012 by the University of Nebraska Press. It discusses various approaches to "clean energy", and why they do not provide the desired benefits. The author writes: "We don’t have an energy crisis. We have a consumption crisis." Green Illusions argues that perceived solutions to climate change, such as solar cells, wind turbines, and electric cars, are better understood as illusions that people and groups use to convince themselves that they can be sustainable without reducing material consumption and overall human numbers over time, especially in wealthy countries.

The book generated significant controversy upon its publication leading to sections being censored in the United States and resulting in death threats to the author. However, the book was chosen by Goodreads users as a top-ten non-fiction book. It also won the Northern California Book Award and Nautilus Book Award. In 2019, the author co-produced a film on the subject entitled, Planet of the Humans.

Green Illusions is broken into two distinct parts. Part I is a current history and investigation into why people believe renewable energy technologies will benefit humanity and the planet, and why that belief system is highly suspect and even detrimental despite the fact that fossil fuels yield negative consequences as well. Part II proposes several dozen first steps as alternatives to alternative energy, which the author sees as holding greater potential for addressing environmental challenges. In successive chapters, it discusses solar cells, wind power, biofuels, nuclear power, hydrogen power, coal power, hydropower, alternative energy, green investment, population control, consumption, architecture, carbon taxes, and environmental education.

All copies of the book sold in the United States were self-censored due to food libel laws that enable the food industry to sue journalists and authors who criticize their products.

== Criticism ==
Writing in the Huffington Post, Tom Zeller Jr. calls the author a provocateur. He cites Chris Meehan, who called his view of photovoltaics "alarmist" and "misleading", and he cites Nick Chambers, who called his view of electric vehicles "ridiculous". However, Zeller writes that Zehner cites a "2010 lifecycle analysis" by the National Academy of Sciences as a basis for evaluating the "aggregate environmental damage" from an electric car.

Writing for The Tyee, Justin Ritchie points to a fundamental question: "in a world of limited decisions, is it really smart to subsidize marginally effective mitigation strategies of our car culture, suburbia and overpopulation without addressing the root causes?"

== See also ==
- Big Coal: The Dirty Secret Behind America's Energy Future (2006 book)
- Fossil-fuel phase-out
