= Ozzie Zehner =

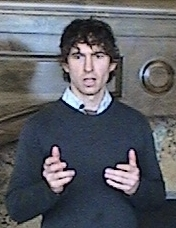
- Education: Kettering University (BS); University of Amsterdam (MS, Drs)
- Notable work: Green Illusions (2012); Planet of the Humans (2019)
- Website: ozziezehner.com

Ozzie Zehner is an author and visiting scholar. He was the author of Green Illusions: The Dirty Secrets of Clean Energy and the Future of Environmentalism, and co-producer of the 2019 environmental documentary Planet of the Humans. He grew up in Kalamazoo, Michigan, and is a graduate of Kettering University and the University of Amsterdam.

In an article published in the Bangor Daily News, Mark W. Anderson discusses Ozzie Zehner's critique of conventional perceptions about environmentalists and clean energy. Zehner's perspective emphasizes the adverse consequences associated with what is often considered "clean energy." Zehner underscores that achieving a sustainable future demands more than a simple transition from fossil fuels to clean energy sources, describing this shift as illusory. Furthermore, Zehner asserts that the challenges related to energy are predominantly rooted in cultural factors rather than technological limitations.

Writing in IEEE Spectrum, Zehner suggests that instead of solely focusing on measuring carbon dioxide emissions, it may be valuable to broaden our perspective. He proposes an examination of the benefits of electric cars in comparison to walkable neighborhoods and the trade-offs between increasing energy generation and the advantages of energy conservation. This perspective encourages a more comprehensive assessment of sustainable practices.

Planet of the Humans, which Zehner was featured in and co-produced, has been criticized for its lack of factual accuracy.
