= What a Way to Go: Life at the End of Empire =

2007 documentary film

What A Way To Go: Life at the End of Empire
- Directed by: Timothy S. Bennett
- Written by: Timothy S. Bennett
- Produced by: Sally Erickson
- Starring: Thomas Berry, William Catton, Gerald Cecil, Douglas Crawford-Brown, Sally Erickson, Lyle Estill, Chellis Glendinning, Otis Graham, Richard Heinberg, Derrick Jensen, Jerry Mander, Richard Manning, Stuart Pimm, Ran Prieur, Daniel Quinn, Paul Roberts, William Schlesinger
- Narrated by: Timothy S. Bennett
- Music by: Original score by Chamber Corps (Chris Rossi and James Hepler) “Let’s Build a Boat” Written and Performed by Brian Hall
- Distributed by: VisionQuest Pictures
- Release date: 2007
- Running time: 123 min
- Country: United States
- Language: English

What a Way to Go: Life at the End of Empire is a 2007 documentary film written, directed and narrated by Timothy S. Bennett, that examines the unsustainability of modern industrial civilization.

The film follows Bennett's personal journey from a complacent middle-class upbringing, shaped by the post-WWII prosperity and consumerism, to an awareness of impending societal collapse driven by interconnected ecological crises, including peak oil, climate change and the effects of global warming, population overshoot and species extinction.

The documentary features data and interviews with experts such as author Daniel Quinn, environmental activist Derrick Jensen and academics such as Richard Heinberg and many others.

The film frames these crises as symptoms of a deeper problem: a "culture of Empire", a mindset that promotes unsustainable growth disconnected from the Earth’s limits.

== Critical reception ==
It received generally positive reception from audiences within environmental and peak oil awareness communities, though it garnered limited attention from mainstream critics.

On IMDb, it holds a solid user rating of around 7.7/10, with viewers praising its depth, personal narrative, and unflinching exploration of interconnected crises, often calling it one of the most important films on these topics despite its grim tone.

== See also ==
- Holocene extinction
- Extinction debt
