= Community resilience =

Concept in crisis management

Community resilience is the sustained ability of a community to use available resources (energy, communication, transportation, food, etc.) to respond to, withstand, and recover from adverse situations (e.g. economic collapse to global catastrophic risks). This allows for the adaptation and growth of a community after disaster strikes. Communities that are resilient are able to minimize any disaster, making the return to normal life as effortless as possible. By implementing a community resilience plan, a community can come together and overcome any disaster, while rebuilding physically and economically.

Due to its high complexity the discussion on resilient societies has increasingly been considered from an inter- and transdisciplinary scope.

Around 2010 the French-speaking discourse coined the notion of collapsology (collapse science), discussing the resilience of societal systems and possible scenarios for societal transformations in the face of a variety of factors, such as dependence on fossil fuels, overpopulation, loss of biodiversity, and instability of the financial system. The controversial term was created by Pablo Servigne (an agricultural engineer) who, with Raphaël Stevens, wrote the book Comment tout peut s'effondrer (literally, "How everything can collapse"). Another, decidedly transdisciplinary approach which has been coined in late 2010s by German researcher Karim Fathi is the concept of "multiresilience" taking into account the fact that crises in the 21st century are interconnected, multi-dimensional and occurring on multiple system levels. Challenges such as the COVID-19 pandemic (individuals, organisations, societies alike) occur simultaneously, often even in interconnected and clustered forms. From a cross-disciplinary perspective, Karim Fathi outlines five systemic principles contributing to increased collective intelligence, responsiveness and creativity of societies in the face of multiple crises occurring simultaneously. Multiresilience is regarded as complementary to already established concepts for assessing and promoting societal resilience potentials. At the same time it criticises the fact that societal resilience has so far always been discussed from a mono-crisis perspective. According to Karim Fathi, this one-sided perspective proves to be inadequate in terms of complexity, as societies in the 21st century have to deal with many global challenges - so-called "crisis-bundles“ - in the same time. Multiresilience aims to build up "basic robustness" in the sense of higher collective intelligence, which makes societies more capable of anticipating, reacting and solving problems in different crisis contexts

== Community resilience planning ==
A community resilience plan is an action plan that allows for a community to rebuild after disaster. The plan should entail specific guidelines that will aid the community to rebuild both the economy and the ecosystem that the community thrives on. This typically means there are measures in place that a community will follow, such as the distribution of volunteers, and the access to knowledge and resources necessary to rebuild. Adaptability is a key attribute which means prevention can occur in response or before disaster strikes. The National Institute of Standards and Technology has a Community Resilience department tasked with solving this problem. This agency has created a Community Resilience Planning Guide, and its aim is to assist communities with anticipating challenges through a practical application that takes into account the social needs of the community as well as dependencies on the "built environment" - buildings and infrastructure systems. The outline of the six step process is shown below:

- Six-step process
  1. Form a collaborative planning team
  2. Understand the situation
  3. Determine the goals and objectives
  4. Plan development
  5. Plan preparation, review, and approval
  6. Plan implementation and maintenance

== Classification of hazards ==
The scope of community resilience extends beyond natural disasters and include manmade events. Below are an example of disasters communities face on a daily basis:

1. Wind (hurricane, tornados)
2. Earthquake (landslides, liquefaction)
3. Inundation (flooding, coastal erosion)
4. Fire (natural, manmade)
5. Snow or rain (blizzards, tsunami)
6. Technological or human-caused (cyberwarfare, nuclear weapons)
- Routine

Hazard events that occur regularly and are typically less consequential events in terms of damage and recovery.

- Design

Hazard events that structures must be designed to withstand and often includes many natural disasters.

- Extreme

Hazard events may also found in building codes for some hazards; however, they are likely to cause significant and often irreparable damage.

== Dependencies and cascading failures ==
Infrastructure systems such as buildings, water, electric power, transportation, and communication are all interconnected and interdependent networks or systems. This means that a failure in one network can have catastrophic impact on another system. When Hurricane Katrina hit New Orleans, LA on August 23, 2005, it caused network outages in transportation and power networks which led to system failure and impedance in others such communication and emergency services.

== For specific issues ==
=== Climate change ===
Climate resilience is a concept to describe how well people or ecosystems are prepared to bounce back from certain climate hazard events. The formal definition of the term is the "capacity of social, economic and ecosystems to cope with a hazardous event or trend or disturbance". For example, climate resilience can be the ability to recover from climate-related shocks such as floods and droughts. Different actions can increase climate resilience of communities and ecosystems to help them cope. They can help to keep systems working in the face of external forces. For example, building a seawall to protect a coastal community from flooding might help maintain existing ways of life there.

To increase climate resilience means one has to reduce the climate vulnerability of people, communities and countries. This can be done in many different ways. They can be technological and infrastructural changes (including buildings and roads) or policy (e.g. laws and regulation). There are also social and community approaches, as well as nature-based ones, for example by restoring ecosystems like forests to act as natural barriers against climate impacts. These types of approaches are also known as climate change adaptation. Climate resilience is a broader concept that includes adaptation but also emphasizes a system-wide approach to managing risks. The changes have to be implemented at all scales of society, from local community action all the way to global treaties. It also emphasizes the need to transform systems and societies and to better cope with a changed climate.

To make societies more resilient, climate policies and plans should be shaped by choices that support sustainability. This kind of development has come to be known as climate resilient development. It has become a new paradigm for sustainable development. It influences theory and practice across all sectors globally. Two approaches that fall under this kind of development are climate resilient infrastructure and climate-smart agriculture. Another example are climate-resilient water services. These are services that provide access to high quality drinking water during all seasons and even during extreme weather events. On every continent, governments are now adopting policies for climate resilient economies. International frameworks such as the Paris Agreement and the Sustainable Development Goals are drivers for such initiatives.

Tools exist to measure climate resilience. They allow for comparisons of different groups of people through standardized metrics. Objective tools use fixed and transparent definitions of resilience. Two examples for objective tools are the Resilience Index Measurement and Analysis (RIMA) and the Livelihoods Change Over Time (LCOT). Subjective approaches on the other hand use people's feelings of what constitutes resilience. People then make their own assessment of their resilience.

== See also ==
- Human-powered transport – Transport of goods and/or people only using human muscles
- Resilience (organizational)
- Societal collapse
