= Twilight's Last Gleaming (novel) =

2014 book by John Michael Greer

- First edition
- Author: John Michael Greer
- Language: English
- Genre: Speculative fiction, Political fiction
- Published: 2014
- Publisher: Karnac Books
- Publication place: United States
- Pages: 400
- ISBN: 9781782200352

Twilight's Last Gleaming is a 2014 novel by John Michael Greer. The novel is a work of speculative political fiction, in which a declining United States attempts to gain control of some desperately needed oil by overthrowing the government of Tanzania. This prompts an intervention by Tanzania's ally, the People's Republic of China, with disastrous consequences for the United States.

== Plot ==
In the year 2024, significant oil reserves are discovered in the Indian Ocean, in Tanzanian territorial waters. The following year, U.S. President Jameson Weed and his staff meet in the White House. The United States of the year 2025 is suffering from a long period of economic stagnation, exacerbated by the effects of peak oil and global warming. Weed's plan to take control of the Tanzanian oil gets support from Vice President Leonard Gurney, a political hack, and from National Security Adviser Ellen Harbin, a hawkish neocon, but is opposed by Secretary of Defense Bill Stedman, who believes the plan is asking for trouble. Overconfident and unable to conceive of an American military defeat, the Weed administration decides to launch a regime-change operation, including threats, bribery attempts, paid rioters, and accusations that Tanzania is a ruthless dictatorship. Meanwhile, the President of Tanzania, refusing to yield his country's new-found wealth, and knowing that the United States has a history of fighting for oil, appeals to his country's ally, China, for protection.

The members of the Chinese government's inner circle, knowing that they have reached military parity with the declining United States, follow a brilliant Chinese professor's plan to help China's client state while delivering a blow to American military prestige, and they receive eager assistance from America's numerous enemies and victims. China is able to keep its plan secret, and thus the American forces are taken by surprise when they launch the invasion in July 2025. The Chinese disable the American satellite network through a cyberattack, severely hampering American command and control, then launch hundreds of high-speed computer-guided cruise missiles which they had smuggled unobserved into Tanzania. The American fleet is not prepared to defend itself against this new generation of missiles. The Americans shoot down many of them, but as one missile after another finds its way through the ships' air defenses, the fleet is devastated: most of the ships, including the aircraft carrier USS Ronald Reagan, are either sunk or disabled.

Meanwhile, the Army and Air Force launch a land invasion from Kenya, the only remaining American client state in the region. The unexpected arrival of PLAAF aircraft (transported covertly via Russia and Iran) forces the Americans on the defensive. The American F-35 fighters, were selected for their ability to produce profits for their politically connected manufacturers rather than their efficacy in combat and they are even referred to as 'Lardbuckets' by both their pilots and ground crews; as a result, the Chinese military is able to gain air supremacy. Tanzania and several other African nations declare war on Kenya. The international press chronicles the fighting (reporters from Australia and the United Arab Emirates play a prominent role) but the Weed administration tries to keep the news out of American newspapers. As the Chinese strategists had anticipated, the Americans are unable to imagine that they might actually be defeated, and therefore double down on their existing military strategy, further depleting American reserves and matériel.

The Chinese and their African allies drive the American and Kenyan forces back into Kenya. With so many ships and aircraft already lost, the Americans cannot easily resupply their land forces. The Weed administration escalates the conflict by attacking a Chinese military base directly. Aghast, Stedman resigns as Secretary of Defense. The Chinese retaliate by launching a surprise airborne attack on the American base at Diego Garcia, taking control of the island. By September, the government of Kenya has fallen, and the American forces are trapped and must surrender. Iran, with promises of a quid pro quo from the Chinese for stirring up trouble, launches an invasion of Saudi Arabia, and the Americans are powerless to intervene.

Weed escalates the situation further, threatening a limited tactical nuclear strike on the Chinese. The President of Russia responds by promising an all-out nuclear war if the United States acts on its threat. A potentially cataclysmic nuclear crisis unfolds. When local authorities fire on panicked civilians trying to flee the city of Trenton, New Jersey, several other states (led by Texas) openly defy the federal government, implementing their own plans for surviving the crisis, including the possibility of secession. Seeing his own government crumbling and no sign of concessions from Russia or China, Weed finally backs down and sues for peace.

Although the terms of the peace treaty only required the United States to accept the loss of Kenya and Diego Garcia, the defeat and the ongoing war between Iran and Saudi Arabia cause the price of imported oil, already high, to skyrocket, and the United States faces an energy crisis. Knowing that his navy is obsolete and U.S. troops in the Persian Gulf are vulnerable, Weed evacuates them, effectively shutting U.S. power and influence out of Africa, the Middle East, and the Indian Ocean. As investors around the world realize that the United States is no longer a hyperpower, they begin selling U.S. dollar-denominated investments, causing the dollar to fall sharply. This leads to high inflation and a major economic crisis in the United States. The problem becomes worse when several large investment banks, who had taken unhedged risks that had been intended to pay off when the United States won the war, become insolvent. With the dollar in free fall, the federal government cannot bail out the banks without risking a total collapse of the dollar, and so banks go bankrupt, and the United States enters an economic depression. Weed resigns the presidency and commits suicide.

The new president, Gurney, inherits Weed's cabinet, including Harbin, with whom he has begun an extramarital affair. He appoints Senator Pete Bridgeport as his new vice president, as an incentive to protect the administration from congressional hearings on the military misadventure that had ruined the country. The hearings proceed anyway. Gurney's recovery plan involves a grandiose rearmament project that the United States can no longer afford, and a domestic spending plan based almost entirely on unfunded mandates. The plan is universally condemned by the states and the people, and the state government of Arkansas passes a resolution calling for a constitutional convention to ban unfunded mandates.

Harbin, trying to protect the administration, arranges to have Stedman, the former Secretary of Defense, assassinated to prevent him from testifying before Congress. However, Stedman had been aware of this possibility, leaving instructions for his computer-whiz grandson to leak his documents in case anything happens to him. The government falls into a crisis of legitimacy, with anti-government rhetoric and donations to extremist political parties reaching new records. Other states join the call for a constitutional convention, and the convention opens in September 2026 in St. Louis, Missouri.

At the convention, a resolution calling for a constitutional amendment to ban unfunded mandates passes easily, but the delegates cannot agree on anything else. After several weeks of deadlock, a proposal to outright dissolve the United States of America surfaces. The shocked delegates pass the resolution, and the convention closes.

In Washington, Gurney and Harbin draw up plans to avert dissolution by means of a military coup, drawing up a long list of people to be purged, including Bridgeport and many other high-ranking government and military officials. The crisis comes to a head in October when Stedman's grandson, still hacking government computers, discovers the plot and leaks it, alerting Bridgeport. As president of the Senate, Vice President Bridgeport asks the Chairman of the Joint Chiefs of Staff for military protection, and convenes an emergency meeting of Congress. Gurney is impeached, convicted, and removed from office in one day. Gurney flees the country and is killed by unknown assailants in Brazil, while Harbin is imprisoned.

Bridgeport becomes President, and although he enjoys personal popularity and a reputation for honesty, he cannot overcome the near-universal perception that the American government is broken beyond repair. As the dollar has lost more than 90% of its value over the past year, Bridgeport recalls all American troops home from overseas, and tries to work with Congress to balance the budget with tax revenues a tiny fraction of what they had been before the war. It is too little, too late, however; numerous states begin to ratify the dissolution amendment, starting with South Carolina. In January 2027, Nebraska becomes the thirty-eighth state to ratify, and the United States of America officially ceases to exist.

In the following weeks, the states begin to arrange themselves into a number of successor states. In Washington, Bridgeport and other former government officials contemplate founding a rump United States out of states that voted against ratification, based in the Rust Belt and Mid-Atlantic regions.

== Interpretation ==
Twilight Last Gleaming reflects Greer's overall pessimistic views about the future of the United States and industrial civilization. Elsewhere he says:

Under the illusion of invincibility we still tell ourselves that 'this time it's different' but as we shall soon discover, forces far beyond our control have other ideas.

== Speculations about the years 2024–25 ==
Some of the speculations that Greer made in this novel:

- The United States remained dependent on imported oil. All attempts to reduce this dependence, including domestic fracking, biodiesel, solar power and others, had either failed or remained economically unfeasible. Peak oil is a common theme of Greer's work.
- The United States had participated in wars in Ukraine and Venezuela in the years before the novel is set.
- Tanzania had become an oil exporter before the discovery of the offshore oil field. In 2015, Tanzania was not a significant oil producer.
- India is still a nuclear state, but Pakistan is not, implying that Pakistan disarmed at some point.
- India and Brazil have been granted permanent seats on a reformed United Nations Security Council.
- Prince William, Duke of Cambridge had become King of the United Kingdom. In 2015, William was second in line to the throne after his father, Prince Charles.
- The military operation, Blazing Torch, was supposedly named after the national flag of Tanzania. This design was actually based on the flag of Zaire (now the Democratic Republic of the Congo), not Tanzania. This implies that the president's staffers were so overconfident or ignorant that they could not even name their plans right, although this is not addressed in the novel.
- The president of Russia bore a personal grudge against the United States, blaming it for his father's suicide during the American-instigated Russian economic depression of the 1990s.
- Automation is mentioned briefly, but mass technological unemployment has not occurred.
- The distinction between America's major political parties is portrayed as irrelevant. None of the major politicians' political affiliations are ever specified.

== Production ==
Greer published a short version of this story on his blog, the Archdruid Report, in October 2012.
