= John Michael Greer =

American writer and druid (born 1962)

- Born: 1962 (age 63–64); Bremerton, Washington, U.S.
- Occupations: Writer; blogger

John Michael Greer (born 1962) is an American writer and druid who writes on religious, environmentalist, and occult topics.

== Early life and education ==
Greer was born in Bremerton, Washington and was raised in the Seattle area. He is an initiate in Freemasonry and the Hermetic Order of the Golden Dawn.

== Writing ==
In a 2005 abstract, called How Civilizations Fall: A Theory of Catabolic Collapse, he wrote an ecological model of collapse in which production fails to meet maintenance requirements for existing capital. Philosopher of science Jerome Ravetz summarized Greer's theory in his 2006 book chapter, titled "When Communication Fails: A Study of Failures of Global Systems." Ravetz wrote:

A simple but powerful model of 'catabolic collapse', a self-reinforcing cycle of contraction converting most capital to waste, has been produced by John Michael Greer (Greer 2005). His activity in the 'contemporary nature spirituality movement' in Oregon has not prevented him from producing a model in the best economic style. His key variables are resources, capital, waste and production; crisis occurs when production fails to meet maintenance requirements for existing capital. The continuing degradation of the infrastructure, particularly in the USA, provides evidence for his approach. He claims that he can account for key features of historical collapse, and suggests parallels between successional processes in non-human ecosystems and collapse phenomena in human societies.

In The King in Orange (2021), Greer analyses the contemporary American political landscape through class analysis and occult practices. Focusing on the election and opposition to Donald Trump as president of the United States, Greer predicts a continuing combination of magic and politics from the various class factions of the country. He criticised the public magical workings of liberal occultists, arguing that political magic should be kept secret to prevent opposing magicians from tampering with the working.

Greer has written many novels, including a series of eleven fantasy novels based on the worlds created by H.P. Lovecraft and his Cthulhu Mythos entitled "The Weird of Hali".

== Reception ==
Writing in The Futurist magazine, Rick Docksai declared that Greer's book The Ecotechnic Future is "as realistic a portrayal of the end of civilization as one is likely to find." It was also positively reviewed in Choice: Current Reviews for Academic Libraries and was recommended in the industry journal Energy Policy. The International Journal of Agricultural Sustainability referred to his book The Wealth of Nature as "challeng[ing] the paradigms that underlie the complex system of wealth distribution we know as economics."

His book The New Encyclopedia of the Occult was selected as a reference text in 2005 by American Libraries and noted by Booklist and Publishers Weekly.

== Works ==
=== Spirituality and the occult ===
- Circles of Power: An Introduction to Hermetic Magic. Llewellyn. 1997. ISBN 978-1-56718-313-9.
- Inside a Magical Lodge: Group Ritual in the Western Tradition. Llewellyn. 1998. ISBN 978-1-56718-314-6.
- Monsters: An Investigator's Guide to Magical Beings. Llewellyn. 2001. ISBN 978-0-7387-0050-2.
- The New Encyclopedia of the Occult. Llewellyn. 2003. ISBN 978-1-56718-336-8.
- Encyclopedia of Natural Magic. Llewellyn. 2005. ISBN 978-0-7387-0674-0.
- A World Full of Gods: An Inquiry into Polytheism. ADF Publishing. 2005. ISBN 978-0-9765681-0-0.
- The Druidry Handbook: Spiritual Practice Rooted in the Living Earth. Weiser. 2006. ISBN 978-1-57863-354-8.
- The Element Encyclopedia of Secret Societies: The Ultimate A–Z of Ancient Mysteries, Lost Civilizations and Forgotten Wisdom. HarperElement. 2006. ISBN 978-0-00-722068-7.
- Atlantis: Ancient Legacy, Hidden Prophecy. Llewellyn. 2007. ISBN 978-0-7387-0978-9.
- Paths of Wisdom: Cabala in the Golden Dawn Tradition. Thoth Publications. 2007. ISBN 978-1-913660-07-9.
- The Druid Magic Handbook: Ritual Magic Rooted in the Living Earth. Weiser. 2008. ISBN 978-1-57863-397-5.
- The Art and Practice of Geomancy: Divination, Magic, and Earth Wisdom of the Renaissance. Weiser. 2009. ISBN 978-1-57863-431-6.
- Secrets of the Lost Symbol: The Unauthorized Guide to Secret Societies, Hidden Symbols & Mysticism. Llewellyn. 2009. ISBN 978-0-7387-2169-9.
- The UFO Phenomenon: Fact, Fantasy and Disinformation. Llewellyn. 2009. ISBN 978-0-7387-1319-9.
- Apocalypse Not: Everything You Know about 2012, Nostradamus and the Rapture Is Wrong. Start Publishing. 2011. ISBN 978-1-936740-00-0.
- The Druid Revival Reader. Lorian Association. 2011. ISBN 978-0-9837422-0-3.
- Apocalypse: A History of the End of Time. Quercus. 2012. ISBN 978-1-78087-040-3.
- The Blood of the Earth: An Essay on Magic and Peak Oil. Bibliotheque Rouge. 2012. ISBN 978-0-9567203-8-2.
- Mystery Teachings From the Living Earth: An Introduction to Spiritual Ecology. Weiser. 2012. ISBN 978-1-57863-489-7.
- The Celtic Golden Dawn: An Original & Complete Curriculum of Druidical Study. Llewellyn. 2013. ISBN 978-0-7387-3155-1.
- The Gnostic Celtic Church: A Manual and Book of Liturgy. Lorian Association. 2013. ISBN 978-1-939790-05-7.
- The Secret of the Temple: Earth Energies, Sacred Geometry, and the Lost Keys of Freemasonry. Llewellyn. 2016. ISBN 978-0-7387-4860-3.
- The Coelbren Alphabet: The Forgotten Oracle of the Welsh Bards. Llewellyn. 2017. ISBN 978-0-7387-5088-0.
- The Occult Book: A Chronological Journey from Alchemy to Wicca. Sterling. 2017. ISBN 978-1-4549-2577-4.
- The Conspiracy Book: A Chronological Journey through Secret Societies and Hidden Histories. Sterling. 2019. ISBN 978-1-4549-3004-4.
- A Magical Education: Talks on Magic and Occultism. Aeon Books. 2019. ISBN 978-1-912807-02-4.
- Beyond the Narratives: Essays on Occultism and the Future. Aeon Books. 2020. ISBN 978-1-912807-59-8.
- The Mysteries of Merlin: Ceremonial Magic for the Druid Path. Llewellyn. 2020. ISBN 978-0-7387-5949-4.
- The UFO Chronicles: How Science Fiction, Shamanic Experiences, and Secret Air Force Projects Created the UFO Myth. Aeon Books. 2020. ISBN 978-1-912807-89-5.
- The King in Orange: The Magical and Occult Roots of Political Power. Inner Traditions. 2021. ISBN 978-1-64411-258-8.
- The Sacred Geometry Oracle: Book and Card Deck. Aeon Books. 2021. ISBN 978-1-912807-19-2.

=== Economics and politics ===
- The Long Descent: A User's Guide to the End of the Industrial Age. New Society Publishers. 2008. ISBN 978-0-86571-609-4.
- The Ecotechnic Future: Envisioning a Post-Peak World. New Society Publishers. 2009. ISBN 978-0-86571-639-1.
- The Wealth of Nature: Economics As If Survival Mattered. New Society Publishers. 2011. ISBN 978-0-86571-673-5.
- Green Wizardry: Conservation, Solar Power, Organic Gardening, and Other Hands-on Skills from the Appropriate Tech Toolkit. New Society Publishers. 2013. ISBN 978-0-86571-747-3.
- Not the Future we Ordered: Peak Oil, Psychology and the Myth of Progress. Karnac Books. 2013. ISBN 978-1-78049-088-5.
- Decline and Fall: the End of Empire and the Future of Democracy in the 21st Century. New Society Publishers. 2014. ISBN 978-0-86571-764-0.
- After Progress: Reason and Religion at the End of the Industrial Age Paperback. New Society Publishers. 2015. ISBN 978-0-86571-791-6.
- Collapse Now and Avoid the Rush: the Best of the Archdruid Report. Founders House Publishing. 2015. ISBN 978-0-692-38945-4.
- Dark Age America: Climate Change, Cultural Collapse, and the Hard Future Ahead. New Society Publishers. 2016. ISBN 978-0-86571-833-3.
- The Retro Future: Looking to the Past to Remake the Future. New Society Publishers. 2017. ISBN 978-0-86571-866-1.

=== Fiction ===
- The Fires of Shalsha. Lorian Association. 2009. ISBN 978-0-9791700-5-8.
- Star's Reach: A Novel of the Deindustrial Future. Founders House. 2014. ISBN 978-0-9843764-7-6.
- Twilight's Last Gleaming. Karnac Books. 2014. ISBN 978-1-78220-035-2.
- Retrotopia. Founders House. 2016. ISBN 978-1-945810-02-2.
- An Archdruid's Tales: Fiction From The Archdruid Report. Founders House Publishing. 2017. ISBN 978-1-945810-06-0.
- The Shoggoth Concerto. Founders House Publishing. 2019. ISBN 978-1-945810-32-9.
- The Nyogtha Variations. Founders House Publishing. 2020. ISBN 978-1-945810-41-1.
- The Seal of Yueh Lao. Founders House Publishing. 2020. ISBN 978-1-945810-47-3.
- A Voyage to Hyperborea. Founders House Publishing. 2020. ISBN 978-1-945810-44-2.

==== The Weird of Hali series ====
- The Weird of Hali: Innsmouth. Vol. 1. Founders House Publishing. 2018. ISBN 978-1-945810-24-4.
- The Weird of Hali: Kingsport. Vol. 2. Founders House Publishing. 2018. ISBN 978-1-945810-25-1.
- The Weird of Hali: Chorazin. Vol. 3. Founders House Publishing. 2019. ISBN 978-1-945810-29-9.
- The Weird of Hali: Dreamlands. Vol. 4. Founders House Publishing. 2019. ISBN 978-1-945810-30-5.
- The Weird of Hali: Providence. Vol. 5. Founders House Publishing. 2019. ISBN 978-1-945810-31-2.
- The Weird of Hali: Red Hook. Vol. 6. Founders House Publishing. 2019. ISBN 978-1-945810-35-0.
- The Weird of Hali: Arkham. Vol. 7. Founders House Publishing. 2019. ISBN 978-1-945810-39-8.
- The Weird of Hali Companion. Founders House Publishing. 2021. ISBN 978-1-945810-53-4.

=== Anthologies edited ===
- After Oil: SF Visions of a Post-Petroleum World. Founders House. 2012.
- After Oil 2: The Years of Crisis. Founders House. 2014.
- After Oil 3: The Years of Rebirth. Founders House. 2015.
- After Oil 4: The Future's Distant Shores. Founders House. 2016.
- Merigan Tales: Stories for the World of Star's Reach. Founders House. 2016.
