= Carl L. Weschcke =

American publisher (1930–2015)

Carl Llewellyn Weschcke (Note: born Carl Louis Weschcke) (September 10, 1930 – November 7, 2015) was an American publisher and the president/owner of Llewellyn Worldwide (formerly Llewellyn Publications) from 1961 until his death. He received nationwide media attention when he bought the supposedly haunted Summit Avenue Mansion in St. Paul, Minnesota in 1964, and claimed to have "numerous odd experiences" there.

Born in St. Paul, Weschcke bought Llewellyn Publications in early 1961 when he was president of Chester-Kent, Inc. In 1970, Weschcke opened the Gnostica Bookstore in Minneapolis, as well as the "Gnostica School for Self-Development", based on Gnostic teachings. He also began the Gnostic Aquarian Festivals in Minneapolis, also known as Gnosticon during the 1970s, which helped fuel the rise in awareness of occult and metaphysical teachings.

Weschcke was elected president of the NAACP's Minnesota branch in 1959 and vice president of the ACLU's Minnesota branch in 1965.

== General references ==
- Rosemary Ellen Guiley, The Encyclopedia of Witches &Witchcraft
- Raven Grimassi, Encyclopedia of Wicca & Witchcraft
- George Knowles, "Carl Weschcke", "Controverscial.Com"
