= Praslin Power Station =

Diesel-fuelled power plant in Baie Saint Anne, Seychelles

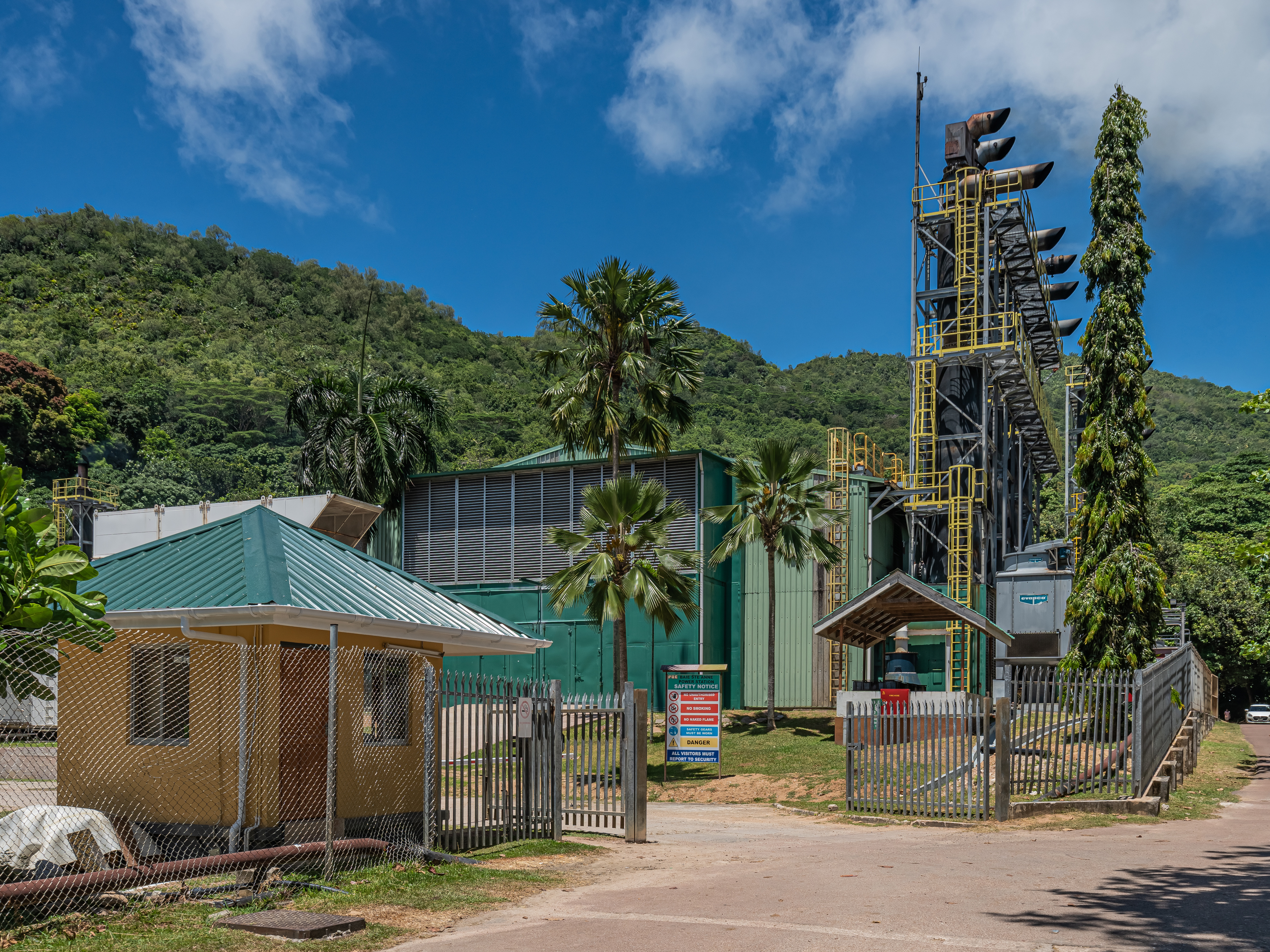
- Country: Seychelles
- Location: Baie Saint Anne
- Coordinates: 4°20′23.2″S 55°45′22.7″E
- Status: Operational
- Commission date: 1980

Power generation
- Nameplate capacity: 13 MW

External links
- Commons: Related media on Commons

The Praslin Power Station or Baie Ste Anne Power Station is a fossil fuel power station in Baie Saint Anne, Seychelles.

== History ==
The power station was commissioned in 1980 with an installed generation capacity of 2.7 MW.

== Technical specifications ==
The power station has an installed generation capacity of 13 MW.

== See also ==
- Energy in Seychelles
