= Wild Earth =

Magazine

Wild Earth was an environmentalist magazine published in the United States by the Wildlands Project between 1991 and 2004. The magazine was based in Richmond, Vermont.

== History and profile ==
Wild Earth came about when the original Earth First!: The Radical Environmental Journal (edited by Foreman during most of the 1980s) ceased publication in late 1990. The founders of Wild Earth were Dave Foreman and John Davis. That publication was associated with the environmental group Earth First!. In 1990, following increasingly acrimonious debate over the direction of Earth First!, the organization split and the original Journal folded. Those who wished to continue activism under the Earth First! name, including anarchists and a west coast faction led by Judi Bari and Mike Roselle, relaunched the Earth First! Journal under their own editorial control. Much of the "old guard" who founded Earth First! in 1980 did not wish to continue under the Earth First! name and launched the magazine, Wild Earth. Wild Earth differed strongly from the Earth First! Journal in that while the latter emphasized direct action and a style rooted in the counterculture, Wild Earth emphasized conservation biology, science, and wilderness proposals, and a style rooted in the conservationism movement. Wild Earth was published quarterly.

At first, Wild Earth was solely a magazine. The publisher was Cenozoic Society, Inc. Later, a new environmental group, the Wildlands Project, was formed and the magazine became the official periodical of the Wildlands Project.

Wild Earth ceased publication in 2004 due to budgetary concerns at the Wildlands Project, as the magazine became increasingly unprofitable to publish and other priorities at the organization were deemed more important than subsidizing a magazine which was no longer profitable.
