= Richard Heinberg =

American journalist and educator (1950–2026)

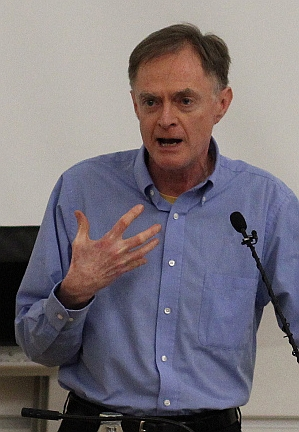
- Heinberg discussing energy at University of Toronto, March 2013
- Born: Richard William Heinberg; October 21, 1950
- Died: July 19, 2026 (aged 75)
- Occupations: Writer, educator, environmentalist
- Spouse: Janet Barocco
- Writing career
- Genre: non-fiction
- Subjects: peak oil, resource depletion, sustainability
- Notable work: The Party's Over: Oil, War, and the Fate of Industrial Societies Powerdown: Options and Actions for a Post-Carbon World
- Website: richardheinberg.com

Richard William Heinberg (October 21, 1950 – July 19, 2026) was an American journalist and educator who wrote on energy, economic and ecological issues, including oil depletion. He was the author of 14 books, and was the senior fellow at the Post Carbon Institute.

== Early life ==
Richard William Heinberg was born on October 21, 1950, and grew up in St. Joseph, Missouri. His father, William Heinberg, was a chemist and high-school physics and chemistry teacher. Heinberg's interest in science came from his father, but at an early age, he rejected his parents' fundamentalist Christian beliefs. At one point he lived at Colorado's Sunrise Ranch, headquarters of the "Emissaries of Divine Light" group, which Heinberg referred to as "a sort of benign cult".

== Career ==
After two years in college, in November 1979 Heinberg became personal assistant to Immanuel Velikovsky. After Velikovsky's death, Heinberg assisted his widow in editing manuscripts. He published his first book in 1989, Memories and Visions of Paradise: Exploring the Universal Myth of a Lost Golden Age. An expanded second edition was published in 1995. He began publishing his alternative newsletter, the MuseLetter, in 1992. His next book – published in 1993 – was Celebrate the Solstice: Honoring the Earth's Seasonal Rhythms through Festival and Ceremony.

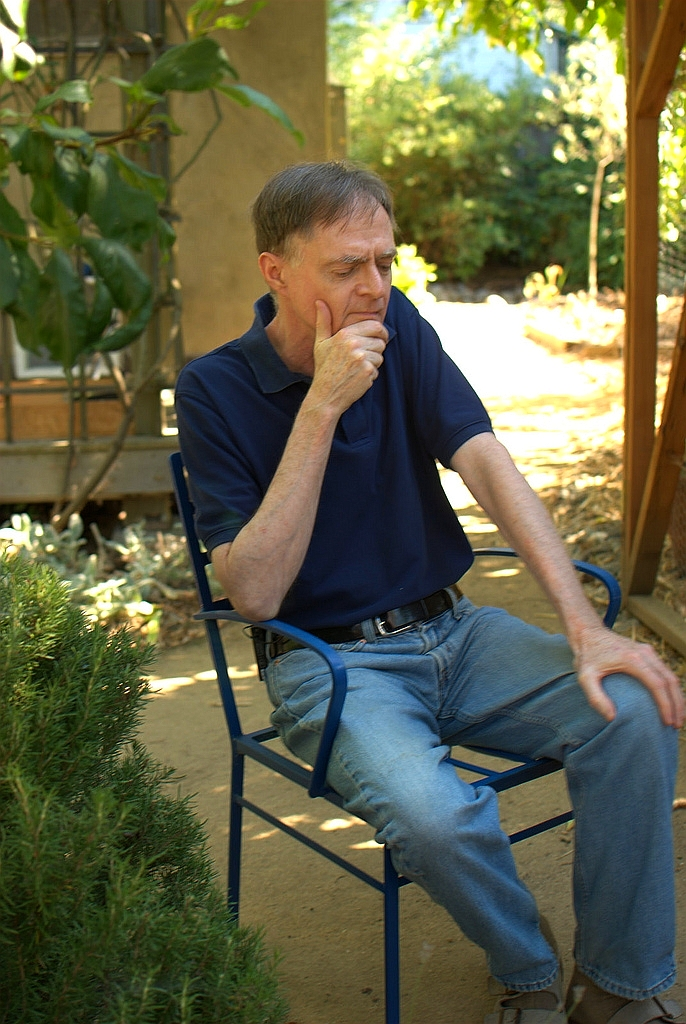
Heinberg in his garden in Santa Rosa, California. August 2011

In February 2007, Heinberg addressed the Committee on International Trade of the European Parliament and served as an advisor to the National Petroleum Council in its report to the U.S. Secretary of Energy on Peak Oil. In October 2007, the Green Party of Aotearoa organised a speaking tour of New Zealand for Heinberg, which included a presentation in the Beehive theatrette within the New Zealand Parliament building. In 2008 he was a Mayor's appointed member of the Oil Independent Oakland 2020 Task Force (Oakland, California), which was convened to chart a path for the city to reduce its petroleum dependence.

Heinberg was the senior fellow of the Post Carbon Institute in Santa Rosa, California.

He proposed an international protocol to peak oil management with the aim of reducing the impact of the arrival of the peak. The adoption of the Protocol would mean that oil-importing nations should deal to reduce their importations in an annual percentage, while exporting countries should deal to reduce their exportations in the same percentage. The Uppsala Protocol has been focused in a similar direction.

Heinberg was the editor of MuseLetter, which has been included in Utne Magazine's annual list of Best Alternative Newsletters. He has appeared in the documentaries Once You Know,The End of Suburbia, The 11th Hour, Crude Impact, Oil, Smoke & Mirrors, Chasing God, What a Way to Go: Life at the End of Empire, The Great Squeeze, The Power of Community: How Cuba Survived Peak Oil, A Farm for the Future and Ripe For Change.

He was on the advisory board of The Climate Mobilization, a grassroots advocacy group calling for a national economic mobilization against climate change on the scale of the home front during World War II, with the goal of 100% clean energy and net zero greenhouse gas emissions by 2025.

== Personal life and death ==
Heinberg was also a violinist and artist. He was married to Janet Barocco.

Heinberg died from pancreatic cancer on July 19, 2026, at the age of 75. Long-time colleagues of his at the Post Carbon Institute and beyond published tributes to him on the Resilience website.

== Books ==
Heinberg's books from the later 1990s address the relationships between humanity and the natural world. In 1998, he began teaching at New College of California in the "Culture, Ecology and Sustainable Community" program, which he helped design. He remained a member of the Core Faculty until 2007, when the College closed its doors. His book The Party's Over: Oil, War, and the Fate of Industrial Societies, published in 2003, was one of the first full-length analyses of peak oil.

In 2004, Heinberg provided the closing address for the First US Conference on Peak Oil and Community Solutions. His title was "Beyond the Peak".

== Publications ==
- Memories and Visions of Paradise: Exploring the Universal Myth of a Lost Golden Age (1989; revised edition, 1995; British edition, 1990; Portuguese edition, 1991)
- Celebrate the Solstice: Honoring the Earth’s Seasonal Rhythms through Festival and Ceremony (1993; Italian edition, 2002; Portuguese edition, 2002)
- A New Covenant with Nature: Notes on the End of Civilization and the Renewal of Culture (1996; Portuguese edition, 1998) ISBN 978-0-8356-0746-9
- Cloning the Buddha: The Moral Impact of Biotechnology (1999; Indian edition, 2001; Japanese edition, 2001; Chinese edition, 2001)
- The Party's Over: Oil, War, and the Fate of Industrial Societies (2003; British, Italian, German, Spanish, and Arabic editions, 2004–2005; revised North American edition, 2005; Spanish edition, 2007; French edition, 2008 German Edition)
- Powerdown: Options and Actions for a Post-Carbon World (ISBN 9780865715103) (2004; British edition 2005)
- The Oil Depletion Protocol: A Plan to Avert Oil Wars, Terrorism and Economic Collapse (2006, ISBN 978-0-86571-563-9),
- Peak Everything: Waking Up to the Century of Declines (2007, ISBN 978-0-86571-598-1).
- Blackout: Coal, Climate, and the Last Energy Crisis (June, 2009). (ISBN 9780865716568)
- The Post Carbon Reader: Managing the 21st Century’s Sustainability Crises, edited by Richard Heinberg & Daniel Lerch (2010) ISBN 978-0-9709500-6-2
- The End of Growth: Adapting to Our New Economic Reality, (2011) ISBN 978-0-86571-695-7
- Snake Oil: How Fracking's False Promise of Plenty Imperils Our Future (2013) ISBN 978-0976751090
- Afterburn: Society Beyond Fossil Fuels (2015) ISBN 978-0865717886
- Our Renewable Future: Laying the Path for One Hundred Percent Clean Energy (2016) ISBN 978-1610917797, co-authored by Richard Heinberg and David Fridley
- Power: Limits and Prospects for Human Survival (2021) ISBN 978-0865719675

== See also ==
- Energy descent
- Oil depletion
- Peak oil
- Petrodollar warfare
