= Llewellyn Worldwide =

American book publishing company

- Founded: 1901
- Founder: Llewellyn George
- Country of origin: United States
- Headquarters location: Woodbury, Minnesota
- Distribution: self-distributed (US); Publishers Group UK (UK); Faradawn (South Africa); Akasha Books & Gifts (New Zealand); Brumby Sunstate (Australia)
- Publication types: Books
- Nonfiction topics: New Age
- Official website: www.llewellyn.com

Llewellyn Worldwide, formerly Llewellyn Publications, is a New Age and occult publisher based in Woodbury, Minnesota. It was founded in 1901 by the astrologer Llewellyn George (1876–1954) in Portland, Oregon, as the Llewellyn Publishing Company.

== History ==
Llewellyn Worldwide was formed in 1901 by the astrologist Llewellyn George (1876–1954) in Portland, Oregon, as the Llewellyn Publishing Company. With it, he founded the Portland School of Astrology. At first the company concentrated exclusively on astrology, in the form of both books and annuals. It was at that time the leading astrology publisher in the United States. They published the works of several prominent astrologers and published the Moon Sign Book, edited by George. The company moved to Los Angeles in 1920. Following George's death in 1954, the Moon Sign Book was edited by Sydney Omarr.

The company was bought out by a printing company and operated by Richard Juline starting in 1958, before being bought out by George's relative Carl L. Weschcke in 1960. Weschcke moved the headquarters to St. Paul, Minnesota, and renamed the company Llewellyn Publications. Under his ownership, they shifted away from astrology and began to publisher general books on the occult, including on topics related to witchcraft and Wicca. They operated several periodicals in this period, Aquarian Age Preview, Astrology Now, Llewellyn's New Times, and Gnostica. In 1970 they opened a retail bookstore in Minneapolis, Gnostica. It closed after only a few years. That decade they also sponsored an annual New Age festival, the Aquarian Age Festival. In 1988 they bought the paranormal-focused Fate magazine.

Declines in sales in 2001 spurred the company toward layoffs and a restructure of its sales and marketing departments in 2002. They also sold Fate to a company owned by its editor-in-chief, Galde Press. By the end of 2003 the company had rebounded with $16 million in gross sales. In 2001, they were described by scholar J. Gordon Melton as "one of the largest publishing and wholesaling organizations of occult, witchcraft, and magical literature in the United States". Its offices were later moved to the St. Paul suburb of Woodbury. They launched a mystery imprint in 2005, its first imprint, Midnight Ink. A year later, Llewellyn launched its second fiction imprint, Flux Books, which was focused on young adult fiction. Flux was sold to North Star Editions in 2016. In 2018, the Midnight Ink imprint was shuttered due to low sales. Sales for Llewellyn as a whole increased during the COVID-19 pandemic.
