= Peak oil =

Point in time when the maximum rate of petroleum extraction is reached

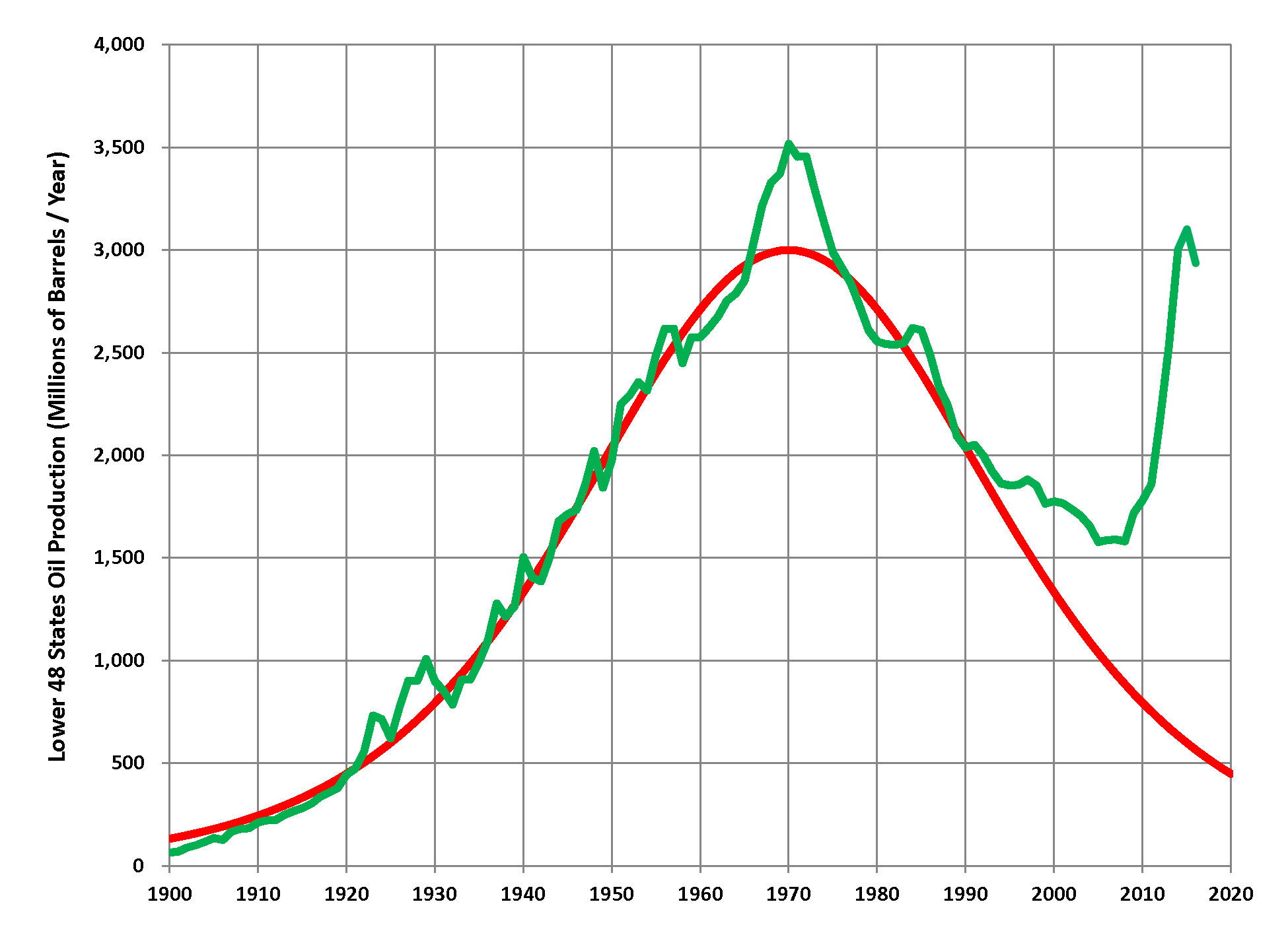
Hubbert's upper-bound U.S. peak oil prediction (1956) in red, and actual lower 48 U.S. states production through to 2016 in green

A 1956 world oil production model proposed by M. King Hubbert, showing historical data and future production – it had a peak of 12.5 billion barrels per year in about the year 2000. As of 2022, world oil production was about 29.5 billion barrels per year (80.8 Mbbl/day), with an oil glut between 2014 and 2018.

Peak oil, or peak extraction of oil, is the point when global petroleum production reaches its maximum rate, after which it will begin to decline irreversibly. Predictions range from 2025 to after 2050. The main concern is transportation, which relies heavily on gasoline, diesel and kerosene. Adoption of more efficient transport (like trains and waterways) would reduce oil demand, along with use of electric vehicles and biofuels.

Peak oil relates closely to oil depletion; while petroleum reserves are finite, the key issue is the economic viability of extraction at current prices. Initially, it was believed that oil production would decline due to reserve depletion, but a new theory suggests that reduced oil demand could lower prices, affecting extraction costs. Demand may also decline due to persistent high prices.

Over the last century, many predictions of peak oil timing have been made, often later proven incorrect due to increased extraction rates. M. King Hubbert's 1956 paper predicted U.S. production would peak between 1965 and 1971; his global peak oil predictions were predictive through the 1990s and 2000s but eventually were deemed premature due to improved drilling technology. From the 100 million barrels per day in 2024 current forecasts for peak oil range from 102 in 2030 to 113 in 2050. These estimates depend on future economic trends, technological advances, and efforts to mitigate climate change.

== Supply ==
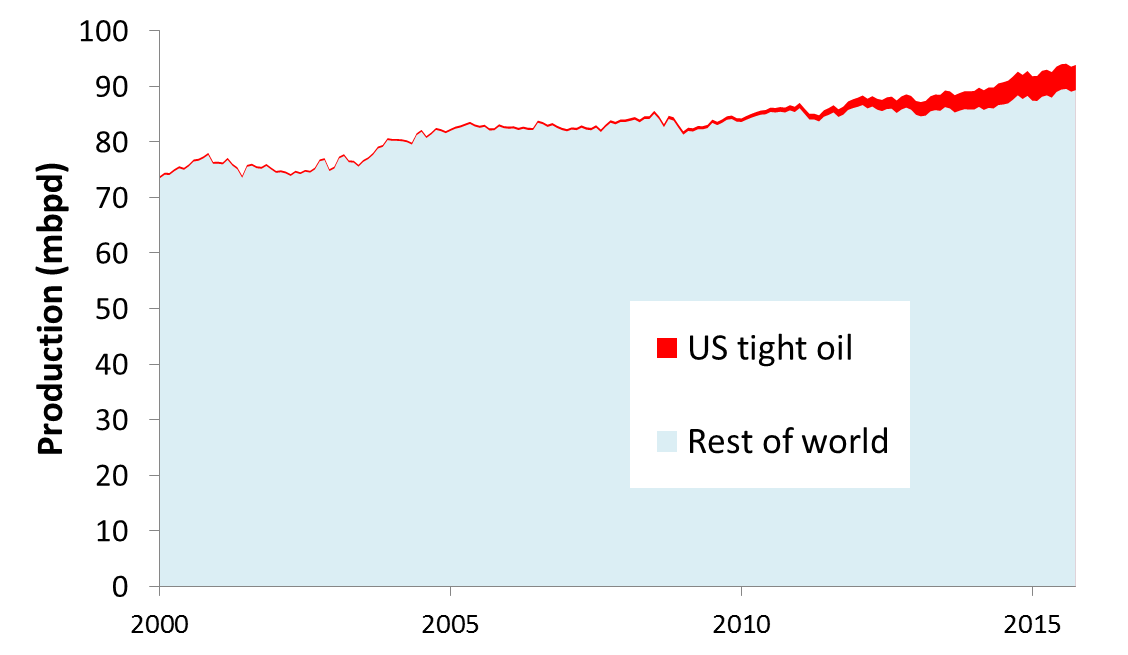
Global liquids production 2000–2015, indicating the component of US tight oil (Energy Information Administration)

=== Defining oil ===
Oil, or petroleum, is a mixture of hydrocarbon substances. By its very nature, what "oil" is may vary. The geology of a region affects the type of oil underground. The types of hydrocarbons produced from an oilfield may also vary depending on the geology.

Crude oil comes in various 'grades,' commonly classified as "light", "medium", "heavy", and "extra heavy". The exact definitions of these grades vary depending on the region from which the oil came. Grades of oil are also assessed by API gravity. Light oil flows naturally to the surface or can be extracted by simply pumping it from the ground. Heavy refers to oil that has higher density and lower API gravity. It does not flow as easily, and its consistency can be similar to that of molasses. While some of it can be produced using conventional techniques, recovery rates are better using unconventional methods.

Generally, especially with regard to peak oil, the primary concern regards what is called "crude oil" production (which may also be referred to as "crude and condensate" production in US EIA statistics), which is what is actually refined into the common fuels most people know such as gasoline and diesel fuel, in addition to other common fuels. Other oil production statistics may be named "total liquids production" or "petroleum and other liquids" in EIA statistics. This includes crude oil production in addition to other hydrocarbon liquids, such as natural-gas liquids (NGLs). These two production numbers are distinct and shouldn't be considered the same thing. Using "total liquids" production to refer to "crude oil" production is misleading. The extra liquids included in "total liquids" production do not refine into the same products. It can be misleading as it could be used to inflate the actual amount of crude oil being produced globally.

Where oil may come from is commonly divided into two categories, "conventional" oil sources and "unconventional" oil sources. The terms are not strictly defined and may vary within literature. As a result of the wide range of potential definitions, different oil production forecasts may vary based on which classes of liquids they choose to include or exclude. Some standard definitions for "conventional" and "unconventional" oil are detailed below.

Total and Non-Tight Oil US Production (up to December 2021). Data from the US Energy Information Administration website

=== Conventional sources ===
Conventional oil is oil that is extracted using "traditional" techniques (i.e., in common use before 2000). Conventional oil commonly refers to onshore oilfields and shallow offshore oilfields that are "easy" to extract.

It has been recognized that conventional oil production has peaked around 2005–2006. What has prevented peak oil from then on is US tight oil production, which rapidly increased since the 2008 financial crisis. Additionally, but to a lesser extent, Canadian oil-sands production has helped increase oil supply since 2008.

In the same way, sources of natural gas production are usually divided into "conventional" and "unconventional".

=== Unconventional sources ===
In 2014, United States crude oil production exceeded imports for the first time since the early 1990s.

Unlike conventional oil, unconventional oil refers to oil that is "difficult" to extract. The number of steps required translates into extremely high production costs. Common unconventional oil sources include:

- Oil sands are unconsolidated sandstone deposits containing large amounts of very viscous crude bitumen or extra-heavy crude oil. The bitumen or oil can be recovered by surface mining or by in-situ oil wells using steam injection or other techniques. It can be liquefied by upgrading, blending with diluent, or by heating; and then processed by a conventional oil refinery. The material found in oil sands is an extra-heavy and viscous form of oil known as bitumen.
- Tight oil refers to oil extracted from deposits of low-permeability rock using hydraulic fracturing techniques (commonly referred to as "fracking"). Hydraulic fracturing is a process where a well is first drilled and then fluid containing water, chemicals, and sand is injected at very high pressures to create fractures in the rock. This process has generated controversy as fluid injections may trigger seismic activity, in addition to concerns regarding the chemicals used.

Other less common unconventional oil sources include oil shale (see article for more information). Shale oil can be manufactured from the kerogen contained in an oil shale.

Tight oil is also commonly referred to as "shale oil" due to the oil often being in shale deposits. Due to this nickname, tight oil is often confused with oil shale.

Production of tight oil is mainly concentrated in the United States due to world-class geology and ease of borrowing (tight oil production is extremely expensive). Oil sands production is also concentrated in Canada for the same exact reasons (but different type of oil).

There are also economic tight oil deposits in Argentina known as the Vaca Muerta Formation, but are less developed than tight oil in the US due to a lack of infrastructure and less capacity to borrow money.

In recent history, production of tight oil led to a resurgence of US production in the 2010s. US tight oil production initially peaked in March 2015 and fell by 12 per cent over the next 18 months; but then production rose again, and by September 2017 production had exceeded the old peak. As of 2024, US oil production, especially tight oil production, is higher than ever thanks to the Permian Basin.

Venezuela has oil sands deposits similar in size to those of Canada, and approximately equal to the world's reserves of conventional oil. Venezuela's Orinoco Belt tar sands are less viscous than Canada's Athabasca oil sands – meaning they can be produced by more conventional means – but they are buried too deep to be extracted by surface mining. Estimates of the recoverable reserves of the Orinoco Belt range from 100 billion barrels (16×10^{9} m^{3}) to 270 billion barrels (43×10^{9} m^{3}). In 2009, USGS updated this value to 513 billion barrels (8.16×10^{10} m^{3}).

While not an actual source of unconventional oil, processes which convert other hydrocarbons are similar to unconventional oil in that they are 'unconventional' and very costly to produce. They include coal liquefaction or gas to liquids which produce synthetic fuels from coal or natural gas via the Fischer–Tropsch process, Bergius process, or Karrick process.

=== Discoveries ===
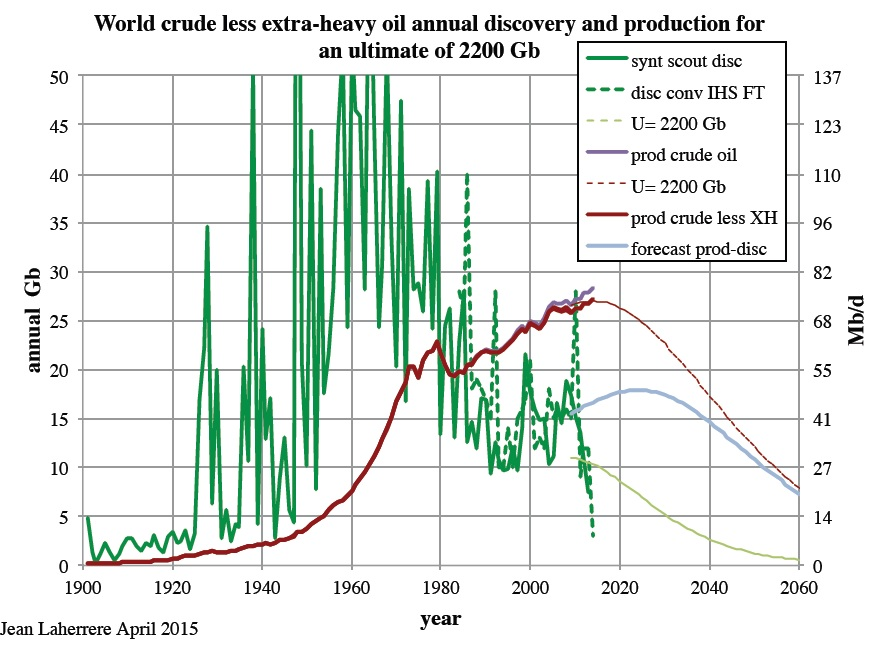
World oil discoveries peaked in the 1960s.

All the easy oil and gas in the world has pretty much been found. Now comes the harder work in finding and producing oil from more challenging environments and work areas.

— William J. Cummings, Exxon-Mobil company spokesman, December 2005

It is pretty clear that there is not much chance of finding any significant quantity of new cheap oil. Any new or unconventional oil is going to be expensive.

— Lord Ron Oxburgh, a former chairman of Shell, October 2008

Global discoveries of oilfields peaked in the 1960s at around 55 billion barrels (8.7×10^{9} m^{3}) per year. More recently, 2021 was the worst year for oil and gas discoveries dating back to 1946. This is to be expected of a finite resource. But despite the fall-off in new field discoveries, the reported proved reserves of crude oil remaining in the ground in 2014, which totaled 1,490 billion barrels, were more than quadruple the 1965 proved reserves of 354 billion barrels. A researcher for the U.S. Energy Information Administration has pointed out that after the first wave of discoveries in an area, most oil and natural gas reserve growth comes not from discoveries of new fields, but from extensions and additional gas found within existing fields.

A report by the UK Energy Research Centre noted that "discovery" is often used ambiguously, and explained the seeming contradiction between falling discovery rates since the 1960s and increasing reserves by the phenomenon of reserve growth. The report noted that increased reserves within a field may be discovered or developed by new technology years or decades after the original discovery. But because of the practice of "backdating", any new reserves within a field, even those to be discovered decades after the field discovery, are attributed to the year of initial field discovery, creating an illusion that discovery is not keeping pace with production.

As of 2010, finding new oil had reportedly become much more difficult and expensive, as oil producers had to search through more remote and inhospitable parts of the planet.

=== Oil reserves ===
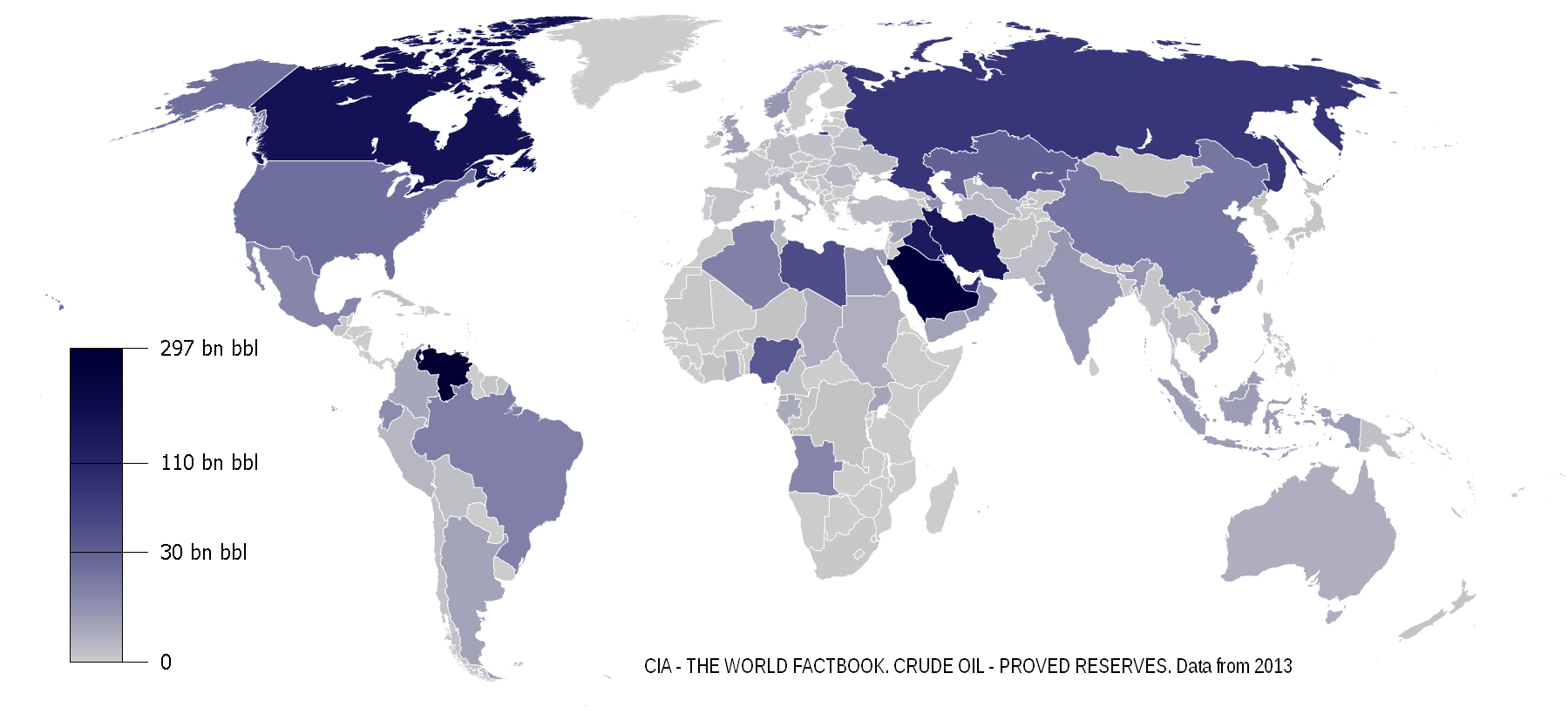
Proven oil reserves, 2013

Different classes of potential conventional crude oil reserves include crude oil with 90% certainty of being technically able to be produced from reservoirs (through a wellbore using primary, secondary, improved, enhanced, or tertiary methods); all crude with a 50% probability of being produced in the future (probable); and discovered reserves that have a 10% possibility of being produced in the future (possible). Reserve estimates based on these are referred to as 1P, proven (at least 90% probability); 2P, proven and probable (at least 50% probability); and 3P, proven, probable and possible (at least 10% probability), respectively.

As stated previously, oil is divided up into different types, therefore those counting up reserves should keep that in mind. Conventional oil reserves are different than unconventional reserves.

==== Concerns over stated oil reserves ====
[World] reserves are confused and in fact inflated. Many of the so-called reserves are in fact resources. They're not delineated, they're not accessible, they're not available for production.

— Sadad Al Husseini, former VP of Aramco, presentation to the Oil and Money conference, October 2007.

Sadad Al Husseini estimated that 300 billion barrels (48×10^{9} m^{3}) of the world's 1,200 billion barrels (190×10^{9} m^{3}) of proven reserves should be recategorized as speculative resources.

Graph of OPEC reported reserves showing jumps in stated reserves without associated discoveries, as well as the lack of depletion despite yearly production

One difficulty in forecasting the date of peak oil is the opacity surrounding the oil reserves classified as "proven". In many major producing countries, the majority of reserves claims have not been subject to outside audit or examination.

For the most part, proven reserves are stated by the oil companies, the producer states and the consumer states. All three have reasons to overstate their proven reserves: oil companies may look to increase their potential worth; producer countries gain a stronger international stature; and governments of consumer countries may seek a means to foster sentiments of security and stability within their economies and among consumers.

Major discrepancies arise from accuracy issues with the self-reported numbers from the Organization of the Petroleum Exporting Countries (OPEC). Besides the possibility that these nations have overstated their reserves for political reasons (during periods of no substantial discoveries), over 70 nations also follow a practice of not reducing their reserves to account for yearly production. Analysts have suggested that OPEC member nations have economic incentives to exaggerate their reserves, as the OPEC quota system allows greater output for countries with greater reserves.

==== Reserves of unconventional oil ====
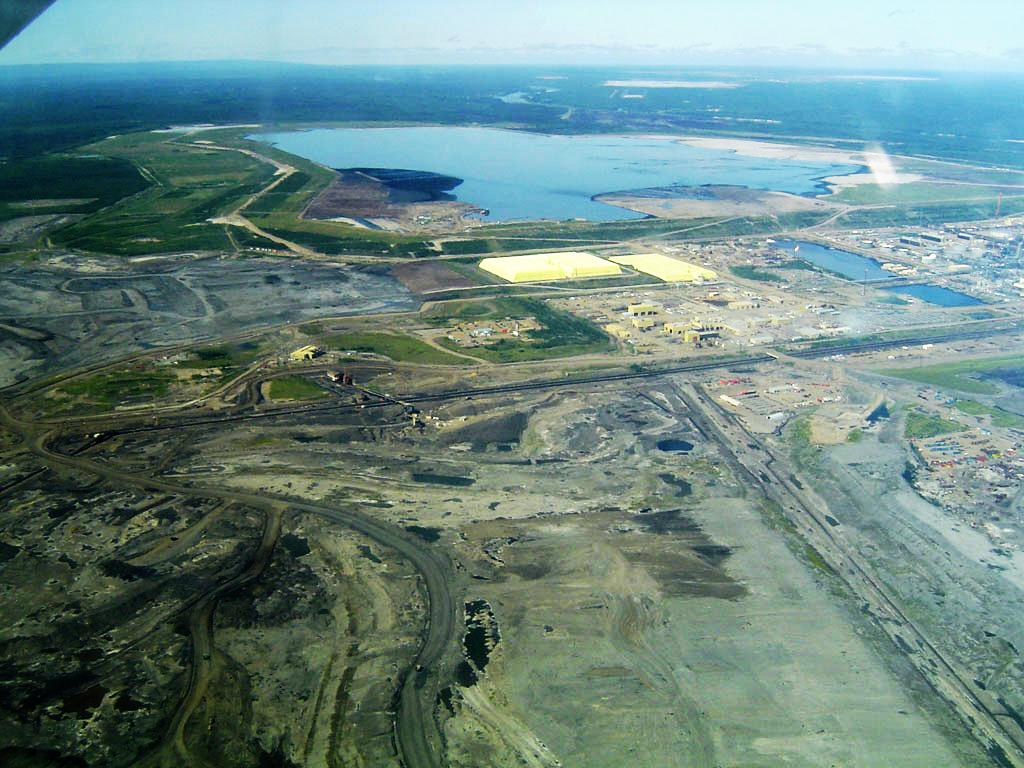
Syncrude's Mildred Lake mine site and plant near Fort McMurray, Alberta

As conventional oil becomes less available, it can be replaced with production of liquids from unconventional sources such as tight oil, oil sands, oil shale, ultra-heavy oils, gas-to-liquid technologies, coal-to-liquid technologies, and biofuel technologies. In the 2007 and subsequent International Energy Outlook editions, the word "Oil" was replaced with "Liquids" in the chart of world energy consumption. In 2009 biofuels was included in "Liquids" instead of in "Renewables". The inclusion of natural gas liquids, a bi-product of natural gas extraction, in "Liquids" has been criticized as it is mostly a chemical feedstock which is generally not used as transport fuel.

Reserve estimates are based on profitability, which depends on both oil price and cost of production. Hence, unconventional sources such as heavy crude oil, oil sands, and oil shale may be included as new techniques reduce the cost of extraction. With rule changes by the SEC, oil companies can now book them as proven reserves after opening a strip mine or thermal facility for extraction. These unconventional sources are more labor and resource intensive to produce, however, requiring extra energy to refine, resulting in higher production costs and more greenhouse gas emissions per barrel (or barrel equivalent).

Texas oil production declined after peaking in 1972 but had a resurgence in the 2010s due to tight oil production. View chart definition.

Greenhouse gas emissions are up to three times higher than conventional oil on a "well to tank" basis. This includes the emissions from finding, extracting, refining, and distributing it. Industry prefers a “well to wheels” basis which also includes the emissions from burning the final product in a vehicle (which is when 80% of the carbon is released from a barrel of crude). By including the combustion of the final product, the greenhouse gases come out to being 10 to 45% more. Environmentalists say including the emissions from burning the fuel, which are the same regardless of how it is produced, obscures how much more carbon-intensive unconventional oil production is.

While the energy used, resources needed, and environmental effects of extracting unconventional sources have traditionally been prohibitively high, major unconventional oil sources being considered for large-scale production are the extra heavy oil in the Orinoco Belt of Venezuela, the Athabasca Oil Sands in the Western Canadian Sedimentary Basin, and the oil shale of the Green River Formation in Colorado, Utah, and Wyoming in the United States. Energy companies such as Syncrude and Suncor have been extracting bitumen for decades but production has increased greatly in recent years with the development of steam-assisted gravity drainage and other extraction technologies.

Chuck Masters of the USGS estimates that, "Taken together, these resource occurrences, in the Western Hemisphere, are approximately equal to the Identified Reserves of conventional crude oil accredited to the Middle East." Authorities familiar with the resources believe that the world's ultimate reserves of unconventional oil are several times as large as those of conventional oil and will be highly profitable for companies as a result of higher prices in the 21st century. In October 2009, the USGS updated the Orinoco tar sands (Venezuela) recoverable "mean value" to 513 billion barrels (8.16×10^{10} m^{3}), with a 90% chance of being within the range of 380-652 billion barrels (103.7×10^{9} m^{3}), making this area "one of the world's largest recoverable oil accumulations".

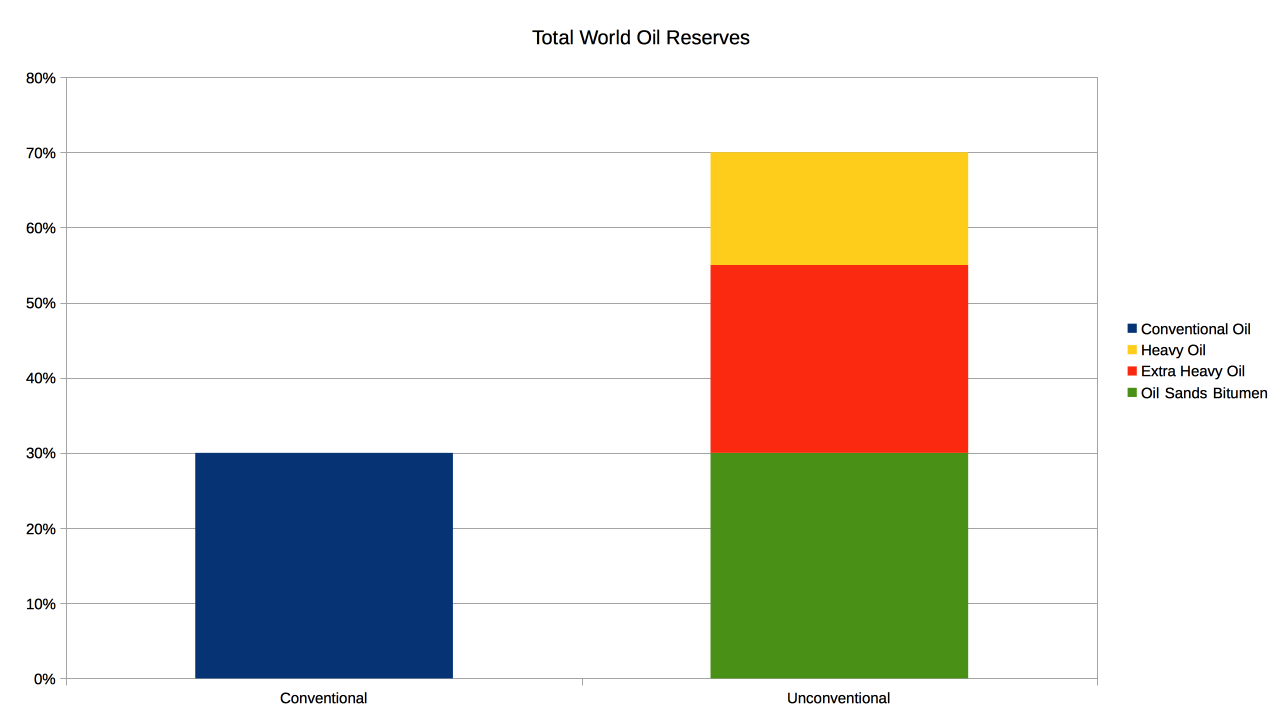
Unconventional resources are much larger than conventional ones.

Moreover, oil extracted from these sources typically contains contaminants such as sulfur and heavy metals that are energy-intensive to extract and can leave tailings, ponds containing hydrocarbon sludge, in some cases. The same applies to much of the Middle East's undeveloped conventional oil reserves, much of which is heavy, viscous, and contaminated with sulfur and metals to the point of being unusable. However, high oil prices make these sources more financially appealing. A study by Wood Mackenzie suggests that by the early 2020s all the world's extra oil supply is likely to come from unconventional sources.

=== Production ===
Globally, oil production is very concentrated. Not just geographically depending on the country, but depending on the oilfields themselves. As of 2014, it was recognized that 25 oilfields account for 25% of global oil production, and a few hundred 'giant' oilfields (reserves greater than 500 million barrels) account for 50% of global oil production. Globally, the amount of oilfields is estimated to be between 50,000-70,000. Additionally, it has now been recognized that worldwide oil discoveries have been less than worldwide annual oil production since about 1980.

More recently, there has been some research about the net energy of oil production. Regarding energy production, what also matters is the "Energy Return on Investment" (EROI). To put it simply, in order to produce energy one must also invest some energy, and the EROI is the return on investment in energy terms. With regards to conventional and unconventional oil, it is recognized that conventional oil offers a much higher EROI than unconventional sources of oil. In reality, the EROI is felt through the cost of production. A higher EROI generally translates to a lower cost of production and higher (monetary) profits for the oil company, and a lower EROI generally translates to a higher cost of production and lower (monetary) profits for the oil company. A higher energy investment means physically using more materials (which require energy to produce) in order to produce energy. Oil sources with a lower EROI are theoretically more environmentally damaging than those with higher EROIs, due to the larger amount of resources required to extract the oil. For instance, building a gigantic oil rig produces a lot of greenhouse gas emissions, but is a requirement to access "difficult" deep water offshore oil reserves.

==== Oil field decline ====
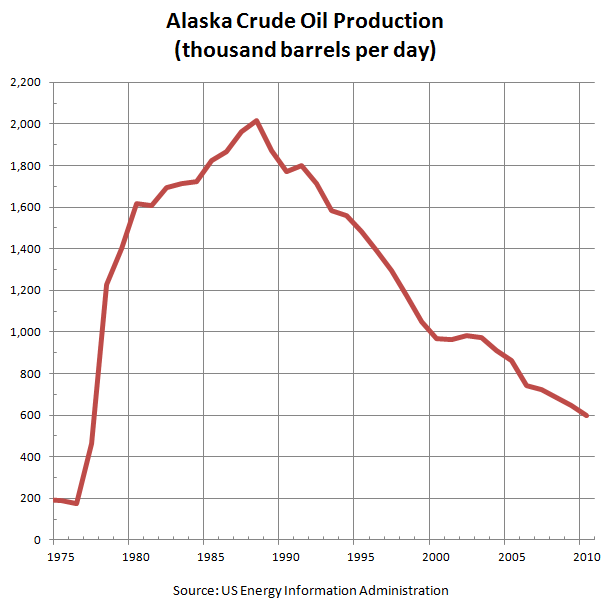
By 2007, Alaska's oil production had declined 70% since peaking in 1988.

As a finite resource, naturally every oilfield eventually declines. Generally, the production profile of a typical oil well is that first production increases, then it plateaus, and then it declines. This is the underlying assumption of the Hubbert peak theory. The chart to the right shows the decline of Alaskan oil production since after the 1980s, which is reflective of a typical pattern of decline among most oilfields.

Meanwhile, unconventional oil production follows a different production profile depending on the type. For tight oil, production begins at its maximum, or near its maximum, and then quickly declines.

As mentioned previously in the production section, oil production is very concentrated in a few fields, therefore these few fields (out of every field) can dictate where oil production would be headed. If these few fields were to decline, then all oil production would decline. In 2019 when Saudi Aramco went public, the Ghawar oilfield, which is the largest oil field in the world, was revealed to be producing much lower than what conventional wisdom at the time had assumed its production was. Although while no official data exists, certain analysts believe that the Ghawar field has entered into decline, corroborated by the aforementioned news from 2019.

According to the US EIA in 2006, Saudi Aramco Senior Vice President Abdullah Saif estimated that its existing fields were declining at a rate of 5% to 12% per year. According to a study of large oilfields (reserves greater than 500 million barrels) published in 2009, the average decline rate of onshore fields was about 5%, and offshore fields were about 9.5%. An annual rate of decline of 5.1% in 800 of the world's largest oil fields was reported by the International Energy Agency in their World Energy Outlook 2008. In 2013 an informal study of 733 giant oil fields concluded that only 32% of the ultimately recoverable oil remained.

== Demand ==
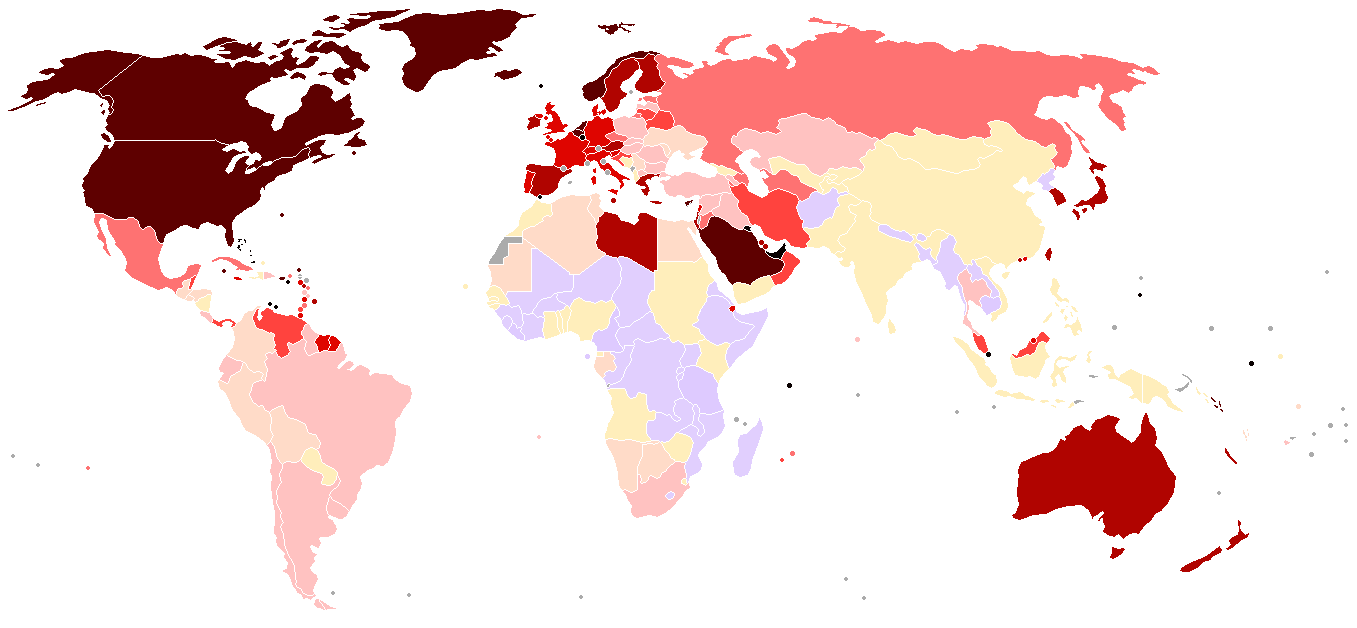
Oil consumption in barrels per day per capita in 2007. Darker colors represent more consumption, gray represents no data. (source: NationMaster statistics, 2007-01-13): > 0.07; 0.07–0.05; 0.05–0.035; 0.035–0.025; 0.025–0.02 / 0.02–0.015; 0.015–0.01; 0.01–0.005; 0.005–0.0015 < 0.0015

=== Peak oil demand ===
More recently, "peak oil demand" has become a more popular interpretation of peak oil. The International Energy Agency (IEA) argues that the world will first intentionally reduce oil demand before supply issues actually become a problem, as to address climate change and greenhouse gas emissions.

Unlike peak oil demand, peak oil is generally concerned with the global supply of oil, due to the importance of oil to the global economy.

The central idea revolves around technological advancements such as the development of electric vehicles and potentially biofuels in order to phase out gasoline or diesel powered vehicles. Then, in theory, oil demand would fall over time.

In the past 4 decades, oil demand has secularly increased. Generally, oil demand increases unless there is a recession. Recently, in 2020 oil demand sharply fell from 2019 levels due to the COVID-19 pandemic, but recovered swiftly by 2022.

In 2020, British Petroleum (BP) claimed that the world had hit peak oil demand, predicting that oil demand would never recover to pre-pandemic levels due to increased proliferation of electric vehicles and stronger action on climate change.

As of 2023, new projections from Enverus Intelligence Research and the U.S. Energy Information Administration suggest that peak oil demand will not occur before 2030. Enverus forecasts global oil demand to reach 108 million barrels per day by 2030, driven by slower improvements in fuel economy and electric vehicle adoption in the U.S. Similarly, the EIA has updated its estimates, predicting global liquid fuels consumption will be 102.91 million barrels per day in 2024 and 104.26 million barrels per day in 2025, due to higher-than-expected non-OECD consumption. These updates indicate a continued increase in oil demand, potentially exceeding pre-pandemic levels.

In 2024 OPEC suggested that global demand for oil will not decline.

=== Oil as a component of energy demand ===
Energy demand is distributed amongst four broad sectors: transportation, residential, commercial, and industrial. Oil demand primarily concerns the transportation sector, as 50% of oil use in OECD countries are for road transportation. This is a result of the proliferation of vehicles powered by internal combustion engines. Transportation is therefore of particular interest to those seeking to mitigate the effects of peak oil.

As of 2023, it is forecasted by the IEA that 90% of global oil demand growth will come from the Asia-Pacific region. As of 2022, China and India are the second and third largest oil consumers globally. The United States is still the largest consumer of oil globally (as of 2022).

Generally, when countries economically develop, they use more energy, which includes using more oil. In recent years, China surpassed the United States as the world's largest crude oil importer in 2015. This was a result of China developing in addition to US oil imports decreasing due to increased US tight oil production.

=== Economic growth ===
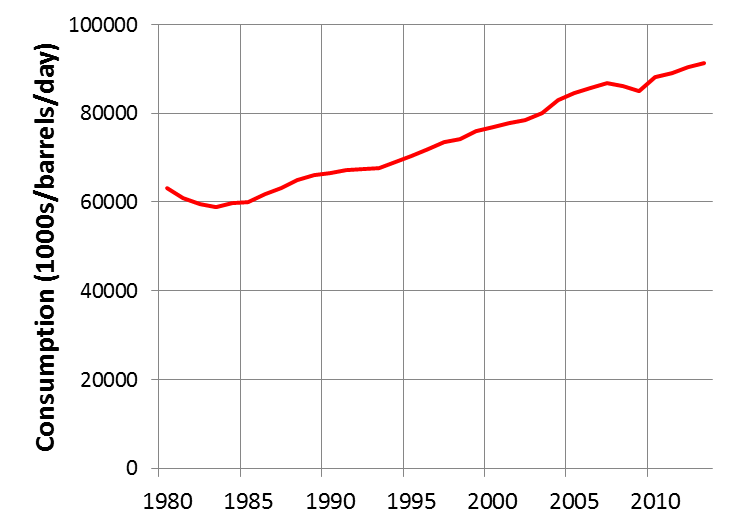
Global consumption of oil 1980–2013 (Energy Information Administration)

Some analysts argue that the cost of oil has a profound effect on economic growth due to its pivotal role in the extraction of resources and the processing, manufacturing, and transportation of goods. Comparing GDP and energy consumption, there is a clearly defined correlation between having a higher GDP, and having a higher energy consumption. To some degree, this is an intuitive observation as those in very undeveloped countries use a small amount of energy (no electricity), meanwhile those in developed countries use a high amount of energy (electricity consumption, gasoline consumption), and this use of energy translates into economic activity.

There is a concern by more pessimistic analysts that assuming there was a dramatic spike in the price of oil, the world economy may be unable to pay for it, leading to a disconnect between the price of oil that oil producers need to maintain supply, and the price of oil consumers need to be able to afford things. This has partially occurred in recent years with the dramatic run-up in oil prices during 2022 and then the release of the US Strategic Petroleum Reserve in 2022 in order to cool down oil prices.

== Possible consequences ==
The wide use of fossil fuels has been one of the most important stimuli of economic growth and prosperity since the Industrial Revolution, allowing humans to participate in takedown, or the consumption of energy at a greater rate than it is being replaced. Some theorize that when oil production significantly decreases, human culture and modern technological society will be forced to change drastically.

A rise in oil prices as a result of peak oil could severely impact the cost of transport, food, heating, and electricity globally. A recent example of this has been seen since Russia's invasion of Ukraine in 2022; a global spike in oil and energy prices exacerbated the global energy crisis (2021–present).

The impact of oil supply limitations, assuming they occur, will depend heavily on how severe the limitations are and the development and adoption of effective alternatives.

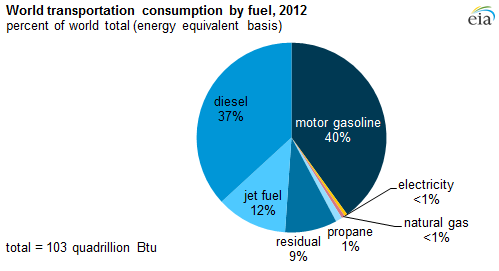
World transport energy use by fuel type, 2012. Notice: While outdated, the general idea of the statistics hasn't changed much as of 2021.

=== Possible long-term effects on human lifestyle ===
Commodity production is heavily globalized in 2024, with almost all major supply chains relying upon diesel fuel or heavy fuel oil to power almost all global shipping and aviation fuel to power all aircraft. A study from the Geologic Survey of Finland found that 90% of the supply chain of all industrially manufactured products depend on oil derived services or oil derived products, and World Bank data shows over 30% of global GDP accounted for by exports of goods and services. Many countries with highly developed economies are dependent on food imports (for example, the United Kingdom produced just under half of domestic food consumption as of 2021), meaning a disruption in trade due to peak oil would exacerbate food insecurity.

Since aviation relies mainly on jet fuels derived from crude oil, commercial aviation has been predicted to go into decline alongside global oil production as it would then become unaffordable for most people. Alternatives such as electric aircraft show promise, but are yet to prove commercially viable as of 2024, while hybrids approaches such as a 50% blend of aviation biofuel or utilising metal sails on cargo ships still rely on oil.

=== Possible effects on agriculture ===
Supplies of oil are absolutely critical to modern agriculture. Diesel fuel and agrichemicals such as pesticides and fertilizers are directly derived from hydrocarbons. According to Our World in Data, artificial fertilizers feed over 3.5 billion people as of 2015.

The largest consumer of fossil fuels in modern agriculture is ammonia production for fertilizer via the Haber process, which is essential to high-yielding intensive agriculture. The specific fossil fuel input to fertilizer production is primarily natural gas, to provide hydrogen via steam reforming.

More recently, some theorize that hydrogen could be generated without the use of fossil fuels by using renewable electricity for electrolysis. But as of 2024, this remains commercially unviable.

=== Possible mitigation ===
In 2005, the United States Department of Energy published a report titled Peaking of World Oil Production: Impacts, Mitigation, & Risk Management. Known as the Hirsch report, it stated, "The peaking of world oil production presents the U.S. and the world with an unprecedented risk management problem." To avoid the serious social and economic implications a global decline in oil production could entail, the Hirsch report emphasized the need to find alternatives, at least ten to twenty years before the peak, and to phase out the use of oil over that time. This was similar to a plan proposed for Sweden that same year. Such mitigation could include energy conservation and fuel substitution. The timing of mitigation responses is critical. Premature initiation would be undesirable, but if initiated too late could be more costly and have more negative economic consequences.

The two major oil consumers, China (second globally) and India (third globally), are taking many steps not to increase their crude oil consumption by encouraging the renewable energy options.

Methods that have been suggested for mitigating these urban and suburban issues include the use of non-petroleum vehicles such as electric vehicles, transit-oriented development, carfree cities, bicycles, light trains, smart growth, shared space, urban consolidation, urban villages, and New Urbanism.

An economic theory that has been proposed as a remedy is the introduction of a steady state economy. Such a system could include a tax shifting from income to depleting natural resources (and pollution), as well as the limitation of advertising that stimulates demand and population growth. It could also include the institution of policies that move away from globalization and toward localization to conserve energy resources, provide local jobs, and maintain local decision-making authority. Zoning policies could be adjusted to promote resource conservation and eliminate sprawl.

=== Potential positive aspects ===
It is known that the combustion of fossil fuels emits greenhouse gases which cause climate change. Therefore, a reduction in oil use would be a net positive for the environment.

Permaculture sees peak oil as holding tremendous potential for positive change, assuming countries act with foresight. The rebuilding of local food networks, green energy production, and the general implementation of "energy descent culture" are argued to be ethical responses to the acknowledgment of finite fossil resources.

The Transition Towns movement, started in Totnes, Devon and spread internationally by "The Transition Handbook" (Rob Hopkins) and Transition Network, sees the restructuring of society for more local resilience and ecological stewardship as a natural response to the combination of peak oil and climate change.

== Predictions ==
The idea that the rate of oil production would peak and irreversibly decline is an old one. In 1919, David White, chief geologist of the United States Geological Survey, wrote of US petroleum: "... the peak of production will soon be passed, possibly within 3 years." In 1953, Eugene Ayers, a researcher for Gulf Oil, projected that if US ultimate recoverable oil reserves were 100 billion barrels, then production in the US would peak no later than 1960. If ultimate recoverable were to be as high as 200 billion barrels, which he warned was wishful thinking, US peak production would come no later than 1970. Likewise for the world, he projected a peak somewhere between 1985 (one trillion barrels ultimate recoverable) and 2000 (two trillion barrels recoverable). Ayers made his projections without a mathematical model. He wrote: "But if the curve is made to look reasonable, it is quite possible to adapt mathematical expressions to it and to determine, in this way, the peak dates corresponding to various ultimate recoverable reserve numbers"

By observing past discoveries and production levels, and predicting future discovery trends, the geoscientist M. King Hubbert used statistical modelling in 1956 to predict that United States oil production would peak between 1965 and 1971. While this prediction held for many decades, more recently as of 2018 daily oil production in the United States had finally exceeded its previous peak in 1970. Hubbert used a semi-logistical curved model (sometimes incorrectly compared to a normal distribution). He assumed the production rate of a limited resource would follow a roughly symmetrical distribution. Depending on the limits of exploitability and market pressures, the rise or decline of resource production over time might be sharper or more stable, appear more linear or curved. That model and its variants are now called Hubbert peak theory; they have been used to describe and predict the peak and decline of production from regions, countries, and multinational areas. The same theory has also been applied to other limited-resource production.

The UK Energy Research Centre noted in 2009:

Few analysts now adhere to a symmetrical bell-shaped production curve. This is correct, as there is no natural physical reason why the production of a resource should follow such a curve and little empirical evidence that it does.

— Bentley et al., Comparison of global oil supply forecasts

The report noted that Hubbert had used the logistic curve because it was mathematically convenient, not because he believed it to be literally correct. The study observed that in most cases the asymmetric exponential model provided a better fit (as in the case of Seneca cliff model), and that peaks tended to occur well before half the oil had been produced, with the result that in nearly all cases, the post-peak decline was more gradual than the increase leading up to the peak.

=== List of past predictions of peak oil ===
In the 21st century, predictions of future oil production made in 2007 and 2009 stated either that the peak had already occurred, that oil production was on the cusp of the peak, or that it would occur soon. A decade later, world oil production would rise to a new all time high in 2018, as developments in extraction technology enabled a massive expansion of U.S. tight oil production. Though world oil production faltered in 2020 due to the coronavirus pandemic causing significant disruptions in the oil markets, production in 2023 reached a new high of 101.73 million barrels per day in 2023.

A selection of estimates of the year of peak world oil production, compiled by the United States Energy Information Administration. Some forecasts relate to conventional oil.
| Pub. | Made by | Peak year/range | Pub. | Made by | Peak year/range |
|---|---|---|---|---|---|
| 1972 | Esso | About 2000 | 1999 | Parker | 2040 |
| 1972 | United Nations | By 2000 | 2000 | A. A. Bartlett | 2004 or 2019 |
| 1974 | Hubbert | 1991–2000 | 2000 | Duncan | 2006 |
| 1976 | UK Dep. of Energy | About 2000 | 2000 | EIA | 2021–2067; 2037 most likely |
| 1977 | Hubbert | 1996 | 2000 | EIA (WEO) | Beyond 2020 |
| 1977 | Ehrlich, et al. | 2000 | 2001 | Deffeyes | 2003–2008 |
| 1979 | Shell | Plateau by 2004 | 2001 | Goodstein | 2007 |
| 1981 | World Bank | Plateau around 2000 | 2002 | Smith | 2010–2016 |
| 1985 | J. Bookout | 2020 | 2002 | Campbell | 2010 |
| 1989 | Campbell | 1989 | 2002 | Cavallo | 2025–2028 |
| 1994 | L. F. Ivanhoe | OPEC plateau 2000–2050 | 2003 | Greene, et al. | 2020–2050 |
| 1995 | Petroconsultants | 2005 | 2003 | Laherrère | 2010–2020 |
| 1997 | Ivanhoe | 2010 | 2003 | Lynch | No visible peak |
| 1997 | J. D. Edwards | 2020 | 2003 | Shell | After 2025 |
| 1998 | IEA | 2014 | 2003 | Simmons | 2007–2009 |
| 1998 | Campbell & Laherrère | 2004 | 2004 | Bakhitari | 2006–2007 |
| 1999 | Campbell | 2010 | 2004 | CERA | After 2020 |
| 1999 | Peter Odell | 2060 | 2004 | PFC Energy | 2015–2020 |

== Criticisms ==
=== General arguments ===
The theory of peak oil is controversial and became an issue of political debate in the US and Europe in the mid-2000s. Critics argued that newly found oil reserves forestalled a peak oil event. Some argued that oil production from new oil reserves and existing fields will continue to increase at a rate that outpaces demand, until alternative energy sources for current fossil fuel dependence are found. In 2015, analysts in the petroleum and financial industries claimed that the "age of oil" had already reached a new stage where the excess supply that appeared in late 2014 may continue. A consensus was emerging that parties to an international agreement would introduce measures to constrain the combustion of hydrocarbons in an effort to limit global temperature rise to the nominal 2 °C that scientists predicted would limit environmental harm to tolerable levels.

Another argument against the peak oil theory is reduced demand from various options and technologies substituting oil. US federal funding to develop algae fuels increased since 2000 due to rising fuel prices. Many other projects are being funded in Australia, New Zealand, Europe, the Middle East, and elsewhere and private companies are entering the field.

=== Oil industry representatives ===
John Hofmeister, president of Royal Dutch Shell's US operations, while agreeing that conventional oil production would soon start to decline, criticized the analysis of peak oil theory by Matthew Simmons for being "overly focused on a single country: Saudi Arabia, the world's largest exporter and OPEC swing producer." Hofmeister pointed to the large reserves at the US outer continental shelf, which held an estimated 100 billion barrels (16×10^{9} m^{3}) of oil and natural gas. However, only 15% of those reserves were currently exploitable, a good part of that off the coasts of Texas, Louisiana, Mississippi, and Alabama.

Hofmeister also pointed to unconventional sources of oil such as the oil sands of Canada, where Shell was active. The Canadian oil sands—a natural combination of sand, water, and oil found largely in Alberta and Saskatchewan—are believed to contain one trillion barrels of oil. Another trillion barrels are also said to be trapped in rocks in Colorado, Utah, and Wyoming, in the form of oil shale. Environmentalists argue that major environmental, social, and economic obstacles would make extracting oil from these areas excessively difficult. Hofmeister argued that if oil companies were allowed to drill more in the United States enough to produce another 2 million barrels per day (320×10^{3} m^{3}/d), oil and gas prices would not be as high as they were in the late 2000s. He thought in 2008 that high energy prices would cause social unrest similar to the 1992 Rodney King riots.

In 2009, Dr. Christof Rühl, chief economist of BP, argued against the peak oil hypothesis:

Physical peak oil, which I have no reason to accept as a valid statement either on theoretical, scientific or ideological grounds, would be insensitive to prices. ... In fact the whole hypothesis of peak oil – which is that there is a certain amount of oil in the ground, consumed at a certain rate, and then it's finished – does not react to anything ... Therefore there will never be a moment when the world runs out of oil because there will always be a price at which the last drop of oil can clear the market. And you can turn anything into oil if you are willing to pay the financial and environmental price ... (Global Warming) is likely to be more of a natural limit than all these peak oil theories combined. ... Peak oil has been predicted for 150 years. It has never happened, and it will stay this way.

— Dr. Christof Rühl, BP

Rühl argued that the main limitations for oil availability are "above ground" factors such as the availability of staff, expertise, technology, investment security, funds, and global warming, and that the oil question was about price and not the physical availability.

In 2008, Daniel Yergin of CERA suggest that a recent high price phase might add to a future demise of the oil industry, not of complete exhaustion of resources or an apocalyptic shock but the timely and smooth setup of alternatives. Yergin went on to say, "This is the fifth time that the world is said to be running out of oil. Each time-whether it was the 'gasoline famine' at the end of WWI or the 'permanent shortage' of the 1970s-technology and the opening of new frontier areas have banished the spectre of decline. There's no reason to think that technology is finished this time."

In 2006, Clive Mather, CEO of Shell Canada, said the Earth's supply of bitumen hydrocarbons was "almost infinite", referring to hydrocarbons in oil sands.

=== Others ===
In 2006 attorney and mechanical engineer Peter W. Huber asserted that the world was just running out of "cheap oil", explaining that as oil prices rise, unconventional sources become economically viable. He predicted that, "[t]he tar sands of Alberta alone contain enough hydrocarbon to fuel the entire planet for over 100 years."

Environmental journalist George Monbiot responded to a 2012 report by Leonardo Maugeri by suggesting that there is more than enough oil (from unconventional sources) to "deep-fry" the world with climate change. Stephen Sorrell, senior lecturer Science and Technology Policy Research, Sussex Energy Group, and lead author of the UKERC Global Oil Depletion report, and Christophe McGlade, doctoral researcher at the UCL Energy Institute have criticized Maugeri's assumptions about decline rates.

== See also ==
Prediction

- BP Energy Outlook 2020
- Doomer
- Ecoflation
- Hubbert linearization
- Oil Storm
- The Limits to Growth
- Societal collapse

Energy policy

- Energy development
- Energy law
- Energy security
- Global strategic petroleum reserves
- Pro-nuclear energy movement
- Shale gas
- Soft energy path
- United States energy independence
- United States energy law

Economics

- 2000s commodities boom
- 2010s oil glut
- 2020 stock market crash
- 2020 Russia–Saudi Arabia oil price war
- 2020s energy crisis
- Carbon bubble
- Degrowth
- Diminishing returns
- Ecological economics
- Efficient energy use
- Financial impact of the 2019–20 coronavirus pandemic
- Kuznets curve
- Gasoline and diesel usage and pricing
- List of countries by oil consumption
- List of countries by proven oil reserves
- Low-carbon economy
- Oil burden
- Renewable energy commercialization
- Stranded assets
- World oil market chronology from 2003
- Jevons paradox

Other peaks

- Peak car
- Peak coal
- Peak gas
- Peak gold
- Peak minerals
- Peak phosphorus
- Peak uranium
- Peak water
- Peak wheat

Others

- Unconventional (oil and gas) reservoir
- Age of Oil
- Magic number (oil)
- Oil Shockwave
- Overconsumption
- Overpopulation
- Overshoot
- Resource depletion
- The Coal Question

== Further information ==
=== Books ===
- Aleklett, Kjel (2012). Peeking at Peak Oil. Springer Science. ISBN 978-1-4614-3423-8.
- Campbell, Colin J. (2004). The Essence of Oil & Gas Depletion. Multi-Science Publishing. ISBN 978-0-906522-19-6.
- Campbell, Colin J. (2005). Oil Crisis Multi-Science Publishing.
- Campbell, Colin J. (2013). Campbell's Atlas of Oil and Gas Depletion ISBN 978-1-4614-3576-1
- Deffeyes, Kenneth S. (2002). Hubbert's Peak: The Impending World Oil Shortage. Princeton University Press. ISBN 978-0-691-09086-3.
- Deffeyes, Kenneth S. (2005). Beyond Oil: The View from Hubbert's Peak. Hill and Wang. ISBN 978-0-8090-2956-3.
- Goodstein David (2005). Out of Gas: The End of the Age of Oil. AGU Fall Meeting Abstracts. Vol. 2004. WW Norton. pp. U21B–03. Bibcode:2004AGUFM.U21B..03G. ISBN 978-0-393-05857-4.
- Greer, John M. (2008). The Long Descent: A User's Guide to the End of the Industrial Age. New Society Publishers. ISBN 978-0-865-71609-4.
- Greer, John M. (2013). Not the Future We Ordered: The Psychology of Peak Oil and the Myth of Eternal Progress. Karnac Books. ISBN 978-1-78049-088-5.
- Herold, D. M. (2012). Peak Oil. Hurstelung und Verlag. ISBN 978-3-8448-0097-5.
- Heinberg, Richard (2003). The Party's Over: Oil, War, and the Fate of Industrial Societies. New Society Publishers. ISBN 978-0-86571-482-3.
- Heinberg, Richard (2004). Power Down: Options and Actions for a Post-Carbon World. New Society Publishers. ISBN 978-0-86571-510-3.
- Heinberg, Richard (2006). The Oil Depletion Protocol: A Plan to Avert Oil Wars, Terrorism and Economic Collapse. New Society Publishers. ISBN 978-0-86571-563-9.
- Heinberg, Richard & Lerch, Daniel (2010). The Post Carbon Reader: Managing the 21st Century's Sustainability Crises. Watershed Media. ISBN 978-0-9709500-6-2.
- Herberg, Mikkal (2014). Energy Security and the Asia-Pacific: Course Reader. United States: The National Bureau of Asian Research.
- Huber, Peter (2005). The Bottomless Well. Basic Books. ISBN 978-0-465-03116-0.
- Kunstler James H. (2005). The Long Emergency: Surviving the End of the Oil Age, Climate Change, and Other Converging Catastrophes. Atlantic Monthly Press. ISBN 978-0-87113-888-0.
- Leggett Jeremy K. (2005). The Empty Tank: Oil, Gas, Hot Air, and the Coming Financial Catastrophe. Random House. ISBN 978-1-4000-6527-1.
- Leggett, Jeremy K. (2005). Half Gone: Oil, Gas, Hot Air and the Global Energy Crisis. Portobello Books. ISBN 978-1-84627-004-8.
- Lovins Amory; et al. (2005). Winning the Oil Endgame: Innovation for Profit, Jobs and Security. Rocky Mountain Institute. ISBN 978-1-881071-10-5.
- Pfeiffer Dale Allen (2004). The End of the Oil Age. Lulu Press. ISBN 978-1-4116-0629-6.
- Newman Sheila (2008). The Final Energy Crisis (2nd ed.). Pluto Press. ISBN 978-0-7453-2717-4. OCLC 228370383.
- Roberts Paul (2004). The End of Oil. On the Edge of a Perilous New World. Boston: Houghton Mifflin. ISBN 978-0-618-23977-1.
- Ruppert Michael C (2005). Crossing the Rubicon: The Decline of the American Empire at the End of the Age of Oil. New Society. ISBN 978-0-86571-540-0.
- Simmons Matthew R (2005). Twilight in the Desert: The Coming Saudi Oil Shock and the World Economy. Hoboken, N.J.: Wiley & Sons. ISBN 978-0-471-73876-3.
- Simon Julian L (1998). The Ultimate Resource. Princeton University Press. ISBN 978-0-691-00381-8.
- Schneider-Mayerson Matthew (2015). Peak Oil: Apocalyptic Environmentalism and Libertarian Political Culture. University of Chicago Press. ISBN 978-0-226-28543-6.
- Stansberry Mark A; Reimbold Jason (2008). The Braking Point. Hawk Publishing. ISBN 978-1-930709-67-6.
- Tertzakian Peter (2006). A Thousand Barrels a Second. McGraw-Hill. ISBN 978-0-07-146874-9.
- Vassiliou, Marius (2009). Historical Dictionary of the Petroleum Industry. Scarecrow Press (Rowman & Littlefield). ISBN 978-0-8108-5993-7.

=== Articles ===
- Bardi, Ugo (2019). "Peak oil, 20 years later: Failed prediction or useful insight?". Energy Research & Social Science. 48: 257–261. Bibcode:2019ERSS...48..257B. doi:10.1016/j.erss.2018.09.022.
- Benner, Katie (7 December 2005). "Lawmakers: Will we run out of oil?". CNN. Archived from the original on 14 December 2005.
- Benner, Katie (3 November 2004). "Oil: Is the end at hand?". CNN. Archived from the original on 3 November 2004.
- Colin, Campbell, Laherrère Jean (1998). "The end of cheap oil". Scientific American. 278 (3): 78–83. Bibcode:1998SciAm.278c..78C. doi:10.1038/scientificamerican0398-78. Archived from the original on 27 September 2007.
- De Young, R. (2014). "Some behavioral aspects of energy descent." Frontiers in Psychology, 5(1255).
- Porter, Adam (10 June 2005). "'Peak oil' enters mainstream debate". BBC News.
- Ariel Schwartz (9 February 2011). "WikiLeaks May Have Just Confirmed That Peak Oil Is Imminent". Fast Company.
- Matthew Schneider-Mayerson (2013). "From politics to prophecy: environmental quiescence and the peak-oil movement" (PDF). Environmental Politics.

=== Documentary films ===
- The End of Suburbia: Oil Depletion and the Collapse of the American Dream (2004)
- A Crude Awakening: The Oil Crash (2006)
- The Power of Community: How Cuba Survived Peak Oil (2006)
- Crude Impact (2006)
- What a Way to Go: Life at the End of Empire (2007)
- Crude (2007) Australian Broadcasting Corporation documentary [3 x 30 minutes] about the formation of oil, and humanity's use of it
- PetroApocalypse Now? (2008)
- Blind Spot (2008)
- GasHole (2008)
- Collapse (2009)
- Peak Oil: A Staggering Challenge to "Business As Usual"

=== Podcasts ===
- Saudi America? – The U.S. Oil Boom in Perspective
- KunstlerCast 275 — Art Berman Clarifies Whatever Happened to Peak Oil
