= Predicting the timing of peak oil =

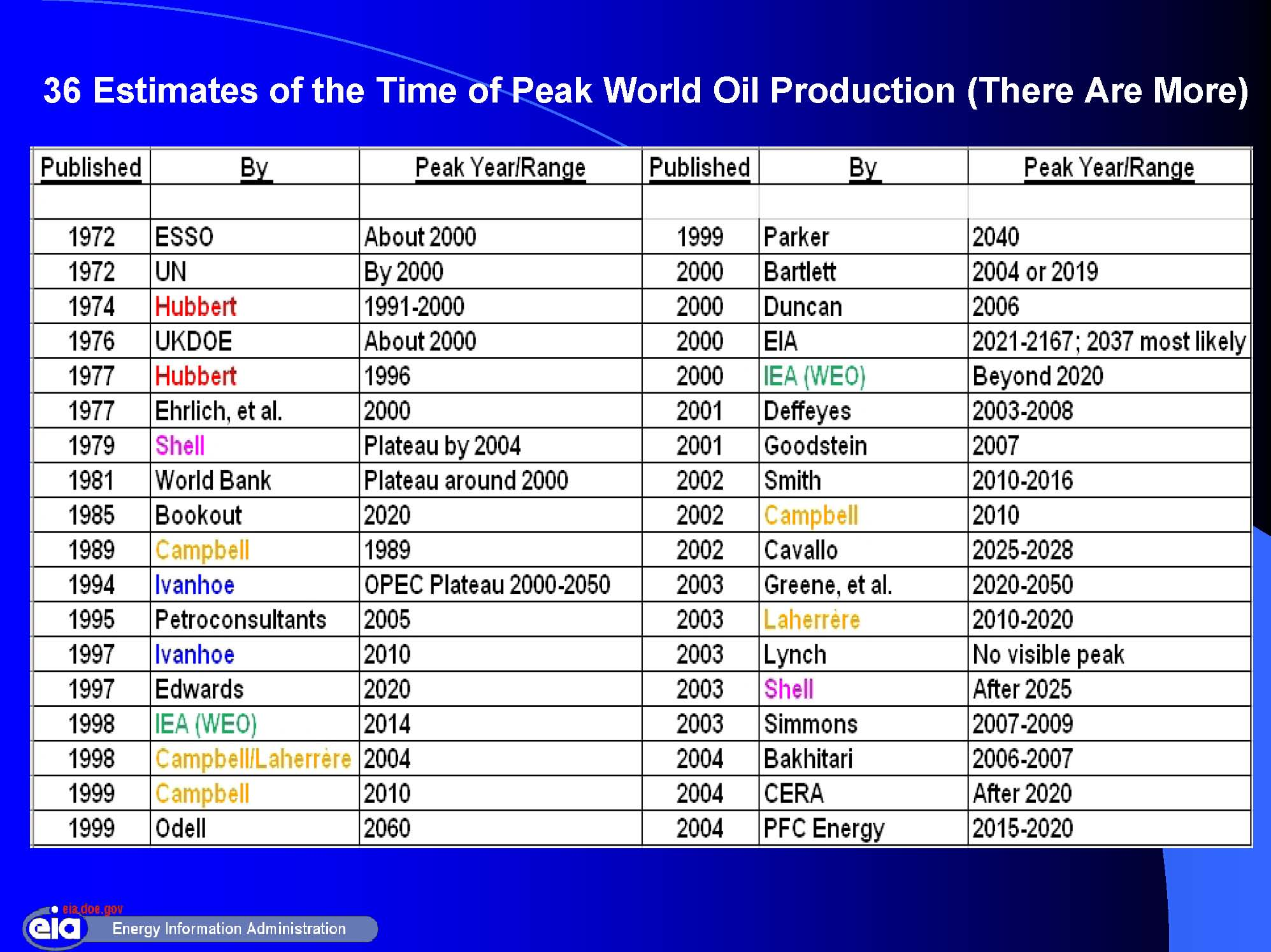
36 estimates made in 2005 of the year of peak world oil production (US EIA)

Predicting the timing of peak oil involves estimation of future production from existing oil fields as well as future discoveries. The initial production model was Hubbert peak theory, first proposed in the 1950s. Since then, many experts have tried to forecast peak oil.

== Present range of predictions ==
As of 2024, the International Energy Agency predicts that peak oil will happen by 2030, while the US Energy Information Administration forecasts a peak in 2050 and the OPEC does not see a peak in oil demand before 2050.

== Past predictions ==
=== 1880s–1940s ===
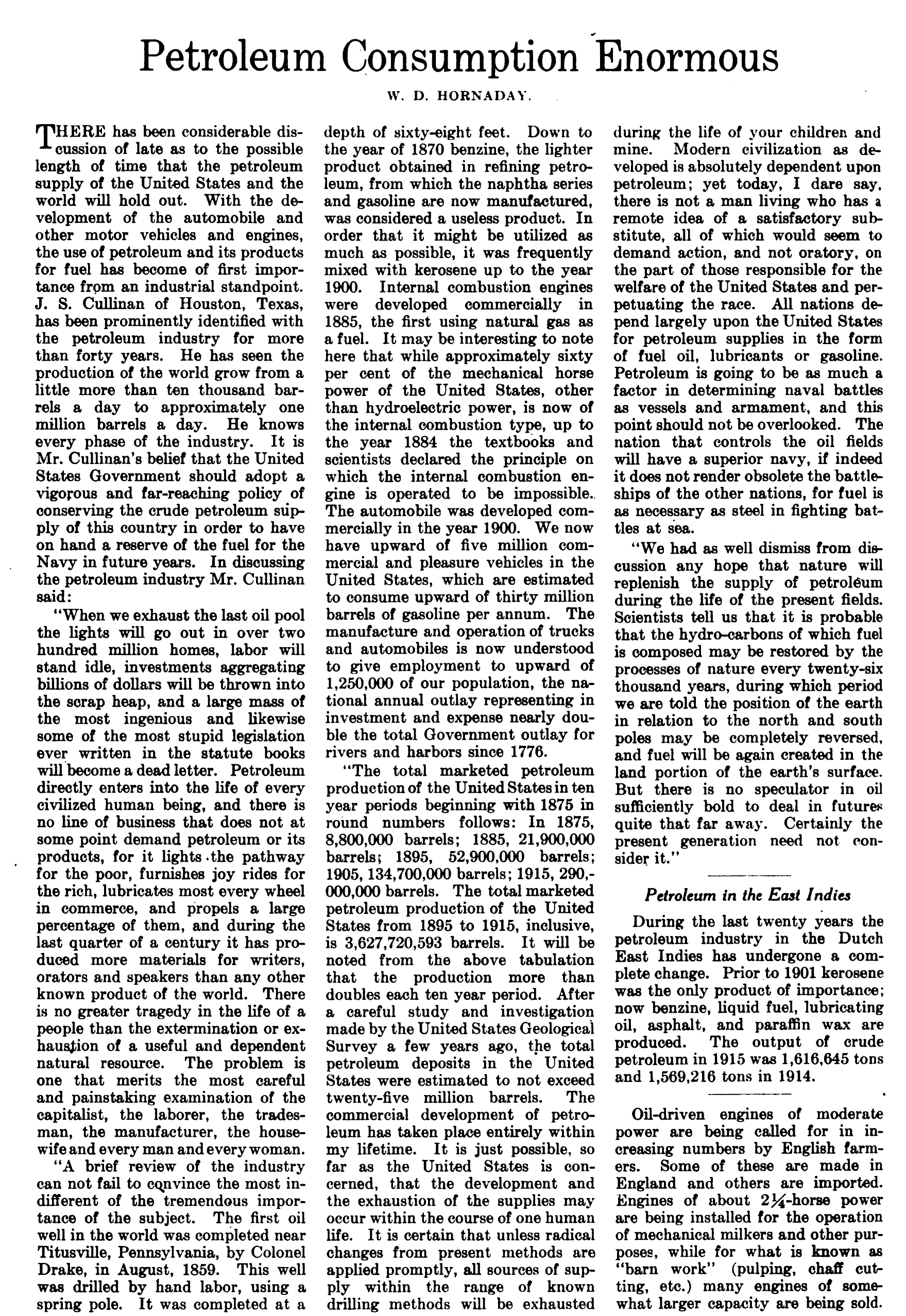
"Petroleum consumption enormous", article in Tractor and Gas Engine Review, 1918.

The idea that human use of petroleum faces sustainability limits attracted practical concern at least as early as the 1880s, as did the related idea that the timing of those limits depends on the extraction technology. The concept of exhausting a natural resource to a point of diminishing returns had some antecedent examples. During the same decades when the modern petroleum industry was launching, the New England whale oil industry had just experienced a peak and was grappling with decline.

Economist and oil analyst Daniel Yergin notes that the first predictions of imminent oil peaks go back to the 1880s, when some American experts believed that exhaustion of the Pennsylvania oil fields would kill the US oil industry. Another wave of peak predictions occurred after World War I.

"... the peak of production will soon be passed, possibly within 3 years. ... There are many well-informed geologists and engineers who believe that the peak in the production of natural petroleum in this country will be reached by 1921 and who present impressive evidence that it may come even before 1920."

- David White, chief geologist, United States Geological Survey (1919)

"The average middle-aged man of today will live to see the virtual exhaustion of the world's supply of oil from wells,"

- Victor C. Anderson, president of the Colorado School of Mines (1921)

A correspondent named W.D. Hornaday, quoting oil industry executive J.S. Cullinan, described the concerns in a 1918 article for Tractor and Gas Engine Review titled "Petroleum consumption enormous." The article said, "There has been considerable discussion of late as to the possible length of time that the petroleum supply of the United States and the world will hold out." The article quoted Cullinan as saying, "It is just possible, so far as the United States is concerned, that the development and the exhaustion of the supplies may occur within the course of one human life. It is certain that unless radical changes from present methods are applied promptly, all sources of supply within the range of known drilling methods will be exhausted during the life of your children and mine." It turned out that radical changes from 1910s drilling methods were, in fact, applied promptly, and thus, the predicted timeframe was premature; but the underlying concerns (that the vastness of consumption would lead to shortages soon enough to worry about, regardless of the exact decade) did not disappear.

=== Hubbert's model ===
A logistic distribution shaped world oil production curve, peaking at 12.5 billion barrels per year about the year 2000, as originally proposed by M. King Hubbert in 1956

In 1956, M. King Hubbert created and first used the models behind peak oil to predict that United States oil production would peak between 1965 and 1971.

In 1956, Hubbert calculated that the world held an ultimate cumulative of 1.25 trillion barrels, of which 124 billion had already been produced. He projected that world oil production would peak at about 12.5 billion barrels per year, sometime around the year 2000. He repeated the prediction in 1962. World oil production surpassed his predicted peak in 1967 and kept rising; world oil production did not peak on or near the year 2000, and for the year 2012 was 26.67 billion barrels, more than twice the peak rate Hubbert had projected back in 1956.

Hubbert's 1956 peak projection for the United States depended on geological estimates of ultimate recoverable oil resources, but starting in his 1962 publication, he concluded that ultimate oil recovery was an output of his mathematical analysis, rather than an assumption. He regarded his peak oil calculation as independent of reserve estimates.

In 1956, Hubbert confined his peak oil prediction to that crude oil "producible by methods now in use." By 1962, however, his analyses included future improvements in exploration and production. All of Hubbert's analyses of peak oil specifically excluded oil manufactured from oil shale or mined from oil sands. A 2013 study predicting an early peak excluded deepwater oil, tight oil, oil with API gravity less than 17.5, and oil close to the poles, such as that on the North Slope of Alaska, all of which it defined as non-conventional.

In 1962, Hubbert predicted that world oil production would peak at a rate of 12.5 billion barrels per year, around the year 2000. In 1974, Hubbert predicted that peak oil would occur in 1995 "if current trends continue". Those predictions proved incorrect.

In 1974, Hubbert again predicted that world peak oil would occur near 2000, this time in 1995 "if current trends continue." However, in the late 1970s and early 1980s, global oil consumption actually dropped (due to the shift to energy-efficient cars, the shift to electricity and natural gas for heating, and other factors), then rebounded with a lower rate of growth in the mid 1980s. Thus oil production did not peak in 1995, and has climbed to more than double the rate initially projected.

=== 2000s ===
In 2001, Kenneth S. Deffeyes, professor emeritus of geology at Princeton University, used Hubbert's theory to predict that world oil production would peak about 2005, with a possible range of 2003 to 2006. He used the observed growth of production plus reserves to calculate ultimate world oil production of 2.12 trillion barrels, noting: "No educated guesses go in." He considered the application of new technology, but wrote: "This much is certain: no initiative put in place starting today can have a substantial effect on the peak production year." His final conclusion was: "There is nothing plausible that could postpone the peak until 2009. Get used to it." As of late 2009, Deffeyes was still convinced that 2005 had been the peak, and wrote: "I think it unlikely that oil production will ever climb back to the 2005 levels."

The term "peak oil" was popularized by Colin Campbell and Kjell Aleklett in 2002 when they helped form the Association for the Study of Peak Oil and Gas (ASPO). Hubbert used the terms "peak production rate" and "peak in the rate of discoveries" in his publications.

According to Matthew Simmons, former chairman of Simmons & Company International and author of Twilight in the Desert: The Coming Saudi Oil Shock and the World Economy, "peaking is one of these fuzzy events that you only know clearly when you see it through a rear view mirror, and by then an alternate resolution is generally too late." On October 26, 2006 Simmons said that global oil production may have peaked in December 2005, though he cautioned that further monitoring of production is required to determine if a peak has actually occurred.

Phibro statistics show that major oil companies hit peak production in 2005. Fatih Birol, chief economist at the International Energy Agency, stated in 2011 that "crude oil production for the world has already peaked in 2006."

Several sources in 2006 and 2007 predicted that worldwide production was at or past its maximum. However, in 2013 OPEC's figures showed that world crude oil production and remaining proven reserves were at record highs.

In a 2006 analysis of Hubbert theory, it was noted that uncertainty in real world oil production amounts and confusion in definitions increases the uncertainty in general of production predictions. By comparing the fit of various other models, it was found that Hubbert's methods yielded the closest fit overall but none of the models were very accurate. In 1956 Hubbert himself recommended using "a family of possible production curves" when predicting a production peak and decline curve.

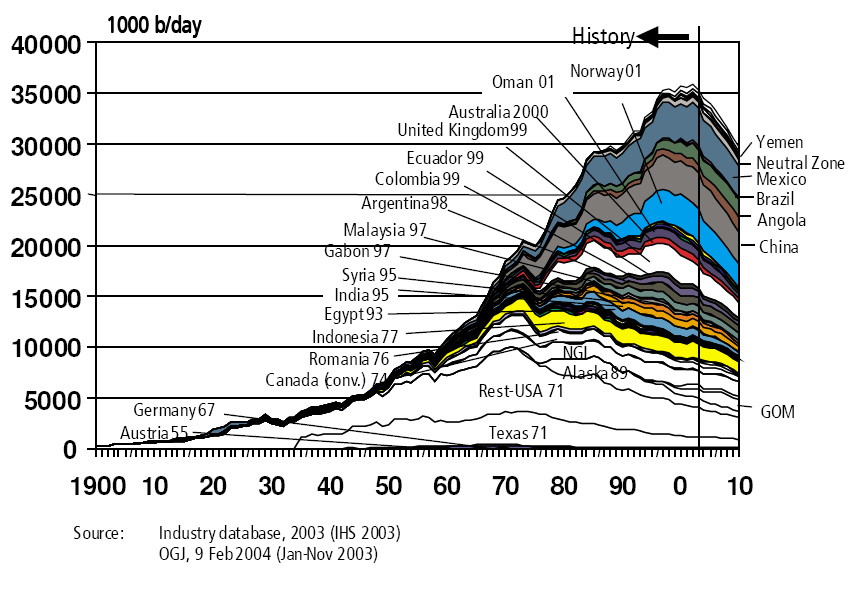
2004 U.S. government predictions for oil production other than in OPEC and the former Soviet Union

The July 2007 IEA Medium-Term Oil Market Report projected a 2% non-OPEC liquids supply growth in 2007-2009, reaching 51.0 kbbl/d (8,110 m^{3}/d) in 2008, receding thereafter as the slate of verifiable investment projects diminishes. They refer to this decline as a plateau. The report expects only a small amount of supply growth from OPEC producers, with 70% of the increase coming from Saudi Arabia, the UAE, and Angola as security and investment issues continue to impinge on oil exports from Iraq, Nigeria and Venezuela.

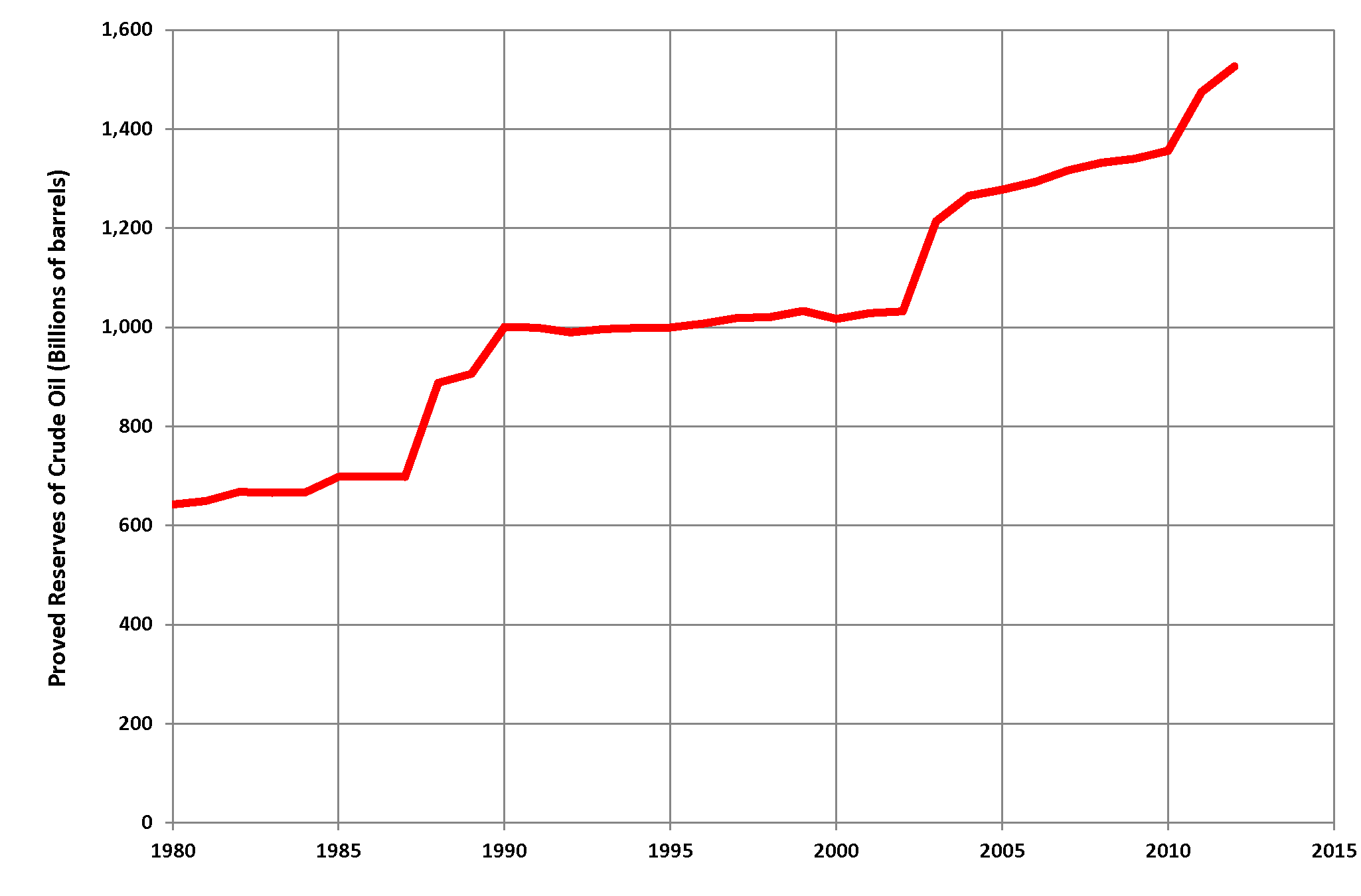
World proved reserves of crude oil, 1980-2012 (US EIA)

In October 2007, the Energy Watch Group, a German research group founded by MP Hans-Josef Fell, released a report claiming that oil production peaked in 2006 and would decline by several percent annually. The authors predicted negative economic effects and social unrest as a result. They stated that the IEA production plateau prediction uses purely economic models, which rely on an ability to raise production and discovery rates at will.

Sadad Ibrahim Al Husseini, former head of Saudi Aramco's production and exploration, stated in an October 29, 2007 interview that oil production had likely already reached its peak in 2006, and that assumptions by the IEA and EIA of production increases by OPEC to over 45 kbbl/d (7,200 m^{3}/d) are "quite unrealistic." Data from the United States Energy Information Administration show that world production leveled out in 2004, and an October 2007 retrospective report by the Energy Watch Group concluded that this data showed the peak of conventional oil production in the third quarter of 2006.

ASPO predicted in their January 2008 newsletter that the peak in all oil (including non-conventional sources), would occur in 2010. This is earlier than the July 2007 newsletter prediction of 2011. ASPO Ireland in its May 2008 newsletter, number 89, revised its depletion model and advanced the date of the peak of overall liquids from 2010 to 2007.

Texas alternative energy activist and oilman T. Boone Pickens stated in 2005 that worldwide conventional oil production was very close to peaking. On June 17, 2008, in testimony before the U.S. Senate Energy and Natural Resources Committee, Pickens stated that "I do believe you have peaked out at 85 million barrels a day globally."

The UK Industry Taskforce on Peak Oil and Energy Security (ITPOES) reported in late October 2008 that peak oil is likely to occur by 2013. ITPOES consists of eight companies: Arup, FirstGroup, Foster + Partners, Scottish and Southern Energy, Solarcentury, Stagecoach Group, Virgin Group, and Yahoo. Their report includes a chapter written by Shell corporation.

In October 2009, a report published by the Government-supported UK Energy Research Centre, following 'a review of over 500 studies, analysis of industry databases and comparison of global supply forecasts', concluded that 'a peak in conventional oil production before 2030 appears likely and there is a significant risk of a peak before 2020'. The authors believe this forecast to be valid 'despite the large uncertainties in the available data'. The study was claimed to be the first to undertake an 'independent, thorough and systematic review of the evidence and arguments in the 'peak oil' debate'. The authors noted that 'forecasts that delay a peak in conventional oil production until after 2030 are at best optimistic and at worst implausible' and warn of the risk that 'rising oil prices will encourage the rapid development of carbon-intensive alternatives that will make it difficult or impossible to prevent dangerous climate change and that 'early investment in low-carbon alternatives to conventional oil is of considerable importance' in avoiding this scenario.

In 2009, a number of industry leaders and analysts believed that world oil production would peak between 2015 and 2030, with a significant chance that the peak would occur before 2020. They consider dates after 2030 implausible. By comparison, a 2014 analysis of production and reserve data predicted a peak in oil production about 2035. Determining a more specific range is difficult due to the lack of certainty over the actual size of world oil reserves. Unconventional oil is not currently predicted to meet the expected shortfall even in a best-case scenario. For unconventional oil to fill the gap without "potentially serious impacts on the global economy", oil production would have to remain stable after its peak, until 2035 at the earliest.

Non-'peakists' can be divided into several different categories based on their specific criticism of peak oil. Some claim that any peak will not come soon or have a dramatic effect on the world economies. Others claim we will not reach a peak for technological reasons, while still others claim our oil reserves are quickly regenerated abiotically.

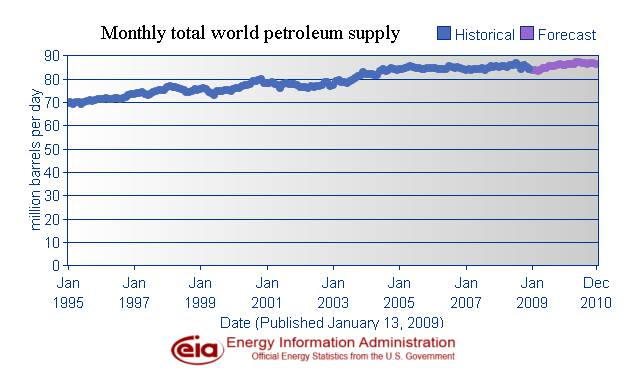
Monthly world oil supply data from 1995 to 2008. Supply is defined as crude oil production (including lease condensates), natural gas plant liquids, other liquids, including biofuels, and refinery processing gains.

CERA, which counts unconventional sources in reserves while discounting EROEI, believes that global production will eventually follow an "undulating plateau" for one or more decades before declining slowly. In 2005 the group predicted that "petroleum supplies will be expanding faster than demand over the next five years."

In 2007, The Wall Street Journal reported that "a growing number of oil-industry chieftains" believed that oil production would soon reach a ceiling for a variety of reasons, and plateau at that level for some time. Several chief executives stated that projections of over 100 million barrels (16,000,000 m^{3}) of production per day are unrealistic, contradicting the projections of the International Energy Agency and United States Energy Information Administration.

It has been argued that even a "plateau oil" scenario may cause political and economic disruption due to increasing petroleum demand and price volatility.

==== Energy Information Administration and USGS 2000 reports ====
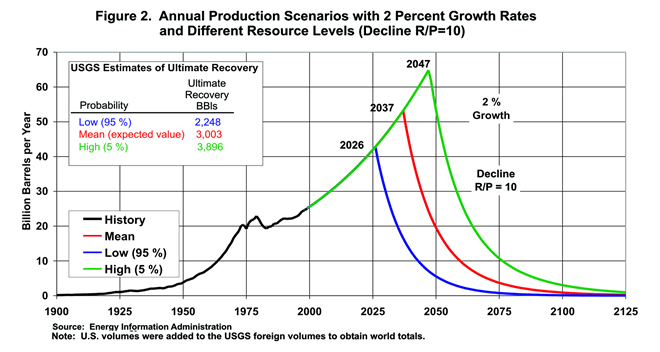
Peak world oil scenarios by the US Energy Information Administration (2004)

The United States Energy Information Administration projects (as of 2006) world consumption of oil to increase to 98.3 million barrels per day (15.63×10^{6} m^{3}/d) in 2015 and 118 million barrels per day (18.8×10^{6} m^{3}/d) in 2030. This would require a more than 35 percent increase in world oil production by 2030. A 2004 paper by the Energy Information Administration based on data collected in 2000 disagrees with Hubbert peak theory on several points. It:

- explicitly incorporates demand into model as well as supply
- does not assume pre/post-peak symmetry of production levels
- models pre- and post-peak production with different functions (exponential growth and constant reserves-to-production ratio, respectively)
- assumes reserve growth, including via technological advancement and exploitation of small reservoirs

The EIA estimates of future oil supply are disagreed with by Sadad Ibrahim Al Husseini, a retired Vice President of Exploration of Aramco, who called it a 'dangerous over-estimate'. Husseini also pointed out that population growth and the emergence of China and India means oil prices are now going to be structurally higher than they have been.

Colin Campbell argued that the 2000 United States Geological Survey (USGS) estimates was a methodologically flawed study that has done incalculable damage by misleading international agencies and governments. Campbell dismisses the notion that the world can seamlessly move to more difficult and expensive sources of oil and gas when the need arises. He argued that oil is in profitable abundance or not there at all, due ultimately to the fact that it is a liquid concentrated by nature in a few places that possess the right geological conditions. Campbell believes OPEC countries raised their reserves to get higher oil quotas and to avoid internal critique. He has also pointed out that the USGS failed to extrapolate past discovery trends in the world's mature basins. He concluded (2002) that peak production was "imminent." Campbell's own record is that he successively predicted that the peak in world production would occur in 1989, 2004, and 2010.

==== IEA World Energy Outlook and British Petroleum ====
The 2008 World Energy Outlook of the International Energy Agency suggested that there was sufficient oil supply to meet demand at reasonable prices for the foreseeable future. This was critiqued by K. Aleklett and M. Höök, but their critique has itself been accused of bias towards non-representative depletion rates, with the result that their figures are ill-founded. Subsequent research clarified more on depletion rates and different ways to define them, but still showed that it rests on solid scientific ground. Ultimately, much of the criticism raised by Uppsala has been addressed and corrected for by the IEA as the same group has thoroughly reviewed oil projections in the IEA World Energy Outlook while remaining uncertainties are chiefly attributable to OPEC and unconventional oil .

According to the World Energy Outlook 2010, conventional crude oil production peaked in 2006, with an all-time maximum of 70 million barrels per day. In September 2020 BP stated their belief (as reported by Bloomberg) that 2019 would be the all-time global liquid fossil fuel production peak. If true, the collapse in demand due to the Covid pandemic from early 2020, the acceleration of previous trends (e.g. electric vehicle adoption), and the deteriorating economics of oil production from large existing fields would all have contributed to making 2019 the peak year.

=== 2010s ===
Papers published since 2010 have been relatively pessimistic. A 2010 Kuwait University study predicted production would peak in 2014. A 2010 Oxford University study predicted that production would peak before 2015, but its projection of a change soon "... from a demand-led market to a supply constrained market ..." was incorrect. A 2014 validation of a significant 2004 study in the journal Energy proposed that it is likely that conventional oil production peaked, according to various definitions, between 2005 and 2011. A set of models published in a 2014 Ph.D. thesis predicted that a 2012 peak would be followed by a drop in oil prices, which in some scenarios could turn into a rapid rise in prices thereafter. According to energy blogger Ron Patterson, the peak of world oil production was probably around 2010.

On the other hand, the US Energy Information Administration projected in 2014 that world production of "total liquids," which, in addition to liquid petroleum, includes biofuels, natural gas liquids, and oil sands, would increase at an average rate of about one percent per year through 2040 without peaking. OPEC countries are expected to increase oil production at a faster rate than non-OPEC countries.

Given the large range offered by meta-studies, papers published since 2010 have been relatively pessimistic. A 2010 Kuwait University study predicted production would peak in 2014. A 2010 Oxford University study predicted that production will peak before 2015. A 2014 validation of a significant 2004 study in the journal Energy proposed that it is likely that conventional oil production peaked, according to various definitions, between 2005 and 2011. Models which show a continued increase in oil production may be including both conventional and non-conventional oil. A set of models published in a 2014 Ph.D. thesis predicted that a 2012 peak would be followed by a drop in oil prices, which in some scenarios could turn into a rapid rise in prices thereafter.

There was a consensus between industry leaders and analysts that world oil production would peak between 2010 and 2030, with a significant chance that the peak will occur before 2020. Dates after 2030 were considered implausible by some. Determining a more specific range is difficult due to the lack of certainty over the actual size of world oil reserves. Unconventional oil is not currently predicted to meet the expected shortfall even in a best-case scenario. For unconventional oil to fill the gap without "potentially serious impacts on the global economy", oil production would have to remain stable after its peak, until 2035 at the earliest.

=== 2020s ===
An October 2021 article by Fortune journalist Sophie Mellor predicts that 2025 will mark peak oil demand, though mentioned that the International Energy Agency stressed trillions of dollars in renewable energy investment.

In January 2023, a report by BP predicted that the world will sharply reduce its reliance on oil and gas, over the next 25 years. Elon Musk disagreed and said this would most likely happen in the next 5 years.

The International Energy Agency in 2025 predicted that peak oil demand would occur in 2029, followed by a slight fall in global demand in 2030.

== No peak oil ==
The view that oil extraction will never enter a depletion phase is often referred to as "cornucopian" in ecology and sustainability literature.

Abdullah S. Jum'ah, President, Director and CEO of Saudi Aramco states that the world has adequate reserves of conventional and nonconventional oil sources that will last for more than a century. As recently as 2008 he pronounced "We have grossly underestimated mankind's ability to find new reserves of petroleum, as well as our capacity to raise recovery rates and tap fields once thought inaccessible or impossible to produce." Jum'ah believes that in-place conventional and non-conventional liquid resources may ultimately total between 13 trillion and 16 trillion barrels (2,500 km^{3}) and that only a small fraction (1.1 trillion) has been extracted to date.

I do not believe the world has to worry about 'peak oil' for a very long time.

— Abdullah S. Jum'ah, 2008-01

Economist Michael Lynch says that the Hubbert peak theory is flawed and that there is no imminent peak in oil production. He argued in 2004 that production is determined by demand as well as geology, and that fluctuations in oil supply are due to political and economic effects as well as the physical processes of exploration, discovery and production. This idea is echoed by Jad Mouawad, who explains that as oil prices rise, new extraction technologies become viable, thus expanding the total recoverable oil reserves. This, according to Mouwad, is one explanation of the changes in peak production estimates.

Leonardo Maugeri, the former group senior vice president, Corporate Strategies of Eni S.p.A., dismissed the peak oil thesis in a 2004 policy position piece in Science as "the current model of oil doomsters," and based on several flawed assumptions. He characterized the peak oil theory as part of a series of "recurring oil panics" that have "driven Western political circles toward oil imperialism and attempts to assert direct or indirect control over oil-producing regions". Maugeri claimed the geological structure of the earth has not been explored thoroughly enough to conclude that the declining trend in discoveries, which began in the 1960s, will continue. He also stated that complete global oil production, discovery trends, and geological data are not available globally.

Economist and oil analyst Daniel Yergin criticizes Hubbert peak oil theory for ignoring the effects of both economics and improved technology. Yergin believes that world oil production will continue to rise until "perhaps sometime around mid-century" and then "plateau" or enter a gradual decline. He considers it possible that declining oil production, when it comes, will be caused less by resource scarcity than by lower demand brought about by improved efficiency.

== Peak oil for individual nations ==
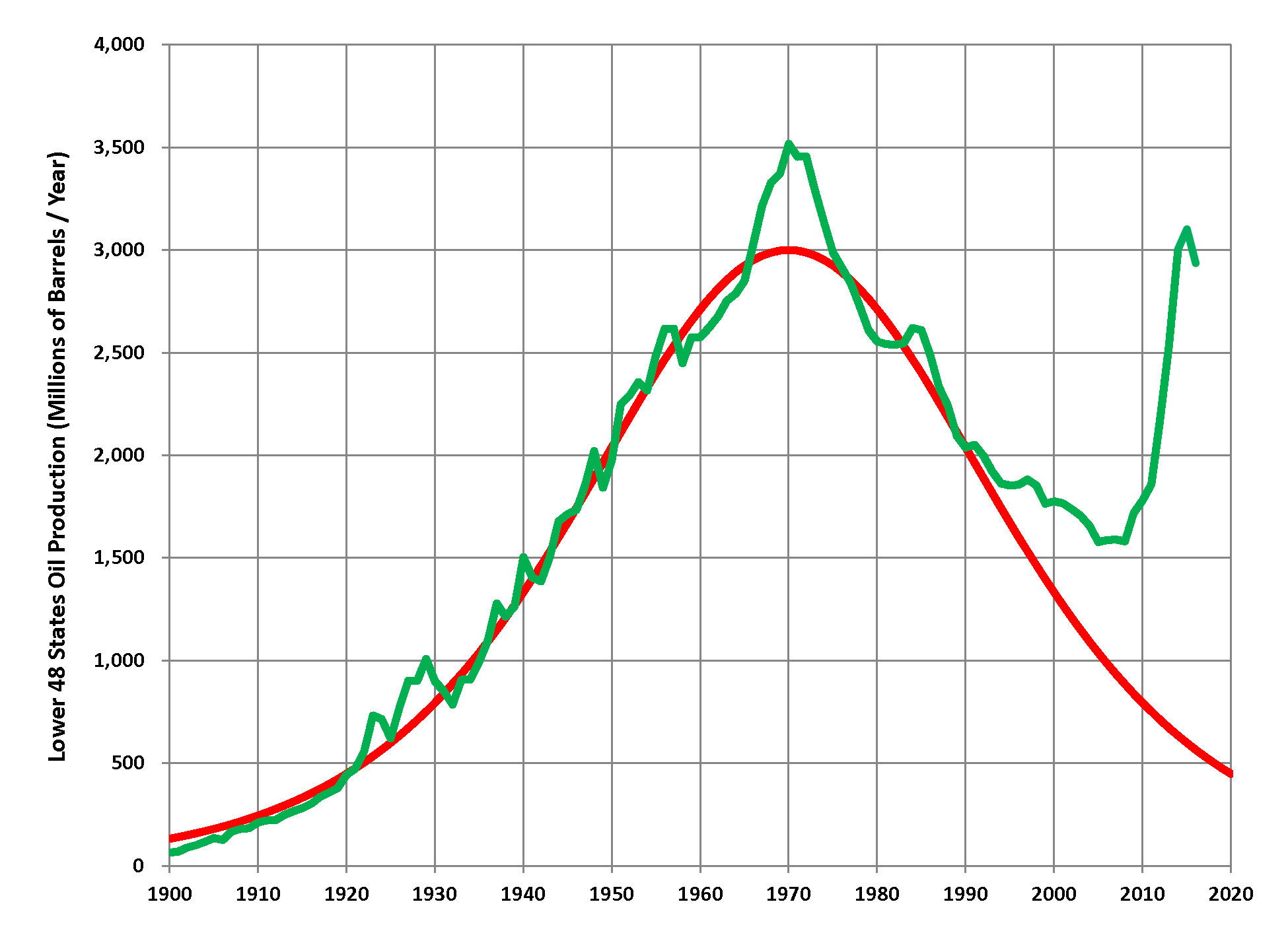
Hubbert's upper-bound prediction for US crude oil production (1956), and actual lower-48 states production through 2014

Norway's oil production and a Hubbert curve approximating it.

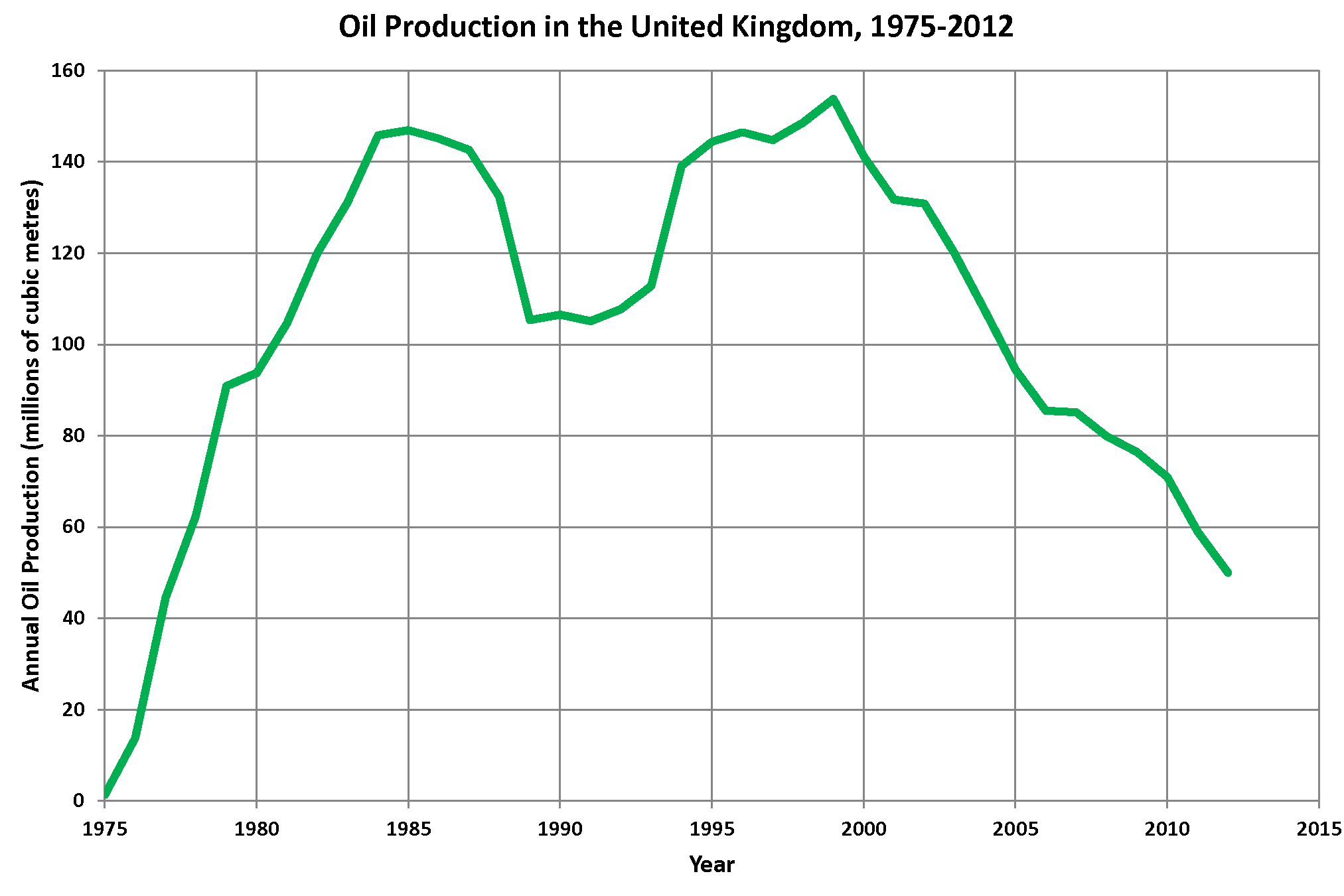
United Kingdom oil production 1975-2012 (data from DECC)

Canadian conventional oil production peaked in 1973, but oil sands production will increase to at least 2020

Peak oil as a concept applies globally, but it is based on the summation of individual nations experiencing peak oil. In State of the World 2005, Worldwatch Institute observed that oil production was in decline in 33 of the 48 largest oil-producing countries. Other countries have also passed their individual oil production peaks.

The following list shows some oil-producing nations and their peak oil production years.

- Algeria: 2006
- Angola: 2008
- Argentina: 2001
- Azerbaijan: 2010
- Australia: 2000
- China: 2015
- Egypt: 1987
- Denmark: 2004
- France: 1988
- Germany: 1966
- India: 2011
- Iran: 1974
- Indonesia: 1991
- Libya: 1970 (disputed)
- Malaysia: 2004
- Mexico: 2003
- New Zealand: 2008
- Nigeria: 1979
- Norway: 2000
- Oman: 2000
- Peru: 1982, with an additional peak possible if the Amazon is drilled
- Qatar: 2007
- Syria: 1996
- Tobago: 1981
- UK: 1999
- Venezuela: 1970

Peak oil production has not been reached in the following nations (and is estimated in a 2010 Kuwait University study to occur in the following years):

- Iraq: 2036
- Kazakhstan: 2020
- Kuwait: 2033
- Saudi Arabia: 2027

An ABC television program in 2006 predicted that Russia would hit peak in 2010, it has continued to rise through 2016.

== See also ==
- Hubbert peak theory
- Petroleum
- Hubbert linearization
