= Magic number =

Magic number may refer to:

== Science and technology ==
- Magic number (chemistry), number of atoms or molecules forming an exceptionally stable cluster
- Magic number (physics), the number of nucleons that results in completely filled nuclear shells
- Magic number (programming), either a unique identifier or a literal with unexplained meaning

== TV ==
- Magic Numbers (game show), British 2010 television game show
- Magic Number (game), a pricing game on The Price is Right
- Magic Numbers or Hannah Fry's Magic Numbers, a 2018 series of episodes about Mathematics, presented by Hannah Fry.

== Music ==
- "Magic Number" (song), a song by Maaya Sakamoto
- "The Magic Number", a 1990 song by De La Soul from 3 Feet High and Rising
- The Magic Numbers, a British rock band
  - The Magic Numbers (album), the debut album by the band

== Other uses ==
- Magic number (sports), a number that indicates how close a team is to winning a season title
- Magic number (oil), the price per barrel of oil at which an oil exporting nation runs a deficit
- Videocart-8: Magic Numbers, a 1977 video game for the Fairchild Channel F

== See also ==
- "The Magical Number Seven, Plus or Minus Two", a 1956 paper by George Miller
- Magic constant, the sum in a magic square
- Numerology, the belief that numbers can have magic properties
