= Crude (2007 film) =

- Directed by: Dr. Richard Smith
- Release date: 2007
- Running time: 90 minutes
- Country: Australia
- Language: English

Crude (2007) is a 90-minute-long feature documentary made by Australian filmmaker Dr Richard Smith attempting to explain the links between formation, extraction and refining as well the link between geology and economy. The film features interviews with oil industry professionals and geologists about the future of oil production and exploration. The interviewed include Dr. Jeremy Leggett, a geologist formerly working with oil exploration for BP and Shell; Dr. Colin Campbell, a retired British petroleum geologist who predicted that oil production would peak by 2007; Lord Ronald Oxburgh, former chairman of Shell; Professor Wallace S. Broecker at Columbia University; and journalist Sonia Shah.

From the ABC's website:

Crude takes a step back from the day to day news to illuminate the Earth's extraordinary carbon cycle and the role of oil in our impending climate crisis. Nearly seven billion people have come to depend on this resource, yet the Oil Age that began less than a century and a half ago, could be over in our lifetimes.

The film won the Best Earth Sciences Program award at the 2007 Jackson Hole Wildlife Film Festival, and director Dr Richard Smith received the American Geophysical Union's "Walter Sullivan Award for Excellence in Science Journalism" in 2008 for this film.
