= PetroApocalypse Now? =

- Directed by: Andrew Evans
- Theme music composer: Marco Lenzi, Bim Sturdy, KLUtCh, Grand Agent
- Country of origin: United Kingdom
- Original language: English

Production
- Running time: 48 minutes

Original release
- Release: 2008

PetroApocalypse Now? is a 2008 documentary television film about the future of global oil production and peak oil.

== Overview ==
PetroApocalypse Now? examines the arguments surrounding peak oil from both sides of the debate. It dissects the points of view of the oil industry and governments, who believe peak oil is a long way off, and meets the experts from the Association for the Study of Peak Oil and Gas who believe global oil production will begin to decline very soon. Notably, it exposes the evidence surrounding the exaggeration of the oil reserves in Kuwait by travelling there to meet former MP Abdullah Al-Nibari.

== Broadcasters ==
The film was broadcast by CBC Newsworld in Canada as Oil: Apocalypse Now?. It has also been broadcast by Ushuaia TV in France, Metro TV in Indonesia, SVT in Sweden, PBS in the US.
