= GasHole =

- Directed by: Scott D. Roberts; Jeremy Wagener
- Produced by: Film Racket; Braint Media; JK Productions
- Starring: Peter Gallagher (narrator)
- Distributed by: Cinema Libre Studio; Cinemavault Releasing
- Release date: April 18, 2010
- Running time: 102 minutes
- Country: United States
- Language: English
- Budget: $495,000 (estimated)

GasHole is a documentary film about the history of oil prices and the future of alternative fuels. The film was completed in 2008, premiered and released directly to DVD in 2010. The film details the dependency of the United States on foreign supplies of oil. The documentary is directed by Scott D. Roberts and Jeremy Wagener and narrated by Peter Gallagher.

== Plot ==
The movie begins showing video clips of speeches by presidents from Nixon to George W. Bush talking about how the United States needs to be less dependent on other countries for oil. Nixon even says that he wants to break the oil companies.

Next the movie talks about a "water-injected" 1946 Buick Roadmaster that got 100 miles per gallon of gasoline. The gas was humidified and the pressure increased to get better mileage. The movie states that Shell Oil bought this idea and asked if they buried it. In 1977 the book Fuel Economy of the Gas Engine by Shell scientists states that they got 150 mpg in a 1947 Studebaker. On May 1, 1977, The El Paso Times ran a front-page article with the headline "200 Miles on 2 Gallons of Gas". Tom Ogle, the subject of the article, was found in the desert, dead from a drug overdose, and his car disappeared. The movie does not make any effort to ascertain the veracity of the water-injected engine or other facts.

After Hurricane Katrina, the energy committees in both the Senate and the House hold hearings about the sudden rise in gasoline prices, the first time that they have gone over $3 per gallon. One Congressman asks if the oil companies are taking advantage. One chairman of a committee decides not to swear in the CEOs of the oil companies, alleviating them of the requirement to tell the truth. Senator Gordon H. Smith, R-Ore., observes that no Gulf crude is used on the West Coast, yet gas prices spiked there as well. On November 10, 2005, the Chevron Oil Company is quoted as saying, "If the U.S. petroleum industry doesn't reduce its refining capacity, it will never see any substantial increase in refining margins." Representative Nancy Pelosi, D-Cal., states in a committee hearing that Shell is closing a refinery in California that produces 2% of the gas used in the state, that it is Shell's most profitable refinery, and that Shell's claims that the refinery has no buyers, is not reliable and not making money are all not true, that Shell wants to control the supply of gas in order to increase profits.

On May 11, 2006, during the House Energy Committee meeting, Representative Anna Eshoo, D-Cal., asks why, if Exxon is not building in the U.S., are they looking for new ways to invest record profits. Joe Barton, R-Tex., the committee's chairman, answers that it is a low blow to use what ExxonMobil actually said against them. Next he is seen stating that as long as he is chairman, global warming is off the table. Since 1990 the oil companies have given $49 million to Democrats and $150 million to Republicans. Since January 2001 when George W. Bush became president until May 2007, the average U.S. price of a gallon of gas has risen from $1.47 to $3.12. One person interviewed in the movie questions whether it is a good idea to have both a president and vice president who are close to the oil industry.

== Awards ==
- 2009: Fort Lauderdale International Film Festival, Spirit of the Independent Award

== See also ==
- Peak oil
- Oil reserves
