= Tight oil =

Light crude oil in petroleum-bearing formations

Tight oil (also known as shale oil, shale-hosted oil or light tight oil, abbreviated LTO) is light crude oil contained in unconventional petroleum-bearing formations of low permeability, often shale or tight sandstone. Economic production from tight oil formations requires the same hydraulic fracturing and often uses the same horizontal well technology used in the production of shale gas. While sometimes called "shale oil", tight oil should not be confused with oil shale (shale rich in kerogen) or shale oil (oil produced from oil shales). Therefore, the International Energy Agency recommends using the term "light tight oil" for oil produced from shales or other very low permeability formations, while the World Energy Resources 2013 report by the World Energy Council uses the terms "tight oil" and "shale-hosted oil".

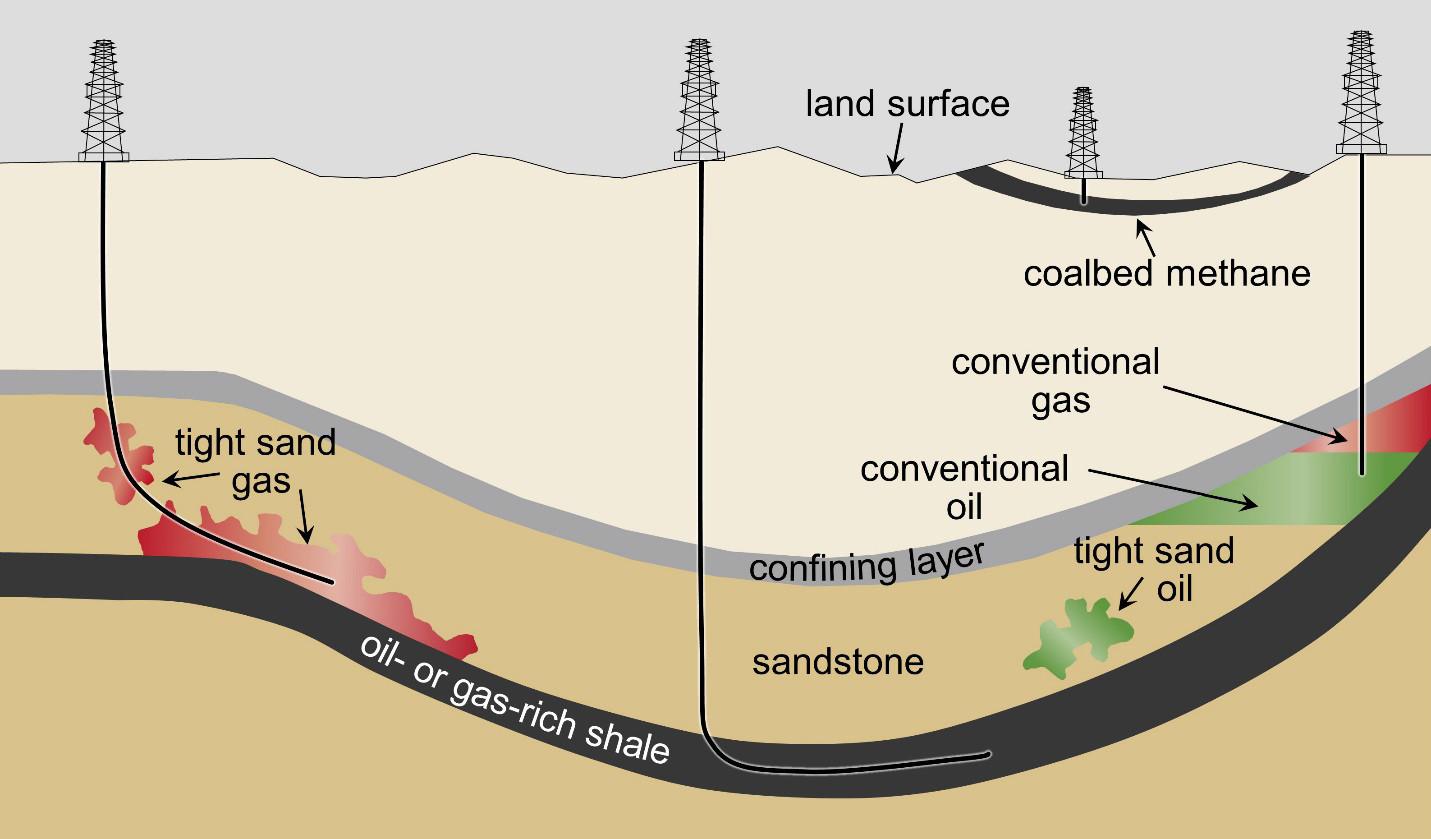
Shown are conceptual illustrations of types of oil and gas wells. A vertical well is producing from a conventional oil and gas deposit (right). Also shown are wells producing from unconventional formations: a vertical coalbed methane well (second from right); a horizontal well producing from a shale formation (center); and a well producing from a tight sand formation (left).

In May 2013 the International Energy Agency in its Medium-Term Oil Market Report (MTOMR) said that the North American oil production surge led by unconventional oils—US light tight oil (LTO) and Canadian oil sands—had produced a global supply shock that would reshape the way oil is transported, stored, refined and marketed.

== Inventory and examples ==
Tight oil formations include the Bakken Shale, the Niobrara Formation, Barnett Shale, and the Eagle Ford Shale in the United States, R'Mah Formation in Syria, Sargelu Formation in the northern Persian Gulf region, Athel Formation in Oman, Bazhenov Formation and Achimov Formation of West Siberia in Russia, Arckaringa Basin in Australia, Chicontepec Formation in Mexico, and the Vaca Muerta oil field in Argentina. In June 2013 the U.S. Energy Information Administration published a global inventory of estimated recoverable tight oil and tight gas resources in shale formations, "Technically Recoverable Shale Oil and Shale Gas Resources: An Assessment of 137 Shale Formations in 41 Countries Outside the United States." The inventory is incomplete due to exclusion of tight oil and gas from sources other than shale such as sandstone or carbonates, formations underlying the large oil fields located in the Middle East and the Caspian region, off shore formations, or about which there is little information. Amounts include only high quality prospects which are likely to be developed.

In 2012, at least 4,000 new producing shale oil (tight oil) wells were brought online in the United States. By comparison, the number of new producing oil and gas wells (both conventional and unconventional) completed in 2012 globally outside the United States and Canada is less than 4,000.

== Characteristics ==
Tight oil shale formations are heterogeneous and vary widely over relatively short distances. Tight oil reservoirs subjected to fracking can be divided into four different groups. Type I has little matrix porosity and permeability – leading to fractures dominating both storage capacity and fluid flow pathways. Type II has low matrix porosity and permeability, but here the matrix provides storage capacity while fractures provide fluid-flow paths. Type III are microporous reservoirs with high matrix porosity but low matrix permeability, thus giving induced fractures dominance in fluid-flow paths. Type IV is macroporous reservoirs with high matrix porosity and permeability, thus the matrix provides both storage capacity and flow paths while fractures only enhance permeability.

Even in a single horizontal drill hole, the amount recovered may vary, as may recovery within a field or even between adjacent wells. This makes evaluation of plays and decisions regarding the profitability of wells on a particular lease difficult. Production of oil from tight formations requires at least 15 to 20 percent natural gas in the reservoir pore space to drive the oil toward the borehole; tight reservoirs which contain only oil cannot be economically produced. Formations which formed under marine conditions contain less clay and are more brittle, and thus more suitable for fracking than formations formed in fresh water which may contain more clay. Formations with more quartz and carbonate are more brittle.

The natural gas and other volatiles in LTO make it more hazardous to handle, store, and transport. This was an aggravating factor in the series of fatal explosions after the Lac-Mégantic derailment.

== Exploitation ==
Prerequisites for exploitation include being able to obtain rights to drill, easier in the United States and Canada where private owners of subsurface rights are motivated to enter into leases; the availability of expertise and financing, easier in the United States and Canada where there are many independent operators and supporting contractors with critical expertise and suitable drilling rigs; infrastructure to gather and transport oil; and water resources for use in hydraulic fracturing.

Analysts expect that $150 billion will be spent on further developing North American tight oil fields in 2015. The large increase in tight oil production is one of the reasons behind the price drop in late 2014.

Outside the United States and Canada, development of shale oil (tight oil) resources may be limited by the lack of available drilling rigs: 2/3 of the world's active drill rigs are in the US and Canada, and rigs elsewhere are less likely to be equipped for horizontal drilling. Drilling intensity may be another constraint, as tight-oil development requires far more completed wells than does conventional oil. Leonardo Maugeri considers this will be "an insurmountable environmental hurdle in Europe".

Detailed studies on production behaviour in prolific shale plays where light tight oil is produced have shown that the average monthly initial production of a tight oil well is around 500 barrels/day, which yields an estimated ultimate recovery in the range 150-290 thousand barrels. As a consequence, exploitation of tight oil tends to be drilling intensive with many new wells needed to ramp up and maintain production over time.

== Size of tight oil resources ==
=== US EIA estimated technically recoverable tight oil in shale ===
Following are estimates of technically recoverable volumes of tight oil associated with shale formations, made by the US Energy Information Administration in 2013. Not all oil which is technically recoverable may be economically recoverable at current or anticipated prices.

1. Kingdom of Bahrain: 80 billion barrels
2. United States: 78 billion barrels
3. Russia: 75 billion barrels
4. China: 32 billion barrels
5. Argentina: 27 billion barrels
6. Libya: 26 billion barrels
7. Venezuela: 13 billion barrels
8. Mexico: 13 billion barrels
9. Pakistan: 9 billion barrels
10. Canada: 9 billion barrels
11. Indonesia: 8 billion barrels

World Total: 335 to 345 billion barrels

=== Other estimates ===
Australia: A private oil company announced in 2013 that it had discovered tight oil in shale of the Arckaringa Basin, estimated at 3.5 to 223 billion barrels.

== Production ==
In September 2018, the U.S. Energy Information Administration projected October tight oil production in the U.S. at 7.6 million barrels per day.

The volume of oil production on tight oil formations in the US depends significantly on the dynamics of the WTI oil price. About six months after the price change, drilling activity changes, and with it the volume of production. These changes and their expectations are so significant that they themselves affect the price of oil and hence the volume of production in the future. These regularities are described in mathematical language by a differential extraction equation with a delayed argument.

Tight oil differs from conventional oil, as both investment and production dynamics of tight oil is significantly faster than conventional counterparts. This may reduce risks associated with locked-in capital and also contributed to a more flexible production that reduces oil price volatility. Unexpectedly, this faster dynamics can also entail lesser carbon lock-in effects and stranded asset risks with implications for climate policies.

== See also ==
- Shale gas
- Shale oil extraction
- Tight gas
- Unconventional (oil & gas) reservoir
