= Ecoflation =

Postulated future economic scenario

Ecoflation (a portmanteau of "ecological" and "inflation") is a future scenario in "Rattling Supply Chains", a research report by the World Resources Institute and A.T. Kearney, released in November 2008. It is characterized by natural resources becoming scarcer and sustainability issues become more pressing, leading to an increase in the price of commodities. The effects of the increase in the price of commodities are felt by corporations suffering environmental costs being added to their usual cost of doing business. In a 2024 report, ecoflation was distinguished from the narrower concept of climateflation by involving both climate-related and non-climate-related environmental pressures. It was described as inflation arising from ecosystem instability when firms pass higher food, material and energy costs into their prices.

The concept of ecoflation focuses on having environmental externalities of business be the burden of the organization/business responsible, rather than costs being allocated to the general public. Ecoflation represents more accurate pricing of the true costs associated with business actions. The concepts also emphasized the necessity of businesses to be creative and innovative in order to adapt their business models and supply chains to remain competitive on the market. The idea is that the more a business integrates sustainability in their core business principle, the more success they will have.

== Drivers of ecoflation ==
The World Resources Institute and A.T. Kearney identified three main drivers for ecoflation :

=== Scarcity of resources ===
An increase in population and consumption leads to an increased demand for resources, such as wood, oil, water, and grain. Meanwhile, climate change is an increasing threat to such resources, in the form of extreme weather events (wildfires, droughts, floods, etc.) and biodiversity loss. A 2024 study found that higher temperatures increased food inflation but the effects varied by region and season. It was estimated that the extreme heat in Europe in 2022 summer contributed to cumulative annual 0.67 percentage points food inflation. For example, as freshwater levels decline, and the demand keeps rising globally, because of the law of supply and demand, the price of water is bound to rise, some predict by 20% to 30% by 2050. Also in regards to water, agricultural regions are facing droughts and water scarcity from climate change which has led to the increase in production costs. Hydroelectric power plants are one specific area that has been directly affected by water scarcity. Furthermore, palm oil which is commonly in food and personal care products is largely affected by climate change, specifically water scarcity, floods, and fires.

=== Policies ===
Governmental institutions, like the World Economic Forum, European Union, General Agreement on Tariff and Trade are increasingly aware of the necessity to react to climate change, and continue to pass stronger regulations in order to protect the environment. One such regulation is the introduction of carbon emissions trading, which forces companies that pollute more than they are permitted to suffer the cost. These are costs that companies will either have to internalize, decreasing their profit margin, or pass on to the consumer, potentially making them less competitive. Government-enforced carbon fees have a direct impact on transportation prices. The increase in transport costs causes an increase in the price for resources such as sugar. In addition to this, many countries have passed laws banning or limiting the use of plastic bags, according to the United Nations Environment Program. The paper states, “As of July 2018, one hundred and twenty-seven (127) out of 192 countries reviewed (about 66%) have adopted some form of legislation to regulate plastic bags. The first regulatory measures specifically targeting plastic bags were enacted in the early 2000s, gradually increasing throughout the decade, with many countries enacting restrictions in the past few years.”

=== Consumers ===
Consumers are also increasingly asking companies to provide more sustainable goods and services. Adapting to such consumer demands represents a cost for companies to adapt to. For example, companies may commit to using recycled wood material in response to public concerns about deforestation, or reducing plastic, because it comes from fossil fuels. Changes in what consumers buy can create financial risks for businesses. Dafermos and colleagues distinguished between the environmental damage causing rising prices (“ecoflation”) and changes made to protect the environment but also cause rising prices (“transitflation”).

== Addressing ecoflation ==
The risk of ecoflation is not inescapable, and companies can start by taking concrete steps to counteract its effects.

=== Voluntary actions ===
Companies can take voluntary action in order to reduce gas emissions and avoid ecoflation. For example, companies may choose to use less plastic or recycled plastic, or they may modify their distribution system to increase efficiency and decrease both greenhouse gas emissions and costs. Procter & Gamble is one of these companies that is looking at use both less and recycled plastic across their products. In 2018, they announced a sustainability goal for all of their packaging to use recyclable and reusable plastic by 2030. Procter & Gamble takes the lead with their Fabric Care such as Tide, Gain, and Downy which uses 73% recycled packaging. Also, governments may pass laws that force companies to do this as well. One example of this is New Jersey’s passing new laws. Starting May 4, 2022, New Jersey retail stores, grocery stores and food service businesses may not provide or sell single-use plastic carryout bags and polystyrene foam food service products. Single-use paper carryout bags are allowed to be provided or sold, except by grocery stores equal to or larger than 2500 square feet, which may only provide or sell reusable carryout bags. After November 4, 2021, plastic straws may be provided only upon the request of the customer.”

=== Business opportunities ===
Drivers of ecoflation can be business opportunities. As stated by the consulting firm Kearney in their report "The Cost of Ecoflation" : "Leaders in this new landscape will be companies that make environmental sustainability one of their core business principles." In order for business to remain competitive and to emerge as leaders, sustainability is an important factor.

As pointed at the 2020 World Economic Forum Global Risks Report, the five greatest global risks to the economy today are all related to the environment, starting with climate change. Companies will have no choice but to adapt to this reality. Furthermore, the Environmental, Social, and Corporate Governance (ESG) Score rating system has been utilized to address the price impact and other assorted environmental hazard that companies pose in the confines of ecoflation. Investment firms often utilize these metrics to create more diverse portfolios and select more sustainable investments. As stated by Paulina Linkos, former Risk Manager at Fannie Mae, “A favorable ESG score could compel investors to invest in a company, either because investors see the company's values as aligned with their own or because investors view the company as sufficiently shielded from future risks associated with issues such as pollution or poor corporate governance.” As such, there is an incentive to companies that attempt to improve their score, thereby improving the general corporate landscape in environmental factors and cost drivers.

=== Big changes ===
Addressing ecoflation is not a task to be taken lightly, as stated by Andrew Aulisi, a researcher at the World Resource Institute. "You should not make small 'cosmetic' changes, but work with a true vision of the future," he concluded. As ecoflation is intertwined in many other topics, as stated by Darko B. Vukovic and Riad Shams, researchers for the Russian National research University- Higher School of Economics and Newcastle Business School- Northumbria University, “As the governments of many countries (predominantly developed) became increasingly interested in environmental issues, we began to meet more terms that are dedicated to the conservation of the environment, rational use of resources, sustainability, and the economic potential of a particular location (region). As a result of this policy, we often encounter terminology such as: Sustainable development, global ecotrends, green economy, ecotourism, environmental protection, regional issues, technological impact on ecology (or new version of industrial ecology), ecopolitical problems, social responsibility, corporate responsibility, urban sustainability, sustainable tourism, circular economy, etc. In other words, the link between biodiversity, economics, and technological advancement exists in almost all socioeconomic forms.”. As shown by this, any small change in the realm of socioeconomics can impact many other areas of the economy of a given region.

== Impacts of ecoflation on cost drivers ==
=== Methodology ===
For the scenario, the World Resource Institute chose to focus on the industry of Fast-Moving-Consumer-Goods (FMCG), and analyses seven types commodities: oil, natural gas, electricity, cereals & grain & soy, sugar, palm oil, and timber. The first impact in the study was commodity prices, and the study concluded that the price of commodities will be greatly affected by the drivers of ecoflation. The second impact in the study was the “Total Delivered Cost,” and detailed that ecoflation will cause an increase for these companies. The last impact in the study concluded that ecoflation will lead to a decrease of Earnings Before Interest and Tax between 13% and 47% between 2013 and 2018.

== See also ==
- Economic impacts of climate change
- Sustainability
- Inflation accounting
- Effects of climate change
- Resource depletion
