= Oil burden =

Economic statistic

Oil burden is the volume of petroleum consumed, multiplied by the average price, and divided by nominal gross domestic product. This gives the proportion of the world economy devoted to buying oil. It is a concept developed by Veronique Riches-Flores of Société Générale.
