= Magic number (oil) =

Term in Economics

The magic number is a term in economics that denotes the price of crude oil (measured in U.S. dollars per barrel) at which a crude oil exporting economy runs a deficit.

Some countries support almost all spending from income derived from oil exports. As the price of oil drops, these countries take in less revenue from oil. The magic number denotes the point at which the revenue from oil is no longer sufficient to pay for spending. Mathematically, this can be expressed by the inequality:

$$Q \times P > S$$

where Q is the quantity of oil exported, P is the price, and S is spending. The magic number is the value of P at which this inequality no longer holds true — that is, that the economy runs a deficit.

PFC Energy publishes the magic number for all the OPEC nations.

"Qatar is at $21 a barrel, because it brings in much more oil money than it spends. Saudi Arabia's break-even point is at $49 a barrel. And Venezuela is at $58, second only to Nigeria's $65."

== See also ==
- Peak oil
