= Sadad Ibrahim Al Husseini =

Saudi oil and gas industry expert

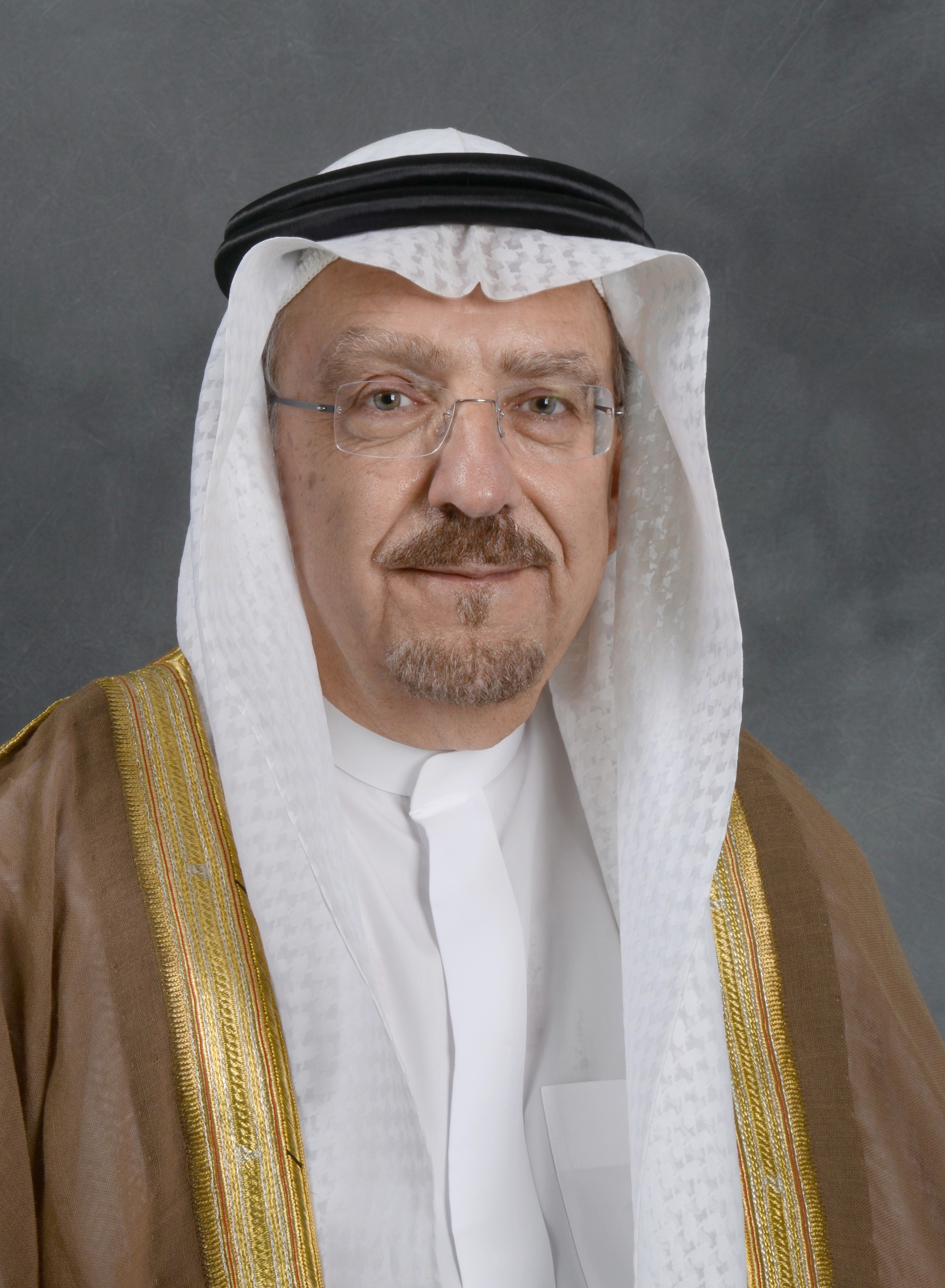
- Sadad Al Husseini
- Born: August 21, 1946 (age 79); Damascus, Independent First Syrian Republic
- Education: American University of Beirut, B.S., 1968; Brown University, M.S, 1970; Brown University, Ph.D., Geological Sciences 1973
- Title: President and CEO, Husseini Energy Company WLL; Senior Energy Consultant to the King Faisal Foundation
- Board member of: Advisory Board, Energy Intelligence Group, 2006 – present
- Spouse: Suad Al Bassam
- Children: 3
- Awards: Order of King Abdulaziz, First Class, 2001.
- Website: www.husseinienergy.com

Sadad Ibrahim Al Husseini (Arabic: سداد إبراهيم آل حسيني) is a leading Saudi oil and gas industry expert. He is most widely known for his achievements during his tenure at Saudi Aramco as the Senior and Executive Vice President for Exploration and Producing, and his current work on supply side risk; referred to by the New York Times as "one of the most respected and accomplished oilmen in the world".

== Summary ==
Sadad Ibrahim Al Husseini is credited with launching the field modernization and state of art reservoir management and development of Saudi Arabia's giant oil fields, the upgrading of the company's drilling, environmental, and upstream safety standards, the discovery and development of its Paleozoic oil and gas reservoirs, the discovery of its Red Sea oil and condensate fields, the initiation of its upstream advanced degree and specialists professional programs, and the development of its leading edge reservoir modelling and simulation capabilities at its purpose built Exploration and Petroleum Engineering Center, EXPEC. In 1988 he launched Aramco's mothballing program for 3.5 million barrels of oil production capacity and in 1990, as a result of the Iraqi invasion of Kuwait, he led the Aramco team that re-activated the mothballed capacity thereby increasing Kingdom's oil production from 5 million bd to 8.5 million bd within six months. In 1994 he launched the intensified non-associated Saudi gas exploration program which increased the Kingdom's non-associated gas reserves by 30 Tcf within 4 years.

In 1996, Al Husseini was called upon by HM King Abdullah ibn Abdul Aziz to provide advisory support to the Kingdom's leadership for the purpose of expanding its economy through a broader exploitation of its proven gas reserves. This culminated in the Kingdom's Natural Gas Initiative in 1999 which invited international oil companies to participate in the development of the Kingdom's non-associated gas reservoirs and the expansion of its power generation, desalination and petrochemical sectors. Following on his retirement from Saudi Aramco in 2004, Dr. Al Husseini co-founded and is president of Husseini Energy Company, a highly specialized oil and gas consulting firm based in Bahrain and Saudi Arabia.

On July 30, 2018, Al Husseini said, "Rather than allowing these hostile maneuvers to go unnoticed in the eyes of the world, the Saudi (energy) minister has placed Iran's subversions of the whole global economy under the spotlight for everyone to see," "The capture of the port of Hodeidah will go a long way towards putting an end to these disruptions".

== Early life ==
Al Husseini was born in Damascus in 1946 to Col. Ibrahim Abdulrahman Al Husseini and Myassar BachImam. His father was a leading Syrian nationalist and member of the Syrian military and political leadership until 1957. Al Husseini attended primary and secondary education at Notre Dame International School in Rome, Italy between 1955 and 1964. He and his family moved to Saudi Arabia in 1961 when King Faisal bin Abdul Aziz invited Col. Ibrahim Al Husseini to advise the Saudi Arabian Council of Ministers on national security matters and to support Prince Abdullah bin Abdul Aziz Al Saud as his special advisor in the establishment of the modern Saudi Arabian National Guard.

== Wikileaks ==
On February 8, 2011 The Guardian newspaper published US cables from Saudi Arabia that were obtained by WikiLeaks. The cables were based on a conversation attributed to Dr Sadad Al Husseini in 2007 claiming Dr Husseini thought members of Aramco management were confusing probable resources with proven reserves and were therefore causing an overstatement of the proven reserves estimates by as much as 300 billion barrels. The difference between probable resources and proven reserves was not clarified in the news reports and the story gained traction in the press outside the Kingdom. Dr Sadad Al Husseini maintained that the US cable gravely misrepresented his opinion and that the report was full of errors and mistakes including quoting resource figures as reserve. Subsequently, Dr Sadad Al Husseini's firm published a press release on February 9, 2011, in response to the significant errors in the cable and clarified Dr Sadad's position on Saudi Arabia's proven reserves and production capabilities.
