= Leonardo Maugeri =

Italian oil and gas expert

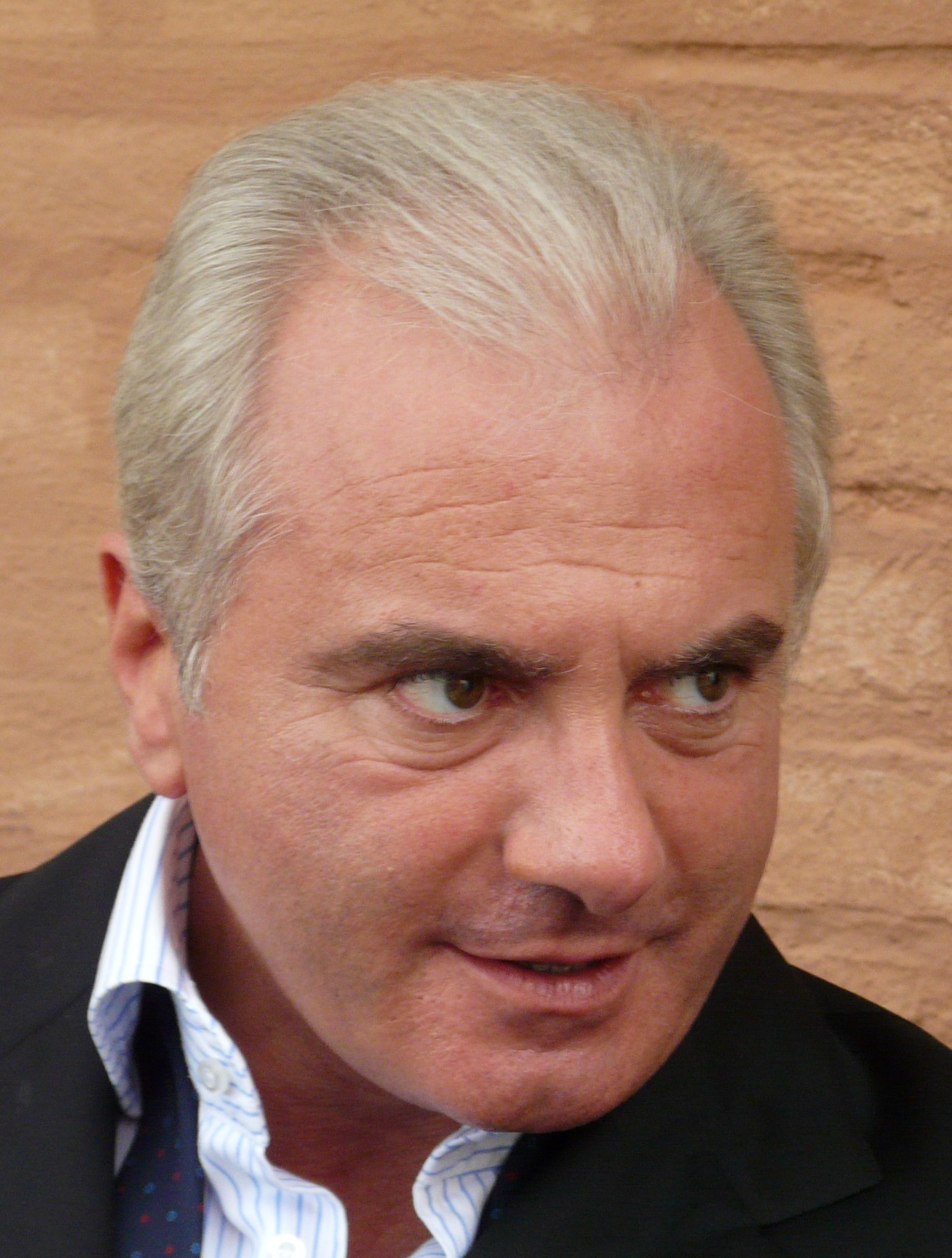
- Born: April 10, 1964; Florence, Italy
- Died: July 10, 2017 (aged 53)
- Occupation: Oil businessman

Leonardo Maugeri (10 April 1964 – 10 July 2017) was an Italian oil and gas expert, who was a top manager at Eni from 1994 to 2011. At the time of his death, he was Chairman & CEO of Investment firm Romulus Asset Management and a Senior Fellow with the Harvard Kennedy School's Belfer Center.

Maugeri sat on the Energy Advisory Board of Accenture. He previously sat on the boards of Saipem, Italgas and Polimeri Europa. Maugeri was a visiting scholar at the Massachusetts Institute of Technology (MIT), as well as a member of the Institute's Energy Advisory Board. He also served as an International Counselor of the Center for Strategic and International Studies (CSIS – Washington, DC).

== Eni ==
Maugeri became Eni’s youngest director in 2000, when at 36 he was named Director of Strategy and Development (2000-2010). In 2010 Maugeri was named Executive Chairman of Polimeri Europa (formerly known as Enimont and currently renamed Versalis), the company managing Eni’s petrochemical activities (2010-2011). The appointment of Maugeri as Eni’s head of strategy coincided with the development of aggressive plans for growth that resulted in the period of greatest development for the company: from 2000 to 2005 Eni increased its hydrocarbons production by 50 per cent while corporate profits reached their highest level in history.

In 2007 Maugeri launched a new strategy for renewable energy. He engineered the relaunch of the historic Istituto Donegani (a research center), with a new focus on renewable energy and a strategic alliance between Eni and MIT - concluded by Maugeri with the then U.S. Secretary of Energy Ernest Moniz. During his chairmanship of Polimeri Europa Maugeri conceived and engineered (in association with Novamont) the largest green chemistry project in the world – the industrial reconversion of the Porto Torres site. Whereas Eni’s petrochemical activities had been operating at a loss for several decades (630 M€ and 513 M€ in 2008 and 2009 respectively), Maugeri’s strategy of radical discontinuity allowed it to obtain a modest but significant positive cash flow from operating activities (25 M€ in 2011, with losses cut to 71 M€).

== Writings ==
Maugeri’s views and predictions have been expressed in a series of articles for several major international newspapers and magazines – including The New York Times, International Herald Tribune (currently International New York Times), Foreign Affairs, Newsweek, Science, Scientific American, The Wall Street Journal, Forbes, and The National Interest. In particular, Maugeri is one of the leading supporters of the view according to which the world does not run the risk of running out of oil (See: “Not in Oil’s Name” – Foreign Affairs, July–August 2003 – and “Oil, Never Cry Wolf: Why the Petroleum Age is Far from Over” – Science, 21–27 May 2004), and for this reason he has been attacked on many occasions by proponents of the “peak oil” thesis .

In his book The Age of Oil: the Mythology, History, and Future of the World’s Most Controversial Resource (Praeger, 2006) Maugeri predicted an imminent collapse of oil prices, which occurred in the second half of 2008. In the same book he predicted the development of unconventional oil and gas resources thanks to the advent of new technologies – including hydraulic fracturing. In Beyond the Age of Oil: The Myths, Realities, and Future of Fossil Fuels and Their Alternatives (Praeger, 2010) Maugeri argues that by 2020 a technological breakthrough will shake the solar industry and permanently alter the energy landscape.

Two essays published by Maugeri during his stay at Harvard have sparked a heated debate at the international level. In these essays, Maugeri argues that the incessant growth of global oil production capacity is generally underestimated, and this – combined with modest growth in oil demand – could lead to an oil price collapse in the course of this decade. The second of these studies – “The Shale Oil Boom: A U.S. Phenomenon” (2013), based on an unprecedented analysis of 4,000 shale oil wells, concludes that the United States could become the world's biggest oil producer by 2017. At the same time, however, the study indicates that the shale oil and gas revolution will not be replicable in the rest of the world – let alone in Europe – due to the high drilling intensity required.

== Bibliography ==
- Maugeri, Leonardo (2006). The Age of Oil: The Mythology, History, and Future of the World's Most Controversial Resource. Westport, CT: Praeger. ISBN 0-275-99008-7. Italian Translation: Maugeri, Leonardo (2006). L'era del petrolio. Mitologia, storia e futuro della più controversa risorsa del mondo. Translated by Maugeri, Alessandro. Milano: Feltrinelli. ISBN 978-8807171284. Book Review.
- Maugeri, Leonardo (2010). Beyond the Age of Oil: The Myths, Realities, and Future of Fossil Fuels and Their Alternatives. Santa Barbara, CA: Praeger. ISBN 9780313381713.

== Essays and articles ==
- Frack to the Future (The National Interest, March/April 2014).
- An Uphill Climb for the Oil Giants (The New York Times - The International Herald Tribune, September 30, 2013).
- Shale Revolution Not So Simple (The National Interest, August 8, 2013).
- The Shale Oil Boom: A U.S. Phenomenon (Harvard, June 2013)
- The Coming Oil Glut (The Wall Street Journal, November 6, 2012)
- Oil: The Next Revolution (Harvard, June 2012)
- Peak Oil ? Not This Century (The Daily Telegraph, November 10, 2009)
- The Crude Truth About Oil Reserves (The Wall Street Journal Europe, November 5, 2009)
- Squeezing More Oil From the Ground (Scientific American, October 2009)
- Understanding oil Price Behaviour Through the Anatomy of a Crisis (The Review of Environmental Economics and Policy, Summer 2009)
- What Lies Beneath ? (Newsweek Intl. Special Edition, December 2006-February 2007)
- That Falling Feeling (Newsweek Intl., October 9, 2006)
- Oil, Oil Everywhere (Forbes, July 24, 2006)
- Two Cheers For Expensive Oil (Foreign Affairs, March–April, 2006 )
- The Saudis May Have Enough Oil (Newsweek Intl., January 23, 2006)
- The Price is Wrong (Newsweek Intl., 6 September 2004)
- The Virgin Oilfields of Iraq (Newsweek Intl., 5 July 2004)
- Oil, Never Cry Wolf: Why the Petroleum Age Is Far from Over (Science, 21–27 May 2004)
- The Coming Gas Bubble (Wall Street Journal, March 8, 2004)
- The Shell Game (Newsweek Intl., 16 February 2004)
- Time to Debunk Mythical Links Between Oil and Politics (Oil & Gas Journal, 15 December 2003)
- The Fallacies of Energy Security (Energy Compass, 19 September 2003)
- Not in Oil's Name (Foreign Affairs, July–August 2003)

== Video interviews ==
- Harvard Belfer Center, Oil: The Next Revolution, 2012. YouTube-Video, (5:15)
- Harvard Belfer Center, The Shale Oil Boom: A U.S. Phenomenon, 2013. YouTube-Video, (7:26)
