= Hirsch report =

2005 US Department of Energy report

The Hirsch report, the commonly referred to name for the report Peaking of World Oil Production: Impacts, Mitigation, and Risk Management, was created by request for the US Department of Energy and published in February 2005. Some information was updated in 2007. It examined the time frame for the occurrence of peak oil, the necessary mitigating actions, and the likely impacts based on the timeliness of those actions.

== Introduction ==
The lead author, Robert L. Hirsch, published a brief summary of this report in October 2005 for the Atlantic Council.

The peaking of world oil production presents the U.S. and the world with an unprecedented risk management problem. As peaking is approached, liquid fuel prices and price volatility will increase dramatically, and, without timely mitigation, the economic, social, and political costs will be unprecedented. Viable mitigation options exist on both the supply and demand sides, but to have substantial impact, they must be initiated more than a decade in advance of peaking.

== Projections ==
A number of industry petroleum geologists, scientists, and economists were listed with their global peak production projection. Later, in 2010, Hirsch developed a projection that global oil production would begin to decline by 2015.

Projected Date	Source
2006–2007	Bakhtiari
2007–2009	Simmons
After 2007	Skrebowski
Before 2009	Deffeyes
Before 2010	Goodstein
Around 2010	Campbell
After 2010	World Energy Council
2010–2020	Laherrere
2016	EIA (Nominal)
After 2020	CERA
2025 or later	Shell

As of 2018, it was unclear whether world crude oil production had peaked. After exhibiting steady growth since the 2009 recession, oil production has been roughly stable between 2015 and 2017, with 75.1 million barrels per day in 2015, 75.4 mbpd in 2016 and 74.7 mbpd in 2017.

== Mitigation ==
Operating under the assumption that existing services must be sustained, the Hirsch report considered the effects of the following mitigation strategies as part of the "crash program":

1. Fuel efficient transportation,
2. Heavy oil/Oil sands,
3. Coal liquefaction,
4. Enhanced oil recovery,
5. Gas-to-liquids.

== Conclusions ==
The report came to the following conclusions:

- World oil peaking is going to happen, and will likely be abrupt.
  - World production of conventional oil will reach a maximum and decline thereafter.
  - Some forecasters project peaking within a decade; others contend it will occur later.
  - Peaking will happen, but the timing is uncertain.
- Oil peaking will adversely affect global economies, particularly the U.S.
  - Over the past century, the U.S. economy has been shaped by the availability of low-cost oil.
  - The economic loss to the United States could be measured on a trillion-dollar scale.
  - Aggressive fuel efficiency and substitute fuel production could provide substantial mitigation.
- Oil peaking presents a unique challenge.
  - Without massive mitigation, the problem will be pervasive and long-term.
  - Previous energy transitions (wood to coal and coal to oil) were gradual and evolutionary.
  - Oil peaking will be abrupt and revolutionary.
- The problem is liquid fuels for transportation.
  - The lifetimes of transportation equipment are measured in decades.
  - Rapid changeover in transportation equipment is inherently impossible.
  - Motor vehicles, aircraft, trains, and ships have no ready alternative to liquid fuels.
- Mitigation efforts will require substantial time.
  - Waiting until production peaks would leave the world with a liquid fuel deficit for 20 years.
  - Initiating a crash program 10 years before peaking leaves a liquid fuels shortfall of a decade.
  - Initiating a crash program 20 years before peaking could avoid a world liquid fuels shortfall.
- Both supply and demand will require attention.
  - Sustained high oil prices will cause forced demand reduction (recession and unemployment).
  - Production of large amounts of substitute liquid fuels can and must be provided.
  - The production of substitute liquid fuels is technically and economically feasible.
- It is a matter of risk management.
  - The peaking of world oil production is a classic risk management problem.
  - Mitigation efforts earlier than required may be premature, if peaking is long delayed.
  - On the other hand, if peaking is soon, failure to initiate mitigation could be extremely damaging.
- Government intervention will be required.
  - The economic and social implications of oil peaking would otherwise be chaotic.
  - Expediency may require major changes to existing administrative and regulatory procedures.
- Economic upheaval is not inevitable.
  - Without mitigation, the peaking of world oil production will cause major economic upheaval.
  - Given enough lead time, the problems are soluble with existing technologies.
  - New technologies will help, but on a longer time scale.
- More information is needed.
  - Effective action to combat peaking requires a better understanding of the issues.
  - Risks and possible benefits of possible mitigation actions need to be examined.

== Three scenarios ==
- Waiting until world oil production peaks before taking crash program action leaves the world with a significant liquid fuel deficit for more than two decades.
- Initiating a mitigation crash program 10 years before world oil peaking helps considerably but still leaves a liquid fuels shortfall roughly a decade after the time that oil would have peaked.
- Initiating a mitigation crash program 20 years before peaking appears to offer the possibility of avoiding a world liquid fuels shortfall for the forecast period.

== Applicability beyond the US, critical remarks ==
The Hirsch Report urged a crash program of new technologies and changes in manners and attitudes in the US as well as implying more research and development. The report cites a peaking crude oil supply as the main reason for immediate action.

During the significant oil price rise through 2007, a theme among several industry observers was that the price rise was only partially due to a limit in crude oil availability (peak oil). For example, an article by Jad Mouawad cited an unusual number of fires and other outages among U.S. refineries in the summer of 2007 which disrupted supply. However, a lack of refining capacity would only seem to explain high gasoline prices, not high crude oil prices. Indeed, if the refineries were unable to process available crude oil then there should be a crude oil glut that would reduce crude prices on international crude oil markets. Then again, sharp changes in crude oil prices can also be due to stock market volatility and fear over the security of future supplies, or, on the other hand, anticipation by investors of a rise in the value of crude oil once refining capacity picks up again.

As for the global usefulness of the Hirsch conclusions, as of 2004, the US share of global oil consumption was about 26%, while its share of the world population was only 4.3%; Europe used 11% of global oil while having about 6.8% of the world population. An average car in Germany uses about 8.1 liters per 100 km; the US consumption is 16.2 L. In US terms, 1 gallon delivers 44 miles in Germany but only 22 in the United States.

So far a part of the changes ultimately requested by Hirsch for the US have been already implemented in Europe (and cum grano salis in Asia). The difference had been much smaller at the start of the 70s. Europe adopted more after the various oil shocks and enhanced the changes by introducing much higher taxes on gasoline. The differences now are not only a lack of energy-saving technologies, in car building and usage, and passive insulation of buildings in the US. The traditional significant differences in the setup and density of settlements, share of suburbs, use of public transport, and consumer behavior have been widening. Taking this into account, a peak oil shock as outlined by Hirsch will have a much more severe outcome in the US compared to other parts of the world, especially Europe.

== See also ==
- Energy conservation
- Energy crisis
- Marion King Hubbert, and the Hubbert curve
- Peak oil
- Malthusianism
