= Chris Skrebowski =

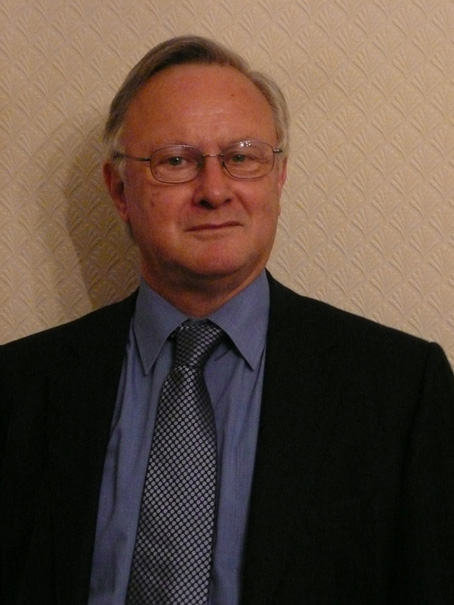
- Born: 1946 (age 79–80)
- Occupations: Journalist, Editor, Author

Chris Skrebowski is a well-known commentator on the oil industry and an expert on global oil supply. He is the founding Director of Peak Oil Consulting and consulting editor for Petroleum Review, the magazine of the UK Energy Institute. Skrebowski is also a founding member of the Association for the Study of Peak Oil and Gas (ASPO) and sits on the board of the Oil Depletion Analysis Centre (ODAC). He is a Fellow of the Energy Institute and advises the All Party Parliamentary Group on Peak Oil and Gas (APPGOPO).

Initially sceptical about peak oil predictions, he was persuaded by Colin Campbell of the unreliability of oil reserves data and the risks this posed to energy supply projections. His insight was to recognise that future production flows, rather than oil reserves, were the key determinant of global oil supply. Consequently, he developed Peak Flow Analysis based on the future oil flows identified in his own Global Oil Megaprojects Database. Using this methodology he concluded that major supply/demand imbalances would occur by 2007 with actual peak oil flows occurring no later than 2011.

Skrebowski has 38 years experience in the oil industry, starting work in 1970 as a long-term planner for BP. His career has been divided between industry planning/market analysis and oil journalism. He was Senior Analyst for the Saudi Oil Ministry in London (1985–1994), editor of Petroleum Economist (1994–97) and editor of Petroleum Review (1997–2008). He comments regularly on oil and gas related subjects in the international media.

== See also ==
- Ali Morteza Samsam Bakhtiari
- Kenneth S. Deffeyes
- Richard Heinberg
- Jean Laherrère
- Jeremy Leggett
- Matthew Simmons
