= Escape from Suburbia =

Escape from Suburbia (Full title: Escape from Suburbia: Beyond the American Dream)
- Directed by: Gregory Greene
- Written by: Gregory Greene
- Produced by: Dara Rowland
- Cinematography: Gregory Greene; Barry Silverthorn
- Edited by: Dexter Ico
- Music by: Tommy Gerencsen; Johnny Nixon
- Distributed by: Self
- Release date: June 2007
- Running time: 95 minutes
- Country: Canada
- Language: English

Escape from Suburbia: Beyond the American Dream is a 2007 Canadian documentary film written and directed by Gregory Greene, as a sequel to Greene's film The End of Suburbia, and set to address what is termed "the upcoming energy crisis". Through interviews with individuals, Gregory Greene outlines potential solutions to the coming energy crisis.

== Cast ==
Among the interviewees are former Governor General of Canada Ed Schreyer, author Matthew Simmons, author Richard Heinberg, author Michael Ruppert, author Jeremy Rifkin, author Thomas Homer-Dixon, U.S. Representative from Maryland Roscoe Bartlett, former CIA director James Woolsey, author and speaker James Howard Kunstler, and political activist and journalist Kate Holloway.

== Background ==
The film resulted from director Gregory Greene having attended a Paris conference on peak oil in 2003. Returning to Canada, he devised a trilogy of non fiction films addressing the issues global peaking of oil supplies adversely affecting modern civilization. The first of his trilogy, The End of Suburbia: Oil Depletion and the Collapse of the American Dream, deals with the problem of rising world costs in the face of dwindling supplies.

The second in the trilogy, Escape From Suburbia: Beyond the American Dream, outlines how the issue will affect modern life styles and speaks toward solutions. The film first aired on Sundance Channel in 2007, and re-aired as part of their The Green television series.
