= Ali Morteza Samsam Bakhtiari =

Ali M. Samsam Bakhtiari
- علی مرتضی صمصام بختیاری
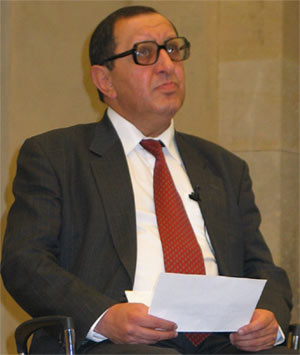
- Born: 1945; Masjed Soleyman, Iran
- Died: 30 October 2007 (age 61-62); Tehran, Iran
- Occupation(s): Engineer, Educator, Author

Ali Morteza Samsam Bakhtiari (1945 – 30 October 2007) was an Iranian author and oil expert employed by the National Iranian Oil Company (NIOC). He held a number of senior positions with this organization beginning in 1971. He was also an adviser to the Oil Depletion Analysis Centre.

== Biography ==
Bakhtiari was a member of the Bakhtiari tribe.

He held a Ph.D. in chemical engineering from the Swiss Federal Institute of Technology in Zurich, Switzerland. He had been a part-time lecturer for the Technical Faculty at Tehran University for many years. Bakhtiari wrote a number of short essays and is the author of Peaks and Troughs which is about the modern history of Iran.

Bakhtiari suggested that it would require an act of god for the world to avoid warring over depleting energy resources. He also believed that a peak in natural gas would be more shocking than peak oil because natural gas is less fluid and requires pipelines and LNG facilities to export overseas.

Bakhtiari was featured in the 2004 documentary The End of Suburbia.

Bakhtiari suddenly died of a heart attack in 2007. His funeral and burial were in Tehran. He was survived by his children, Amir Bahman and Golbenaz Samsam Bakhtiari.

== Quotes ==
- "The big risk in Saudi Arabia is that Ghawar's rate of decline increases to an alarming point. That will set bells ringing all over the oil world because Ghawar underpins Saudi output and Saudi undergirds worldwide production."
- "As for Iran, the usually accepted official 132 billion barrels (2.10×10^{10} m^{3}) is almost 100 billion barrels (1.6×10^{10} m^{3}) over any realistic assay."

== Bibliography ==
- Bakhtiari, Ali Morteza Samsam (1996). Peaks and Troughs: A tentative interpretation of Iran's modern history. Minerva Press. ISBN 1-85863-402-4.
- Bakhtiari, Ali Morteza Samsam (2006). The Last of the Khans: The Life of Morteza Quli Khan Samsam Bakhtiari. iUniverse. ISBN 0-595-38248-7.

== See also ==
- Colin Campbell
- Kenneth S. Deffeyes
- Richard Heinberg
- Chris Skrebowski
- Matthew Simmons
