= Twilight in the Desert =

2005 book by Matthew Simmons

Twilight in the Desert: The Coming Saudi Oil Shock and the World Economy
- Hardcover edition
- Author: Matthew Simmons
- Language: English
- Subject: Petroleum industry in Saudi Arabia, peak oil
- Genre: Non-fiction
- Publisher: John Wiley & Sons
- Publication date: June 10, 2005
- Publication place: United States
- Media type: Print, e-book
- Pages: 448 pp.
- ISBN: 978-0471738763

Twilight in the Desert: The Coming Saudi Oil Shock and the World Economy is a book by American investment banker Matthew Simmons. The text was initially published on June 10, 2005 by John Wiley & Sons. The book focuses on the petroleum industry of Saudi Arabia and posits that this country is approaching—or already at—its peak oil output and cannot substantially increase its oil production.

== Overview ==
In 2005, Matt Simmons wrote a book called Twilight in the Desert. In it, he summarized what he learned about Saudi Arabian oil production by reading 200 academic papers. He concluded from his analysis that the oil extraction techniques being used there were techniques that one might use if the fields were quite depleted. Because of this, he doubted that we should believe stories that Saudi oil production can be greatly expanded. Instead, he raised the possibility that in the not too distant future, Saudi oil production will suddenly decline. Matt's research underlying the book was no doubt behind his concern that oil reserves and oil production rates are not audited.

—Review on theoildrum.com

== Simmons–Tierny bet ==
Simmons' prediction of rising oil prices made in Twilight in the Desert led to a bet with New York Times columnist John Tierney in August 2005. The two men bet US$10,000 on whether the daily price-per-barrel of crude oil averaged over the 2010 calendar year would exceed $200 when adjusted for inflation, with Simmons to win the bet if it did, or Tierney if it did not. The average price for a barrel of oil in 2010 turned out to be $80 ($71 in 2005 dollars, only slightly higher than the $65 barrel price when the bet was made). Simmons died on August 8, 2010, and the bet was paid out by his colleagues in Tierney's favor.

== See also ==
Similarly themed books include:

- Beyond Oil by Kenneth Deffeyes
- Hot, Flat, and Crowded by Thomas L. Friedman
- Oil 101 by Morgan Downey
