= Ellen-Adele Harper =

American writer and activist (born 1958)

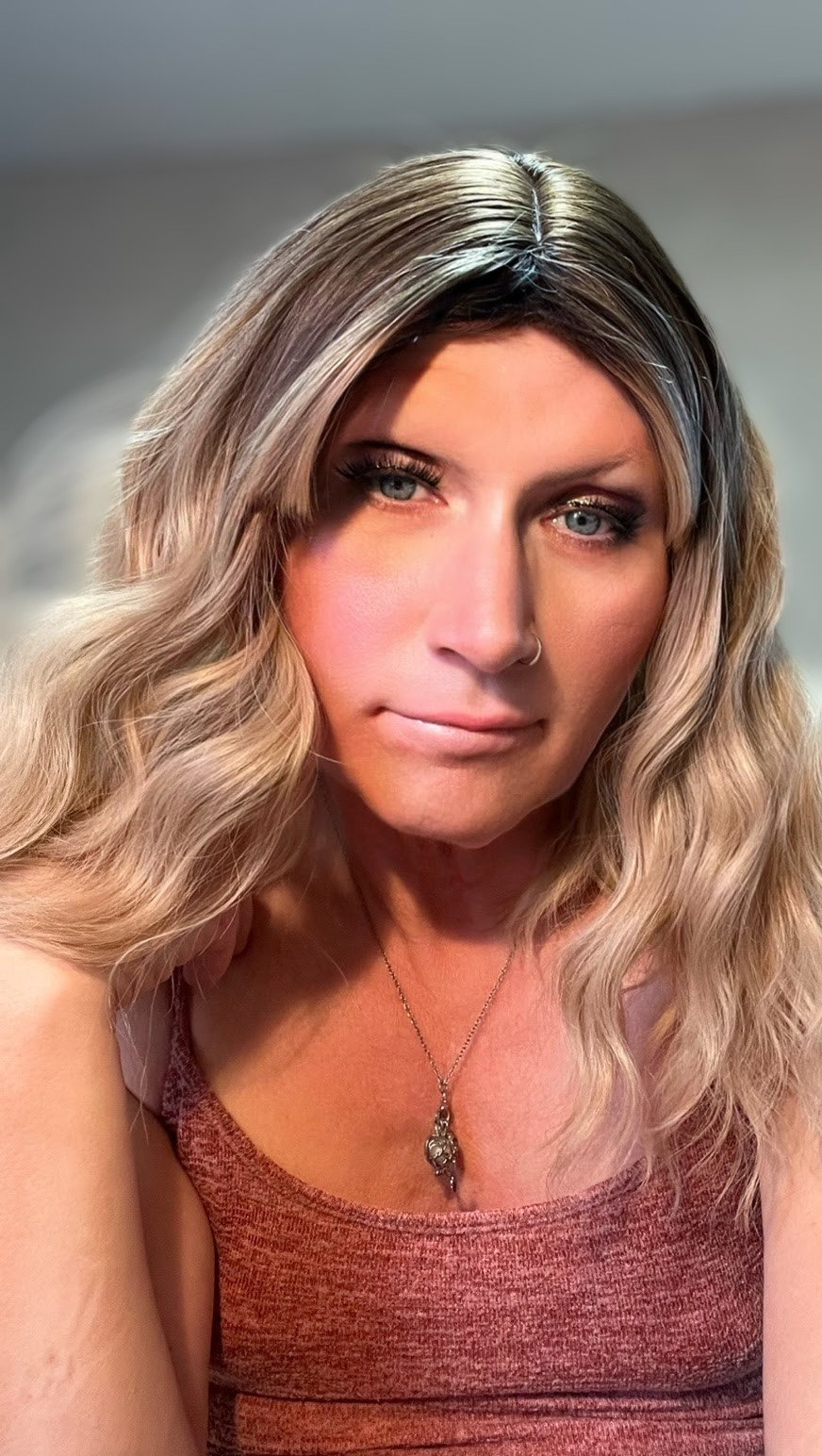
Ellen-Adele Harper, January 2024

Ellen-Adele Harper (born Dale Allen Pfeiffer, March 30, 1958) is a geologist and writer from Michigan, United States. She has investigated and wrote about energy depletion and potential future resource wars. She also wrote about class war, sustainability, direct action and the environment. She is also an anarchist activist and a member of the Industrial Workers of the World. In 1999, She was one of the organizers of a hunger strike to provide medical care for the incarcerated Leonard Peltier.

== Career ==
=== 2000s ===
In 2001 She began writing articles regarding energy at From The Wilderness. In 2003 she wrote their often cited article on peak oil and food production titled Eating Fossil Fuels. In 2005 she ended her association with the website and its founder, Michael C. Ruppert. In 2006, she expanded the Eating Fossil Fuels article into a book.

In 2007, she retired from writing nonfiction. Since that time, she has been busy writing fiction under a pen name (PD Allen).

=== 2020s ===
In 2022, she came out as transgender. In 2023, she had her name and gender legally changed to Ellen-Adele Harper, female. In 2024, she had her genes karotyped and discovered that she is intersex, having XXY genes, a condition known as Klinefelter syndrome. Ms. Harper is now a published author, noted poet, a transgender and intersex activist, a model, and a performance artist.

== Views ==
=== Energy ===
Ms. Harper believed that energy depletion will have a major impact upon the socioeconomic system that will not be resolved by turning to renewable energy alone. Through mathematical modeling, she predicted that energy consumption has grown to the point that we will never sustain our current consumption levels without plentiful and cheap fossil fuels.

=== Society ===
She argued that we must cut our consumption, abandoning the current socioeconomic system in favor of re-localization, sustainability and decentralization. She believed it is possible for human society to achieve equitable, sustainable stability while maintaining a reasonable quality of life. To reach this goal, she recommended direct action on a grassroots level, as opposed to a reliance upon government and business.

== Published books ==
As Dale Allen Pfeiffer

- The End of the Oil Age (2004)
- Eating Fossil Fuels: Oil, Food and the Coming Crisis in Agriculture (2006), New Society Publishers

As PD Allen

- Complete Tales of da Yoopernatural (2011)
- Fiddlesticks (2012)
- Murderer's Sky; Book One of Under Shattered Skies (2012)
- Daemon Sky; Book Two of Under Shattered Skies (2012)
- Mourning Sky; Book Three of Under Shattered Skies (2013)
- Earth Seeds (2013)
- Song of Existence (2013)
- The Complete Quantum Meditations (2014)

As Ellen-Adele Harper

- Fever Dreams; transgender and shamanic poetry (2022), Transient Press
- The Bhagavad Gita; a new translation (2022), Transient Press
- Prison Psalms; poems from beyond these walls (2022), Transient Press
- Transformer; more than meets the eye (2023), Transient Press
- Sanatana Dharma; a survey of Hinduism (2024), Transient Press

== See also ==
- Colin J. Campbell
- Kenneth S. Deffeyes
- Richard Heinberg
- Matthew R. Simmons
- Michael Ruppert
