= Connexions Information Sharing Services =

Canadian social change library (1975-)

Connexions (full name Connexions Information Sharing Services) is the central online library and archive for Canada's movements for social change. The non-profit project also maintains a comprehensive directory of Canadian associations and NGOs.

== History and background ==
The project was founded in 1975 as a national information clearinghouse for grassroots activists involved with urban and rural poverty issues. The project was originally called the Canadian Information Sharing Service. In an initial consultation, Jim Morin, who worked with the Canadian News Synthesis publication, proposed a voluntary collective organization for the project and became the first coordinating editor, who focused upon publishing analytical abstracts of the diagnosis and strategies being developed by grassroots activists, in order to circulate their work on a national level to promote networking, learning and collaboration. The name was changed to Connexions in 1978 to more clearly identify the project's action-oriented goal of connecting grassroots activists with each other and with information, ideas, and issues. The scope of the project expanded to include Native rights, third world development, women's empowerment, peace, human rights, and other issues. The project disseminated information through the newsletter-format Connexions Digest, which received documents and materials from participants across the country, and distilled them into a subject-indexed summary format.

Print-based for the first two decades of its existence, Connexions published more than 4,000 abstracts summarising the content of documents, articles, reports, and books, as well as profiles of organizations and projects, becoming in the process a resource and networking tool for Canadian activists and researchers concerned with social justice issues.

In the 1980s and 1990s it published The Connexions Annual, a widely distributed sourcebook of social and environmental alternatives. The Connexions Annual's combined articles surveying current issues confronting movements for social change with lists of resources and directory listings and profiles of grassroots groups working for change. The last print edition of The Connexions Annual appeared in 1994.

Connexions
- Former name: Canadian Information Sharing Service
- Website type: Online library and archive; Directory of Canadian associations and NGOs
- Headquarters: Toronto, Canada

In the mid-1990s, Connexions moved online, and added new resources to its online library while pursuing an ongoing program of digitizing its print-based resources. Connexions Online hosts an online library of more than 7,000 documents related to human rights, civil liberties, social justice, economic alternatives, democratization, women's issues, gay, lesbian, and bisexual rights, First Nations and Native Peoples issues, alternative lifestyles, and environmental issues.

In addition to using Library of Congress and Dewey Decimal subject classifications, Connexions also uses a controlled vocabulary database of more than 20,000 subject headings developed by Connexions in association with Sources, the Canadian directory of experts and spokespersons. Connexions has worked with Sources since 1993, when Sources publisher Barrie Zwicker, a media critic and peace activist, asked Connexions Co-ordinator Ulli Diemer to lead a joint project to develop an online directory of Canadian associations.

== Resources ==
The Connexions Directory of Associations, a separate resource also available on the Connexions site, now lists more than 5,000 organizations, indexed under more than 20,000 topics. Connexions also maintains the Connexions Calendar which lists Canadian events related to social change. Connexions produces an extensive compilation of materials on Israel and Palestine, featuring resources for "those who believe that a solution to the conflict is possible only on the basis of justice, equality, respect for human rights, mutual recognition and an end to Israel's occupation of the Palestinian territories."

Connexions maintains other specialised collections, including a selection of political manifestos from 1776 to the present. Connexions hosts the complete archive of The Red Menace, a libertarian socialist newsletter published from 1976 to 1980 by the Libertarian Socialist Collective, as well as a partial archive of Seven News, a community newspaper founded by community activists associated with John Sewell, the Toronto alderman who later to become reform mayor of Toronto.

== Political orientation ==
Connexions describes its political orientation as left-pluralism, that is, including a diversity of views on the progressive side of the political spectrum. The writers' guidelines observe that "our biases are reflected in which works we select for inclusion in Connexions, but within our selection guidelines, we endeavour to include materials taking different points of view and proposing a variety of goals and strategies. We try to provide our readers with neutral summaries of the works we abstract, leaving it to the readers to make their own judgments." Connexions does identify the broad principles that guide its decisions about which kinds of materials to select for inclusion in the Connexions Library. As a rule, documents written from a Leninist, Trotskyist, or post-modernist perspective are not included. Connexions' principles include a strong commitment to civil liberties, human rights, freedom of speech, freedom of the press, secularism, and democratic principles. Connexions declares itself opposed to censorship and to all forms of discrimination and oppression based on gender, sexual orientation, ethnicity, or race.

== Theology of Connexions ==
Connexions is a secular project unaffiliated with any religion, but church-based social activists played an important role in founding and developing the project, and funding through its early years came from church bodies in Canada and abroad, including the United Church of Canada, the Anglican Church of Canada, the Presbyterian Church of Canada, various Roman Catholic dioceses and religious orders, and the World Council of Churches. The work of Connexions inspired a number of individuals affiliated with the Canadian Theological Reflection Project to publish a theological reflection on the meaning of Connexions under the title A Theology of Connexions which was circulated among church bodies internationally. It observed that "Connexions has become something of a crossroads, a meeting place–a place where stories get told. On the page of Connexions, one hears the voices of the powerless and the abused, the disabled, prisoners, the unemployed, the underemployed, skid row residents, the poor, the psychiatric patients, Third World peoples, immigrants, workers, older persons, women, native peoples, etc. Connexions realizes that the stories of the poor and oppressed differ radically from those of the typical Canadian as portrayed in mainstream culture."

== International internship program ==
Connexions runs a social justice internship program that receives interns and volunteers from many different countries. Interns work on developing the electronic archive, scanning documents and images, writing descriptions, and marketing. Connexions is in the process of translating its controlled-vocabulary search terms into French, Spanish, and German, and is looking for more volunteers to help with this.
