= Rimini protocol (disambiguation) =

Rimini Protocol most commonly refers to:

- Rimini protocol, a proposal to stabilize oil prices
- Rimini Protokoll, a Berlin-based avantgarde theatre group
