= Demand destruction =

Permanent downward shift on the demand curve of a commodity

Demand destruction is a permanent downward shift on the demand curve in the direction of lower demand of a commodity, such as energy products, induced by a prolonged period of high prices or constrained supply. In the context of the oil industry, "demand" generally refers to the quantity consumed (see for example the output of any major industry organization such as the International Energy Agency), rather than any measure of a demand curve as used in mainstream economics.

In economics, demand destruction refers to a permanent or sustained decline in the demand for a certain good in response to persistent high prices or limited supply. Because of persistent high prices, consumers may decide that it is not worth purchasing as much of that good, or seek out alternatives as substitutes.

== Usage ==
The term came to some prominence in tandem with the peak oil theory, where demand destruction is the reduction of demand for oil and oil-derived products. The term is used by Matthew Simmons, Mike Ruppert and other prominent proponents of the theory. It is also used in other resource industries, such as mining.

== Examples ==
A familiar illustration of demand destruction is the effect of high gasoline prices on automobile sales. It has been widely observed that when gasoline prices are high enough, consumers tend to begin buying smaller and more efficient cars, gradually reducing per-capita demand for gasoline. If the price rise were caused by a temporary lack of supply, and the price then subsequently goes back down as supply returns to normal, the quantity of gas consumed in this case does not immediately go back to its previous level, since the smaller cars that had been sold remain in the fleet for some time. Demand thereby has been "destroyed", shifting the demand curve.

The expectation of future prices and their long-term maintenance at non-economic levels for a certain quantity of consumption also affects vehicle decisions. If the price of fuel is so high that marginal consumers cannot afford the same mileage without switching to a more efficient car, then they are forced to sell the less efficient one. An increase of the quantity of such vehicles causes the used market value to fall, which then increases the depreciation expected of a new vehicle, which increases the total cost of ownership of such vehicles, making them less popular.

The coal reserves in some regions are regarded as a stranded asset that may be permanently left in the ground. Competition from low priced natural gas, reduced demand for coal due to emission restrictions and uneconomic export situations each play a part. Environmental legislation that prevents fracking strands potential natural gas reserves.

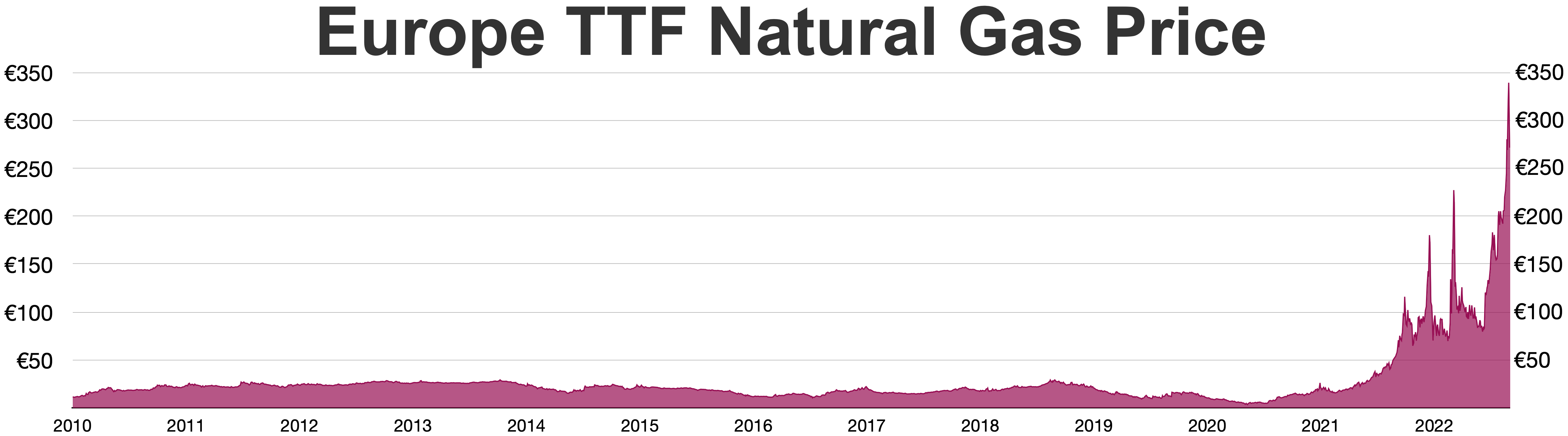

During the 1000% price increase of natural gas in Europe in 2021-2022, up to 70% of Europe's nitrogen fertilizer production was shut down on various occasions, as gas is the main part of the production cost.

== See also ==
- 1970s energy crisis
- Oil price increases since 2003
- Population growth
- Stagflation
- Supply and demand
