= Edward L. Morse =

American economist (born 1942)

- Born: January 5, 1942 (age 84); New York City, NY, United States

Academic background
- Education: Johns Hopkins University (B.A., 1963); Johns Hopkins University (M.A., 1966); Princeton University (Ph.D., 1969)

Edward Lewis Morse (born January 5, 1942, in New York City) is an American energy economist. He is currently the Global Head of Commodities Research at Citigroup in New York. From 1969 to 1975, he taught at the Woodrow Wilson School at Princeton University. From 1979 to 1981, Morse served as Deputy Assistant Secretary of State for International Energy Policy. From 2006 to 2008, he was chief energy economist at Lehman Brothers, where he argued the oil price rises of 2007 and 2008 were an unsustainable bubble. He is the author of numerous books and scholarly articles on international relations and energy topics. He was a co-founder of PFC Energy, a Washington-based energy consultancy group.

== Early life ==
Morse was born in New York City and graduated from Johns Hopkins University (B.A., 1963; M.A., 1966). He then received his Ph.D. in Politics from Princeton University in 1969.

== Career ==
He taught international relations at Princeton University's Woodrow Wilson School of Public and International Affairs from 1969 to 1975. From 1975 to 1978, Morse was a senior research fellow at the Council on Foreign Relations.

In 1978, Morse joined the U.S. Department of State, where he was initially executive assistant to the Undersecretary for Economic Affairs. In 1979, Morse became Deputy Assistant Secretary of State for International Energy Policy, and was the U.S. representative at the International Energy Agency, under the Carter and Reagan administrations.

From 1981 to 1984, he worked at Phillips Petroleum Co., where he was Director for International Affairs. He was a co-founder and Managing Director at PFC Energy from 1984 to 1996. He was president of the Petroleum Intelligence Weekly, a premier journal for energy intelligence, from 1988 to 1999. In 1999, Morse joined Hess Energy Trading Co. as a senior executive.

In 2001, Morse chaired a task force on energy security, sponsored jointly by the Council on Foreign Relations and the James A. Baker III Institute at Rice University.

In 2006, Morse joined Lehman Brothers as a managing director and chief energy economist. Upon its bankruptcy in 2008, Morse moved to Louis Capital Markets. In January 2010, Edward Morse joined Credit Suisse as Head of Commodities Research. In 2011, Morse was hired by Citigroup to be their Global Head of Commodities Research.

He is chairman of the New York Energy Forum, and serves on the academic advisory boards at Columbia University's School of International and Public Affairs and Johns Hopkins University's School of Advanced International Studies. He is a member of Oxford Energy Policy Club, the Council on Foreign Relations, and an editor of The Geopolitics of Energy. For his pioneering contributions to energy research, he was honored by the International Association for Energy Economics.

== Personal life ==
Morse has a keen interest in ballet, and is a member of the Chairman's Council of the American Ballet Theatre.

He married Linda Kasle Jones on August 15, 1965. He has two children, Michael Ari and Molly Rachel, and five grandchildren.

== Oil price spike of 2007-08 ==
In 2008, as oil prices approached its peak near $150/bbl, Morse and his research team at Lehman Brothers argued this was an unsustainable overshooting fueled by behavioral herding, and that there would be sufficient demand destruction in advanced economies and new supply from non-OPEC countries to cause prices to collapse . As oil prices subsequently plunged, Morse's foresight proved correct .

== 1MDB controversy ==
In 2009 Morse provided a valuation for the Malaysian state fund 1MDB for petroleum exploration and production assets associated with PetroSaudi International Ltd. The valuation he provided was $2.9 billion, which supported 1MDB's decision to enter a joint venture with PetroSaudi. The same assets were valued earlier that year by PetroSaudi at $0.5 billion. Leaked emails and 1MDB board minutes suggest that Morse's valuation was influenced by PetroSaudi director Patrick Mahony.

== Books and articles by Edward Morse ==
- Foreign Policy and Interdependence in Gaullist France. 1973.
- Modernization and the Transformation of International Relations. 1976.
- The Battle for Energy Dominance. Foreign Affairs. March/April 2002.
