= The End of Suburbia =

- Directed by: Gregory Greene
- Written by: Gregory Greene
- Produced by: Barry Silverthorn
- Cinematography: Barry Silverthorn
- Edited by: Barry Silverthorn
- Music by: Ken Vandevrie
- Production company: The Electric Wallpaper Co.
- Distributed by: The Electric Wallpaper Co.
- Release date: 5 May 2004
- Running time: 78 minutes
- Country: Canada
- Language: English

The End of Suburbia: Oil Depletion and the Collapse of The American Dream is a 2004 documentary film concerning peak oil and its implications for the suburban lifestyle, written and directed by Toronto-based filmmaker Gregory Greene.

== Description ==
The film is hosted by Canadian broadcaster Barrie Zwicker and features discussions with James Howard Kunstler, Peter Calthorpe, Michael Klare, Richard Heinberg, Matthew Simmons, Michael Ruppert, Julian Darley, Colin Campbell, Kenneth S. Deffeyes, Ali Samsam Bakhtiari and Steve Andrews.

In 2007, Greene released a sequel called Escape from Suburbia.

== Cast ==
- Matthew Simmons, as himself
- Richard Heinberg, as himself
- Michael Ruppert, as himself
- James Howard Kunstler, as himself
- Steve Andrews, as himself
- Ali Samsam Bakhtiari, as himself
- Peter Calthorpe, as himself
- Colin Campbell, as speaker
- Dick Cheney, as himself (archive footage)
- Julian Darley, as himself
- Kenneth S. Deffeyes, as himself
- Michael Klare, as himself
- Barrie Zwicker, as host

== See also ==
- Association for the Study of Peak Oil and Gas (ASPO)
- The Long Emergency
