= Fadhil Chalabi =

Iraqi economist (1929–2019)

Fadhil Jafar al-Chalabi (1929–2019) was an Iraqi economist, and was Acting Secretary General of OPEC from 1983 to 1988. He was a second cousin of the politician Ahmed Chalabi.

== Biography ==
Born in 1929 in Baghdad to Jafar Mohamad al-Chalabi and Fatima née al -Uzri, Chalabi studied law at Baghdad University and graduated in 1951 before gaining a PhD in economics from the University of Paris. In 1968 he was appointed director of oil affairs in the Iraqi Ministry of Oil, and in 1973 became Iraq's permanent undersecretary of oil. In 1975 he was one of the hostages taken by Carlos the Jackal at the OPEC-Conference in Vienna ( see OPEC siege). He was assistant secretary general to the Organization of Arab Petroleum Exporting Countries in Kuwait from 1976 to 1978. From 1978 to 1988 he was deputy secretary general of OPEC, serving as acting secretary general from 1983 to 1988.

In 1987 he became Executive Director of the Centre for Global Energy Studies, a London-based think-tank founded and chaired by Ahmed Zaki Yamani. He retired in 2011.

Chalabi was interviewed in the 2006 documentary A Crude Awakening: The Oil Crash. He received the British Institute of Energy Economics Award for Distinction in 1988.

== Personal life ==
He was married in 1956 to Abla Bahjat Salih and has four children.

== Works ==
- OPEC and the international oil industry: a changing structure, 1980
- The world oil price collapse of 1986: causes and implications for the future of OPEC, 1986
- 'OPEC and the Present Structural Limitations on its Oil Price Control', OPEC Review (Paris), Summer 1988
- OPEC at the crossroads, 1989
- The Gulf War and the emerging oil situation in the world, 1991
- Oil policies, oil myths: analysis and memoir of an OPEC insider, 2010
