= Collapse (film) =

- Theatrical poster
- Directed by: Chris Smith
- Produced by: Chris Smith; Kate Noble
- Starring: Michael Ruppert
- Cinematography: Ed Lachman; Max Malkin; Chris Smith
- Edited by: Barry Poltermann
- Music by: Didier Leplae; Joe Wong
- Distributed by: Vitagraph Films
- Release date: September 12, 2009 (TIFF)
- Running time: 82 minutes
- Country: United States
- Language: English

Collapse, directed by Chris Smith, is an American documentary film exploring the theories, writings and life story of the controversial author Michael Ruppert (1951–2014). Collapse premiered at the Toronto International Film Festival in September 2009 and gained positive reviews from its viewers.

== Overview ==
Ruppert, a former Los Angeles police officer who describes himself as an investigative reporter and radical thinker, has written books on the events of the September 11 attacks and on energy issues. Critics in the mainstream media and D.C. described him as a conspiracy theorist and an alarmist.

Director Smith interviewed Ruppert over the course of fourteen hours in an interrogation-like setting in an abandoned warehouse basement meat locker near downtown Los Angeles. Ruppert's interview was shot over five days throughout March and April 2009. The filmmakers distilled these interviews down to an 82-minute monologue with archival footage interspersed as illustration.

The title refers to Ruppert's belief that unsustainable energy and financial policies have led to an ongoing collapse of modern industrial civilization.

Critics have variously described the film as both supportive and critical of Ruppert's views. Smith himself, speaking at the Toronto International Film Festival premiere, said that "What I hoped to reveal was ... that his obsession with the collapse of industrial civilization has led to the collapse of his life. In the end, it is a character study about his obsession."

== Synopsis ==
Sitting in a room that looks like a bunker, Ruppert briefly recounts his life including his parents' ties to U.S. intelligence agencies and Ruppert's own career as an LAPD beat cop and detective. Ruppert then summarizes current energy and economic issues, focusing mainly around the core concepts of peak oil and sustainable development. He also criticizes fiat money, fractional reserve banking, compound interest, and leveraging, and discusses alleged CIA drug trafficking.

The bulk of the film presents Ruppert making an array of predictions including social unrest, violence, population dislocation and governmental collapses in the United States and the world. His commentary uses news reports and data available via the Internet as references, but he applies a unique interpretation which he calls “connecting the dots”.

Smith periodically stops Ruppert to question his assumptions and provide a note of skepticism.

== Critical reception ==
After its premiere at the Toronto Film Festival, Owen Gleiberman of Entertainment Weekly called Collapse “one of the few true buzz films of the festival” and wrote that “you may want to dispute [Ruppert], but more than that you’ll want to hear him, because what he says — right or wrong, prophecy or paranoia — takes up residence in your mind.”

Daily Variety wrote that Collapse was “unnervingly persuasive much of the time, and merely riveting when it's not. Ruppert's talking-head analysis gets the Errol Morris treatment from director Chris Smith (American Movie), whose intellectual horror film ranks as another essential work.”

The Onion's A.V. Club wrote that "in several immensely poignant moments, we can also see an angry, lonely, vulnerable man whose life epitomizes the title as much as the globe does. There are many layers to the man and the movie, and I for one left the theater shaken."

Roger Ebert wrote, "I don't know when I've seen a thriller more frightening. I couldn't tear my eyes from the screen. "Collapse" is even entertaining, in a macabre sense. I think you owe it to yourself to see it."

== Distribution ==
In October 2009 the filmmakers announced that Collapse would premiere simultaneously in theaters in New York City and via video on demand on November 6, 2009. According to press announcements, this unique release arrangement “will mark the first time a film will be released this soon after it premiered at a festival without distribution.”

== See also ==
- Collapse (film, 2010)
