= A Crude Awakening: The Oil Crash =

A Crude Awakening
- Theatrical Poster
- Directed by: Basil Gelpke; Ray McCormack
- Produced by: Basil Gelpke; Ray McCormack
- Edited by: Georgia Wyss
- Music by: Philip Glass; Daniel Schnyder
- Distributed by: Lava Productions AG
- Release date: 24 May 2006
- Running time: 94 minutes
- Country: Switzerland
- Language: English

A Crude Awakening: The Oil Crash is a 2006 documentary film about peak oil, produced and directed by Basil Gelpke and Ray McCormack.

== Overview ==
A Crude Awakening: The Oil Crash explores key historical events, data and predictions regarding the theory of global peak in petroleum production through interviews with petroleum geologists, former OPEC officials, energy analysts, politicians, and political analysts. The film contains contemporary footage interspersed with news and commercial footage from the growth heyday of petroleum production. The documentary focuses on information and testimony that supported the projection of a near-term oil production "peak" - a theory since debunked by the revolution in fracking and record-breaking production in the United States, once said to have already peaked in the 1970s.

The documentary examines our dependence on oil, showing how oil is essential for almost every aspect of our modern lifestyle, from driving to work to clothing to medicine and clean tap water. A Crude Awakening asks the tough question, “What happens when we run out of cheap oil?” Through expert interviews and archival footage, the film spells out in startling detail the challenges we would face in dealing with the possibility of a world without cheap oil—a world in which it may ultimately take more energy to drill for oil than we can extract from the oil the wells produce.

== Interviews ==
Interviews include energy investment banking CEO Matthew Simmons, petroleum geologist Dr. Colin Campbell, former OPEC Secretary-General Fadhil Chalabi, former U.S. Representative Roscoe Bartlett, among many others.

== Findings ==
The interviewees provided the results of their analysis of current levels of proven reserves, the limited opportunities for significant oil discoveries, and the dire economic consequences of a global oil production peak. Their overall conclusions were that a global peak was imminent (if not already occurring), more wars would be fought to control access to oil resources, and economies most dependent on oil (or relying on trade with oil-dependent nations) would suffer dire consequences rivaling the Great Depression, without the benefit of cheap oil to enable a recovery.
