= Peter Tertzakian =

Canadian economist and author

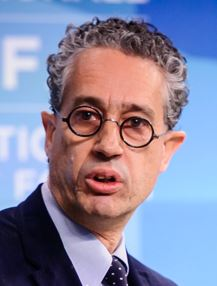
- Tertzakian at the Halifax International Security Forum 2014
- Born: 4 January 1961 (age 65); Saskatoon, Saskatchewan, Canada
- Education: University of Alberta; University of Southampton; MIT
- Occupations: Economist, investor, author, public speaker, geophysicist
- Spouse: Janet
- Children: Alexander, André (Andy)
- Website: www.arcenergyinstitute.com

Peter Tertzakian (born 1961) is a Canadian economist and author. He is the deputy director of the ARC Energy Research Institute, a managing director of energy-focused private equity firm ARC Financial Corporation, and the creator of Energyphile, a multimedia project on energy. His books examine economic, environmental and geopolitical pressures on the transformation of the global energy sector.

== Education and qualifications ==
Tertzakian has an undergraduate degree in Geophysics from the University of Alberta, and a graduate degree in Econometrics from the University of Southampton, U.K. He also holds a Master of Science in Management of Technology from the MIT Sloan School of Management. Tertzakian is an adjunct professor with the Haskayne School of Business at the University of Calgary.

== Published works ==
- The Investor Visit and Other Stories: Disruption, Denial and Transition in the Energy Business (2020). ISBN 978-1-9991113-0-4; ISBN 1999111303.
- A Thousand Barrels a Second: The Coming Oil Break Point and the Challenges Facing an Energy Dependent World (2006). ISBN 0-07-149260-7; ISBN 978-0-07-149260-7.
- The End of Energy Obesity: Breaking Today's Energy Addiction for a Prosperous and Secure Tomorrow (2009). ISBN 0-470-43544-5; ISBN 978-0-470-43544-1.
