= Hubbert linearization =

The Hubbert linearization is a way to plot production data to estimate two important parameters of a Hubbert curve, the approximated production rate of a nonrenewable resource following a logistic distribution:

- the logistic growth rate and
- the quantity of the resource that will be ultimately recovered.

The linearization technique was introduced by Marion King Hubbert in his 1982 review paper. The Hubbert curve is the first derivative of a logistic function, which has been used for modeling the depletion of crude oil in particular, the depletion of finite mineral resources in general and also population growth patterns.

Example of a Hubbert Linearization on the US Lower-48 crude oil production.

== Principle ==
The first step of the Hubbert linearization consists of plotting the yearly production data (P in bbl/y) as a fraction of the cumulative production (Q in bbl) on the vertical axis and the cumulative production on the horizontal axis. This representation exploits the linear property of the logistic differential equation:

| $\frac{dQ(t)}{dt}=P(t)=k \cdot Q(t) \cdot \left(1 - \frac{Q(t)}{URR}\right)$ | 1 |

with

- k as logistic growth rate and
- URR as the ultimately recoverable resource.

We can rewrite (1) as the following:

| $\frac{P(t)}{Q(t)}=k \cdot \left(1 - \frac{Q(t)}{URR}\right)$ | 2 |

The above relation is a line equation in the P/Q versus Q plane. Consequently, a linear regression on the data points gives us an estimate of the line slope calculated by -k/URR and intercept from which we can derive the Hubbert curve parameters:

- The k parameter is the intercept of the vertical axis.
- The URR value is the intercept of the horizontal axis.

== Examples ==
=== Global oil production ===
The geologist Kenneth S. Deffeyes applied this technique in 2005 to make a prediction about the peak of overall oil production at the end of the same year, which has since been found to be premature. He did not make a distinction between "conventional" and "non-conventional" oil produced by fracturing, aka tight oil, which has continued further growth in oil production. However, since 2005 conventional oil production has not grown anymore.

=== US oil production ===
The charts below gives an example of the application of the Hubbert Linearization technique in the case of the US Lower-48 oil production. The fit of a line using the data points from 1956 to 2005 (in green) gives a URR of 199 Gb and a logistic growth rate of 6%.

Hubbert Linearization on US's oil production

Hubbert curve on US's oil production

=== Norway oil production ===
The Norwegian Hubbert linearization estimates an URR = 30 Gb and a logistic growth rate of k = 17%.

Hubbert Linearization on Norway's oil production

Hubbert curve on Norway's oil production

== Alternative techniques ==
=== Second Hubbert linearization ===
The Hubbert linearization principle can be extended to the first derivatives of the production rate by computing the derivative of (2):

| $\frac{dP(t)/dt}{P(t)}=k \cdot \left(1 - 2\frac{Q(t)}{URR}\right)$ | 3 |

The left term, the rate of change of production per current production, is often called the decline rate. The decline curve is a line that starts at +k, crosses zero at URR/2 and ends at −k. Thus, we can derive the Hubbert curve parameters:

- The growth parameter k is the intercept of the vertical axis.
- The URR value is twice the intercept of the horizontal axis.

=== Hubbert parabola ===
This representation was proposed by Roberto Canogar and applied to the oil depletion problem. It is equation (2) multiplied by Q.

| $P(t)=kQ(t)-\frac{k}{URR}Q(t)^2$ | 4 |

The parabola starts from the origin (0,0) and passes through (URR,0). Data points until t are used by the least squares fitting method to find an estimate for URR.

=== Logit transform ===
David Rutledge applied the logit transform for the analysis of coal production data, which often has a worse signal-to-noise ratio than the production data for hydrocarbons. The integrative nature of cumulation serves as a low pass, filtering noise effects. The production data is fitted to the logistic curve after transformation using e(t) as normalized exhaustion parameter going from 0 to 1.

| $e(t) = Q(t)/URR$ | 5 |

| $\operatorname{logit} (e(t)) = -\ln \left(\frac{1}{e(t)}-1 \right) = -\ln \left(\frac{URR}{Q(t)}-1\right)$ | 6 |

The value of URR is varied so that the linearized logit gives a best fit with a maximal coefficient of determination $R^2$.
