= Sources (website) =

- Website type: Web portal
- Available in: English, German, Spanish and French
- Website: www.sources.com

Sources is a web portal for journalists, freelance writers, editors, authors and researchers, focusing especially on human sources: experts and spokespersons who are prepared to answer Reporters' questions or make themselves available for on-air interviews.

== Structure ==
The Sources website is built around a controlled-vocabulary subject index comprising more than 20,000 topics. This subject index is underpinned by an 'Intelligent Search' system which helps reporters focus their searches by suggesting additional subjects related to their search terms. For example, a search for "cancer" will suggest terms such as "chemotherapy", "melanoma", "oncology", "radiation therapy", "tobacco diseases" and "tumours", as well as topics that actually contain the word "cancer".

Each topic reference links in turn to experts and spokespersons on that topic, with profiles describing their expertise and, where relevant, their approach to the issue, along with their phone numbers and other contact information. Sources includes listings for universities and research institutes, non-profit associations and NGOs, government and public sector bodies, businesses, and individuals including academics, public speakers, and consultants.

The subject index and the search menus are being translated into French, Spanish and German to make Sources more of an international resource.

== History ==
=== Print supplement ===
Based in Canada, Sources was founded in 1977 as a print directory for reporters, editors, and story producers. It was first published as a supplement to Content magazine, an influential and controversial magazine of journalism criticism. Content, founded by Dick MacDonald in 1970 and published by Barrie Zwicker after MacDonald's death in 1974, frequently took journalists to task for always relying on the same narrow range of sources representing the same conventional points of view for their stories. Zwicker and MacDonald argued in Content and in their book The News: Inside the Canadian Media that there was a “terrible sameness” in the media's coverage of many important issues, and a shutting out of other, potentially valuable, perspectives and sources of information.

Zwicker decided to do something about the problem, and in summer 1977, Content published its first directory issue, called Sources. Billed as “A Directory of Contacts for Editors and Reporters in Canada”, Sources listed “information officers, public relations officers, media relations and public affairs people, and other contacts for groups, associations, federations, unions, societies, institutions, foundations, industries and companies and federal, provincial and municipal ministries, departments, agencies and boards.”

Explaining the rationale behind Sources, Zwicker said that “It’s a cliché that every story has two sides. An untrue cliché. Most have several. The reporter’s challenge is digging out all sides. Sources can help.” From the beginning, Zwicker saw Sources as a public service as well as a tool for journalists. He said that Sources aimed “to help promote a system of information fairness. Communications resources are equivalent to other basic needs – shelter, food, health care, for example. Everyone should have reasonable access to all.” Therefore, he said “we attempt to provide true diversity: access to people in organizations large and small, for-profit and not-for-profit, from low-tech to high-tech, long-established to just-launched.”

Zwicker told users that “within Sources you will find both mainstream and alternative information. Some may consider alternative as off to one side, not quite up to par, more or less second hand. Here at Sources ‘alternative’ is considered differently, considered as authentic and substantial, even if normally less accessible. The surprises, the jarring notes, the flashes of insight, the ‘odd takes’, the pearls of wisdom, the cries de coeur, the avant garde, tomorrow's news, the prophesies, the unfiltered, the exciting, the elsewhere-squelched, the memorable, the eccentric, the thought-out-at-length, the unmentionable in polite company, the outrageous, the uncensored ... these are what ‘alternative’ media offer. So far as we can, we will include the alternative with Sources. Sources’ driving philosophy is flat-out informational democracy enabled by user-friendly technology. The assumption is that there is a significant fraction of Canadians who want to use and benefit from such an information resource. The assumption is that a significant fraction of Canadians want to expand their search for solutions, and deepen their understandings, rather than chant conventional wisdoms (however freshly minted) to each other."

=== Separate publications ===
After a few years, Sources become so big that it could no longer fit into Content (the print directory eventually grew to more than 500 pages), and in 1981 it became an independent publication. Content itself eventually folded, but Zwicker continued to devote a substantial editorial section in Sources to coverage of topics of interest to journalists, ranging from practical topics such as grammar, style, fact-checking, photojournalism, copyright, fees for freelancers and self-publishing, to feature articles on the state of journalism and the media, to book reviews. From the early 1990s, Sources began to feature articles about online research, notably the regular feature 'Dean's Digital World' by informatics expert Dean Tudor.

=== World Wide Web ===
==== Content ====
Sources went on the Internet in 1995 and has been expanding its online portal ever since. It continues to publish a print edition of the directory, primarily for the benefit of freelancers who use it as a source of story ideas, but is now primarily a Web-based resource.

The Sources website includes not only the Sources directory itself, but a separate government directory, Parliamentary Names & Numbers; a directory of the media, Media Names & Numbers; and The Sources HotLink (www.hotlink.ca), which features articles about media relations and public relations. Also on the site is Fame and Fortune, a directory of awards, prizes, and scholarships available to writers and journalists, and a portal linked into the online archive of Connexions, a library of documents related to alternatives and social justice.

The site also houses Sources Select Resources, a large library of articles and reviews about journalism and the media, spanning a period of more than 30 years.

==== Controversy ====
While much of the editorial content has focused on the nitty-gritty of writing, editing and research, Sources has also regularly published articles that have sparked controversy on topics such as censorship and media bias. One campaign waged by Zwicker and others challenged the ethics of journalists accepting free gifts from the people they are supposed to cover. This campaign eventually led Canadian managing editors to agree among themselves that their newspapers would not accept free tickets from travel agencies, resorts, and hotels.

A series of articles by Zwicker on "War, Peace, and the Media" (later collected and published as a booklet) provoked a furor from readers upset by its criticisms of how the media cover U.S. foreign policy. As Zwicker put it in a publisher's letter in the next issue, the "reaction ranged from high praise to angry denunciation." The Toronto Sun newspaper devoted three stories to the series. The columnist Claire Hoy was left "trembling with rage" and the editor Peter Worthington felt "outraged" and a lead editorial denounced Zwicker.

Other controversial articles included one by Wendy Cukier on the public relations battle surrounding proposed gun control legislation, which drew the ire of the gun lobby. Ulli Diemer, who succeeded Zwicker as publisher in 1999, came under attack from the Fraser Institute for his article "Ten Health Care Myths: Understanding Canada’s Medicare Debate”, in which he argued that opponents of public health care were spreading mis-information designed to mislead and frighten the public.

==== New resources ====
In keeping with its mandate of encouraging a wide diversity of points of view in the media, Sources has added extra resources over time to help organizations and individuals to be heard. These include a calendar of events open to the media and a news release service which Sources members can use to distribute their statements and communiques via online posting and RSS. The releases are also subject indexed and integrated into the overall search structure for information on the Sources site.
