= Gregory Green =

Greg(ory) Green(e) may refer to:

- Greg Green (born 1963), Spokane-area based businessman and entrepreneur
- Gregory Greene, Toronto-based director of 2004 documentary film The End of Suburbia
- Gregory Green (musician), known as Grant Green Jr.
