= Beyond Oil =

2005 book by Kenneth S. Deffeyes

Beyond Oil: The View from Hubbert's Peak
- Hardcover edition
- Author: Kenneth S. Deffeyes
- Language: English
- Genre: Non-fiction
- Publisher: Hill and Wang
- Publication date: February 24, 2005
- Publication place: United States
- Media type: Print, e-book
- Pages: 224 pp.
- ISBN: 978-0809029563

Beyond Oil: The View from Hubbert's Peak is a 2005 book by Kenneth S. Deffeyes. Deffeyes was a geologist who warned of the coming oil crisis in a previous book called Hubbert's Peak.

== Overview ==
In this book, he explores the Earth's supply of potential replacement fuels for oil. Beyond Oil evaluates a range of primary energy sources ("fuels from the earth"), from petroleum to heavy oil, oil shale, tar sands, natural gas, coal, uranium, and hydrogen (which, as he notes, is actually an energy carrier and not a source), and evaluates the advantages and disadvantages of each. Finally making scientific based policy decisions is a task for all citizens.

The book begins with brief explanations of the supply problem of liquid hydrocarbons used mostly as transportation fuel. Then he explains a simpler math version of Hubbert's differential calculus to estimate what is available in the ground, see Hubbert linearization. The middle part covers the different energy resources which are available in the ground. Additionally the hydrogen path is discussed including conversion options and efficiencies from different energy forms (coal to electricity) into this gaseous energy carrier. Finally the last Chapter is an essay on the big picture from the perspective of a geologist.
