= Oil 101 =

2009 book by Morgan Downey

- Hardcover edition
- Author: Morgan Downey
- Language: English
- Subject: Oil industry
- Genre: Non-fiction
- Publisher: Wooden Table Press
- Publication date: January 1, 2009
- Publication place: United States
- Media type: Print, e-book, audiobook
- Pages: 452 pp.
- ISBN: 978-0982039205

Oil 101 is a 2009 book by New York based American commodities trader Morgan Downey. Downey has been cited in the press as an expert in oil markets, Oil 101 was called a "must read" by a Financial Times blogger. and a leading oil blog reviewed the book as an addition to its select group of top oil books.

IBM's Smarter Planet campaign currently features Oil 101 because of its efforts to improve knowledge of how oil markets work.

== See also ==
- Matthew Simmons, Twilight in the Desert: The Coming Saudi Oil Shock and the World Economy 2005 ISBN 0-471-73876-X
