= World oil market chronology from 2003 =

Chronology of events affecting the oil market

Medium term Brent oil prices since May 1987

New York Mercantile Exchange prices for West Texas Intermediate since 2000, monthly overlaid on daily prices to show the variation

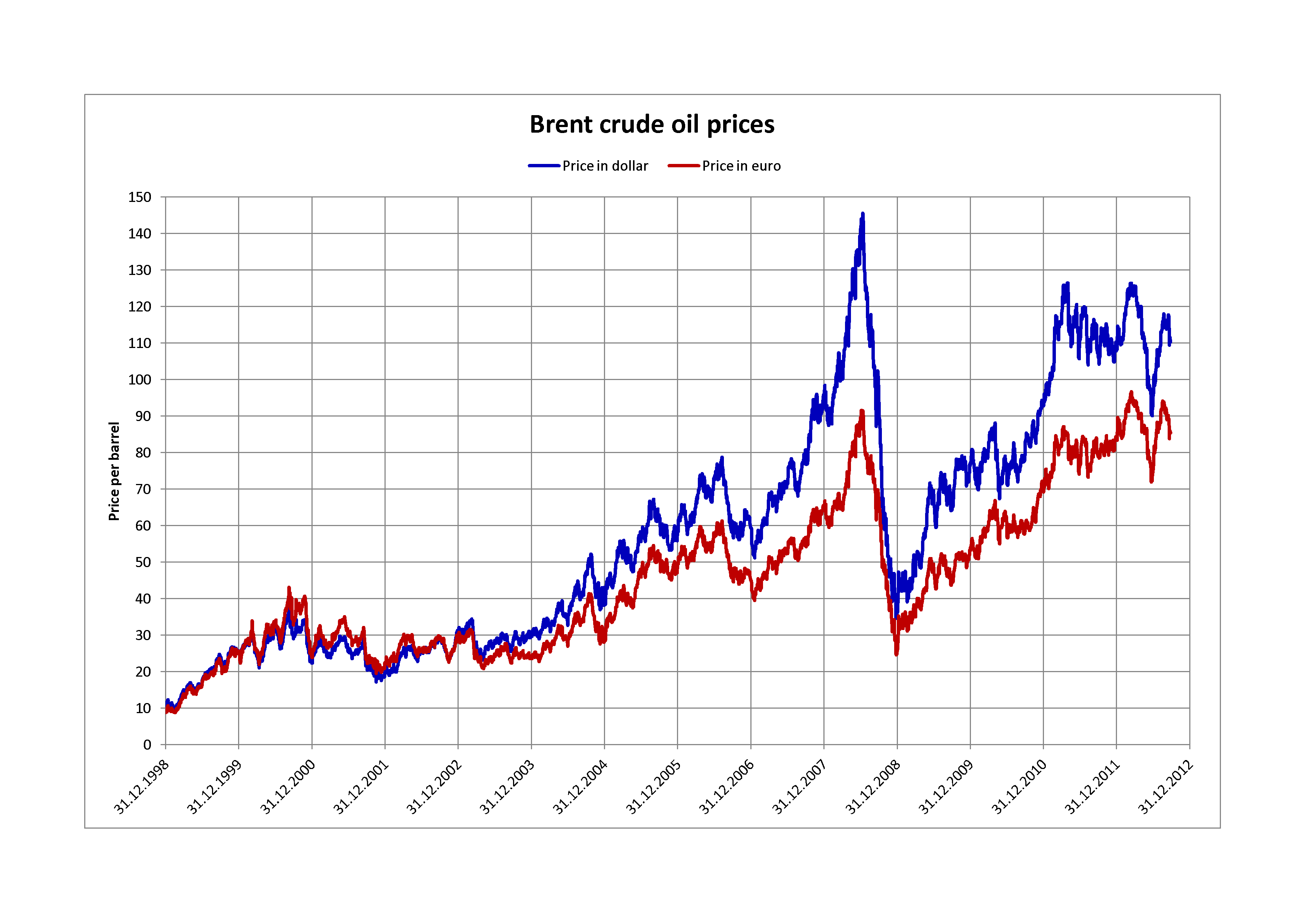
Oil prices for Brent in US$ (blue) and Euro (red)

From the mid-1980s to September 2003, the inflation-adjusted price of a barrel of crude oil on NYMEX was generally under $25/barrel. Then, during 2004, the price rose above $40, and then $60. A series of events led the price to exceed $60 by August 11, 2005, leading to a record-speed hike that reached $75 by the middle of 2006. Prices then dropped back to $60/barrel by the early part of 2007 before rising steeply again to $92/barrel by October 2007, and $99.29/barrel for December futures in New York on November 21, 2007. Throughout the first half of 2008, oil regularly reached record high prices. Prices on June 27, 2008, touched $141.71/barrel, for August delivery in the New York Mercantile Exchange, amid Libya's threat to cut output, and OPEC's president predicted prices may reach $170 by the Northern summer.

The highest recorded price per barrel maximum of $147.02 was reached on July 11, 2008. After falling below $100 in the late summer of 2008, prices rose again in late September. On September 22, oil rose over $25 to $130 before settling again to $120.92, marking a record one-day gain of $16.37. Electronic crude oil trading was temporarily halted by NYMEX when the daily price rise limit of $10 was reached, but the limit was reset seconds later and trading resumed. By October 16, prices had fallen again to below $70, and on November 6 oil closed below $60. Then in 2009, prices went slightly higher, although not to the extent of the 2005–2007 crisis, exceeding $100 in 2011 and most of 2012. Since late 2013 the oil price has fallen below the $100 mark, plummeting below the $50 mark one year later.

As the price of producing petroleum did not rise significantly, the price increases have coincided with a period of record profits for the oil industry. Between 2004 and 2007, the profits of the six supermajors – ExxonMobil, Total, Shell, BP, Chevron, and ConocoPhillips – totaled $494.8 billion. Likewise, major oil-dependent countries such as Saudi Arabia, the United Arab Emirates, Canada, Russia, Venezuela and Nigeria have benefited economically from surging oil prices during the 2000s.

The difference between West Texas Intermediate (WTI) crude and Brent crude is greater if the amount of U.S. oil is high, so prices will go down in order to get the oil off the market.

== 2003 ==
United States crude oil prices averaged $30 a barrel in 2003 due to political instability within various oil producing nations. It rose 19% from the average in 2002. The 2003 invasion of Iraq marked a significant event for oil markets because Iraq contains a large amount of global oil reserves. The conflict coincided with an increase in global demand for petroleum, but it also reduced Iraq's current oil production and has been blamed for increasing oil prices.

Oil company CEO Matthew Simmons emphasized the peaking and decline of oil-exporting in Mexico, Indonesia and the United Kingdom as the reason for the price gouging. According to Simmons, isolated events, such as the Iraq war, affect short-term prices but do not determine a long-term trend. Simmons cites the use of enhanced oil recovery techniques in large fields such as Mexico's Cantarell, which maintained production for a few years until it eventually declined.

Pumping oil out of Iraq may reduce petroleum prices in the short term, but will be unable to perpetually lower the price. From Simmons' point of view, the invasion of Iraq is associated with the start of long-term increase in oil prices, but it may mitigate the decline in oil production by retaining a partial amount of Iraq's oil reserves. As a direct consequence, the oil production capacity was diminished to 2 million barrels (320,000 m^{3}) per day.

== 2004 to 2008: rising costs of oil ==
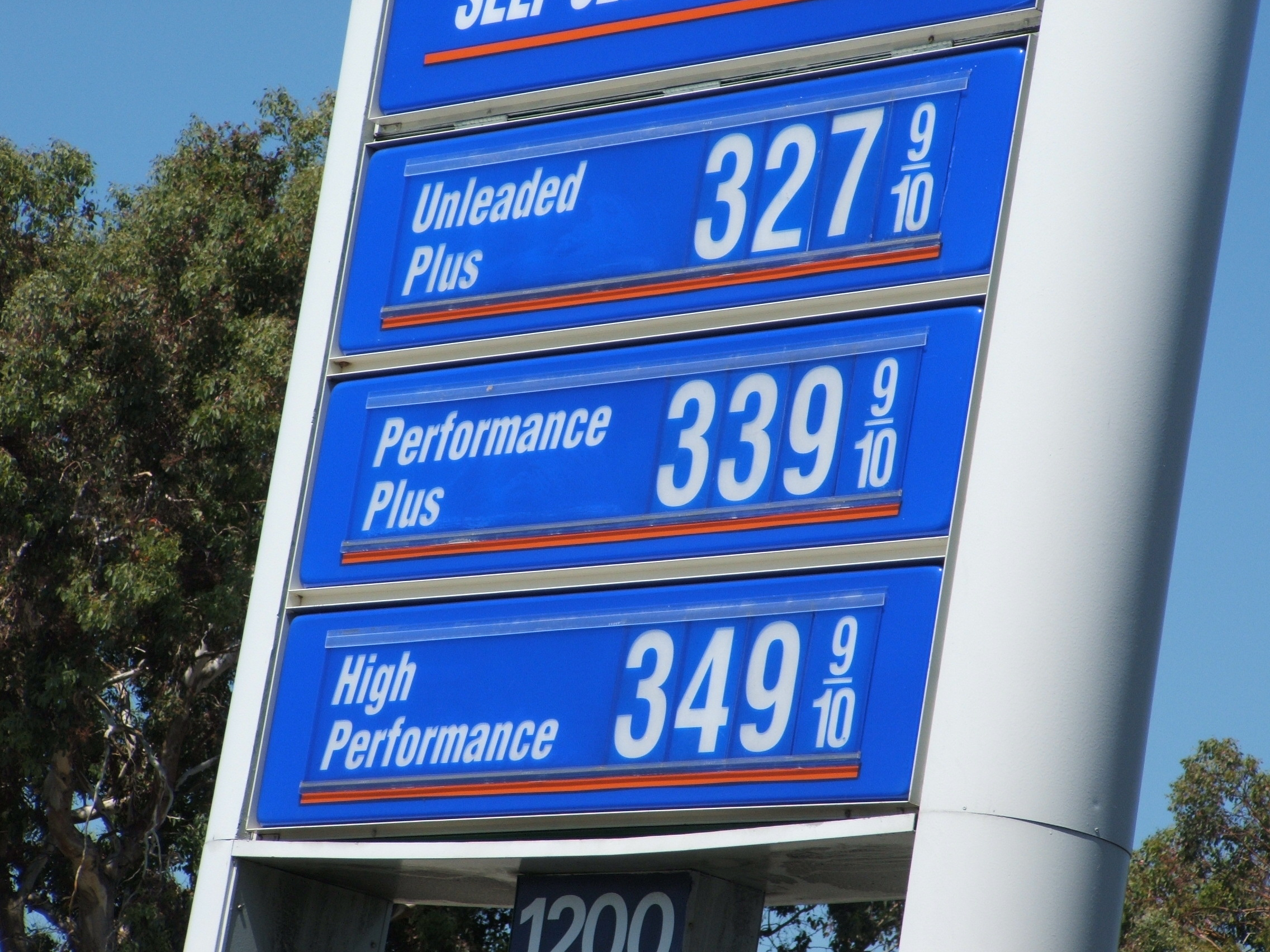
July 2006, San Francisco, California

After retreating for several months in late 2004 and early 2005, crude oil prices rose to new highs in March 2005. The price on NYMEX has been above US$50 per barrel since March 5, 2005. In June 2005, crude oil prices broke the psychological barrier of $60 per barrel.

From 2005 onwards, the price elasticity of the crude oil market changed significantly. Before 2005 a small increase in oil price lead to an noticeable expansion of the production volume. Later price rises let the production grow only by small numbers. This was the reason to call 2005 a tipping point.

After the destruction of Hurricane Katrina in the United States, gasoline prices reached a record high during the first week of September 2005. The average retail price was, on average, US$3.04 per U.S. gallon. The average retail price of a liter of petrol in the United Kingdom was 86.4p on October 19, 2006, or $6.13 per gallon. Oil production in Iraq continued to decline as result of the nation's ongoing conflict causing a decrease in production to 1 million barrels per day (160,000 m^{3}/d).

In mid-2006, crude oil was traded for over US$79 per barrel (bbl), setting an all-time record. The run-up is attributed to a 1.9 increase in gasoline consumption, geopolitical tensions resulting from North Korea's missile launch. The ongoing Iraq war, as well as Israel and Lebanon going to war are also causative factors. The higher price of oil substantially cut growth of world oil demand in 2006, including a reduction in oil demand of the OECD. After news of North Korea's successful nuclear test on October 9, 2006, oil prices rose past $60 a barrel, but fell back the next day.

On October 19, 2007, U.S. light crude rose to $90.02 per barrel due to a combination of ongoing tensions in eastern Turkey and the reducing strength of the U.S. dollar. Prices fell briefly on the expectation of increased U.S. crude oil stocks, however they quickly rose to a peak of $92.22 on October 26, 2007.

On January 2, 2008, U.S. light crude surpassed $100 per barrel before falling to $99.69 due to tensions on New Years Day in Nigeria, and on suspicion that U.S. crude stocks will have dropped for the seventh consecutive week. A BBC report from the following day stated a single trader bid up the price; Stephen Schork, a former floor trader on the New York Mercantile Exchange and the editor of an oil market newsletter, said one floor trader bought 1,000 barrels (160 m^{3}), the smallest amount permitted, and immediately sold it for $99.40 at a $600 loss. Oil fell back later in the week to $97.91 at the close of trading on Friday, January 4, in part due to a weak jobs report that showed unemployment had risen.

On March 5, 2008, OPEC accused the United States of economic "mismanagement" that was pushing oil prices to record highs, rebuffing calls to boost output and laying blame at the George W. Bush administration. Oil prices surged above $110 to a new inflation-adjusted record on March 12, 2008, before settling at $109.92. On April 18, 2008, the price of oil broke $117 per barrel after a Nigerian militant group claimed an attack on an oil pipeline. Oil prices rose to a new high of $119.90 a barrel on April 22, 2008, before dipping and then rising $3 on April 25, 2008, to $119.10 on the New York Mercantile Exchange after a news report that a ship contracted by the U.S. Military Sealift Command fired at an Iranian boat.

On June 6, prices rose $11 in 24 hours, the largest gain in history due to the possibility of an Israeli attack on Iran. The combination of two major oil suppliers reducing supply generated fears of a repeat of the 1973 oil crisis. The mid-July decision of Saudi Arabia to increase oil output caused little significant influence on prices. According to the oil minister of the Islamic Republic of Iran, Gholam-Hossein Nozari, the world markets were saturated and a Saudi promise of increased production would not lower prices. Several Asian refineries were refusing Saudi petroleum in late June because they were over priced grade.

On July 3, "the Brent North Sea crude contract for August delivery rose to $US145.01 a barrel" in Asian trade. London Brent crude reached a record of $145.75 a barrel, and Brent crude for August delivery peaked to a record $145.11 a barrel on London's ICE Futures Europe exchange, and to $144.44 a barrel on the NYMExchange. By midday in Europe, crude rose to $145.85 a barrel on the NYME while Brent crude futures rose to a trading record of $146.69 a barrel on the ICE Futures exchange.

== 2008: oil prices peak at $145.85 then bottom at $32 ==
March 2009, Dunellen, New Jersey

On July 15, 2008, a bubble-bursting sell-off began after remarks by President Bush the previous day that the ban on oil drilling would be lifted. This precipitated an $8 drop, the biggest since the first US-Iraq war. By the end of the week, crude oil fell 11% to $128, also affected by easing of tensions between the US and Iran. By August 13, prices had fallen to $113 a barrel. By the middle of September, oil price fell below $100 for the first time in over six months, falling below $92 in the aftermath of the Lehman Brothers bankruptcy.

A stronger US dollar and a likely decline in European demand were suggested to be among the causes of the decline. By October 24, the price of crude dropped to $64.15, and closed at $60.77 on November 6. By the end of December, 2008, oil had bottomed out at $32.

== 2009 ==
In January 2009, oil prices rose temporarily because of tensions in the Gaza Strip. From mid January to February 13, oil fell to near $35 a barrel.

== 2010 ==
On May 21, 2010, the price of oil had dropped in two weeks from $88 to $70 mainly due to concerns over how European countries would reduce budget deficits; if the European economy slowed down, this would mean less demand for crude oil. Also, if the euro area crisis caused the American economy to have problems, demand for oil would be reduced further. Other factors included the strong dollar and high inventories. According to the U.S. Energy Information Administration, gas prices nationwide averaged $2.91 on May 10, dropping to $2.79 two weeks later. The Deepwater Horizon oil spill was not a factor in gas prices since the well had not produced.

Prices rose back to $90/barrel in December 2010. The US average for a gallon of 87 octane regular unleaded averaged $3.00/gallon on December 23, sparking fear of a second recession if prices reached $100/barrel and $4.00/gallon gasoline, as forecasted for spring 2011. The price increases in December were based on global demand and the Arctic blasts affecting North America and Europe.

== 2011–2013 ==
=== 2011 ===
Political turmoil in Egypt, Libya, Yemen, and Bahrain drove oil prices to $95/barrel in late February 2011. A few days prior, oil prices on the NYMEX closed at $86. Oil prices topped at $103 on February 24 where oil production is curtailed to the political upheaval in Libya.

Oil supplies remained high, and Saudi Arabia assured an increase in production to counteract shutdowns. Still, the Mideast and North African crisis led to a rise in oil prices to the highest level in two years, with gasoline prices following. Though most Libyan oil went to Europe, all oil prices reacted. The average price of gasoline in the United States increased 6 cents to $3.17. On March 1, 2011, a significant drop in Libyan production and fears of more instability in other countries pushed the price of oil over $100 a barrel in New York trading, while the average price of gas reached $3.37. Despite Saudi promises, the sour type oil the country exported could not replace the more desirable sweet Libyan oil. On March 7, 2011, the average price of gas having reached $3.57, individuals were making changes in their driving.

The weakened U.S. Dollar resulted in a spike to $112/barrel with the national average of $3.74/gallon – with expectations of damaging the U.S. economy suggestive of a long-term recession. As of April 26, the national average was $3.87 – with a fear of $4/gallon as the nationwide average prior to the summer driving season.

Crude oil reached $114.83 on May 2, the highest since September 2008., The national average for gasoline rose on May 5, 2011, for the 44th straight day, reaching $3.98. However, that same day, West Texas Intermediate crude fell 9 percent, ending the day below $100 a barrel, the lowest since March 16, after the most dramatic single-day drop in over two years. Gas prices fell slightly on May 6, and experts predicted $3.50 a gallon by summer.

In mid-June, West Texas Intermediate crude for July delivery fell nearly $2 to $93.01, the lowest price since February. The dollar was up and the euro and other currencies down, and the euro area crisis made investors concerned. London Brent crude fell 81 cents to $113.21. On June 15 the Energy Information Association said oil consumption was down 3.5% from a year earlier, but wholesale gasoline demand was up for the first time in several weeks. The price of gas on June 17 was $3.67.5 a gallon, 25.1 cents lower than a month earlier but 96.8 cents above a year earlier. On June 24, the price of gas was $3.62.8 and expected to go much lower due to the opening of the Strategic Petroleum Reserve. U.S. oil prices fell below $90 before rising again, and Brent crude fell 2%.

In August, the same pessimistic economic news that caused stock prices to fall also decreased expected energy demand. On August 8, oil fell over 6%, in its largest drop since May, to $81, its lowest price of the year.

During October, the price of oil rose 22%, the fastest pace since February, as worries over the U.S. economy decreased, leading to predictions of $4 by early 2012. As of November 8, the price reached $96.80. Gas prices were not following the increase, due to lower demand resulting from the economy, the normal decrease in travel, lower oil prices in other countries, and production of winter blends which cost less. The average rose slightly to $3.41.

=== 2012 ===
The CIBC reported that the global oil industry continued to produce massive amounts of oil in spite of a stagnant crude oil market. Oil production from the Bakken formation was forecast in 2012 to grow by 600,000 barrels every year through 2016. By 2012 unconventional Canadian tight oil and oil sands production was also surging.

Shortages of oil could have resulted if Iran closed the Strait of Hormuz, through which one-fifth of exported oil travels, as a result of sanctions due to the country's nuclear policies. The price of oil stayed near $100 throughout January because of concerns over supplies, and the European debt situation. The average price of gas was $3.38 on January 20, up 17 cents from a month earlier. By early February, the national average for gasoline was $3.48, though oil prices were at $98, the lowest in six weeks, and U.S. demand was the lowest since September 2001.

On February 20, benchmark March crude oil reached $105.21, the highest in nine months. This came one day after Iran's oil ministry announced an end to sales to British and French companies; though this would have little actual impact on supplies, fears resulted in higher prices. Also, approval of the bailout plan for Greece was expected, and China's action to raise the money supply was likely to stimulate the economy. Brent crude was up 11% for the year to $119.58 on February 17, with cold weather in Europe and higher Third World demand, and West Texas Intermediate crude was up 19% to $103.24. The average price of gas was $3.53.

On April 24, gasoline was $3.85 compared to $3.86 a year earlier; it had been two years since gas prices were lower than the previous year. Crude oil prices were down; West Texas Intermediate was $103.55 a barrel, down from over $107 late in March, and Brent Crude $118.16 after peaking above $128 in March.

After falling to its lowest price since October 2011, Benchmark crude rose 5.8% to $82.18 on June 29, with Brent crude up 4.5% to $95.51. European bailout efforts during the euro area crisis included, decreasing likelihood of failures. Also, European countries decided not to buy Iranian oil. The price of gas was $3.35, the lowest since January 6.

On August 7, a California refinery fire contributed to a jump in oil futures. Other refinery problems, a pipeline leak, fears about Iran, the crisis in Syria, North Sea problems, and Tropical Storm Ernesto all contributed to a 20% jump in oil prices in six weeks. The price of gas reached $3.63 but was not expected to go much higher. Good economic news in the United States contributed to oil reaching its highest price since May on August 17, with Benchmark Crude reaching $96.01, while Brent crude fell slightly to $113.71.

In mid-December, gas prices reached $3.25, the lowest for 2012. Oil was trading for between $84 and $90.

=== 2013 ===
On January 17, with good economic news in the United States, Benchmark oil reached its highest level since September, going over $95. Brent rose above $110. On February 25, with European stock markets doing well, Benchmark crude for April rose above $94 after a significant drop the previous week due to news the Federal Reserve might end its stimulus efforts, making the dollar stronger. Brent was over $115. By mid-April, with low demand expected due to negative economic news, Brent fell to $103.04, its lowest price since July.

On July 10, oil prices were the highest in more than a year as a result of lower supplies and trouble in Egypt. In the past week, Brent had climbed 7% to $108.51. Because too much oil was being produced for the infrastructure to handle it, West Texas Intermediate was lower than Brent for several years; it returned to being consistent with Brent.

On August 28 West Texas Intermediate reached $110.10, the highest since May 2011, and Brent reached $116.61, its highest point since February 19, due to concern about U.S. involvement in Syria. Meanwhile, inventories in the United States had their biggest increase in four months.

On November 13, Brent reached $107.12 and was $13.24 higher than West Texas Intermediate, the largest difference since April, due to trouble in Libya and sanctions against Iran.

On December 27, due to a better economy in the United States leading to higher demand, oil closed about $100 for the first time since October. Gas was $3.27, two cents below a year earlier.

== 2014–2016 ==
=== 2014 ===
Cold weather led to the price of oil staying above $100 for most of February, but lower prices were expected. With United States fourth quarter economic growth expected to be lower than an early estimate, Benchmark crude fell slightly on February 27 to $102.40, with Brent crude reaching $108.61.

Ukraine problems pushed Benchmark crude above $100 and Brent crude over $108 on May 12, and further problems in Libya helped push Benchmark crude over $102 and Brent crude over $110 by May 15. Continued concerns over Ukraine and Libya pushed oil above $104.

In June 2014 crude oil prices dropped by about a third as unconventional U.S. tight oil (shale oil) production increased and China and Europe's demand for oil decreased. In spite of huge global oversupply, on 27 November 2014 in Vienna, Saudi Oil Minister Ali al-Naimi blocked the appeals from the poorer OPEC member states, such as Venezuela, Iran and Algeria, for production cuts. Brent plunged to US$71.25, a four-year low. Al-Naimi argued that the market would be left to correct itself, this will put pressure on companies in the US to reduce shale fracturing operations. OPEC had a "long-standing policy of defending prices". OPEC was ready to let the Brent oil price drop to $60 to slow down US tight oil (shale oil) production.

In spite of a troubled economy in member countries, al-Naimi repeated his statement on Saudi inaction on 10 December 2014. By the end of 2014, as the demand for global oil consumption continued to decline, the remarkably rapid oil output growth in ‘light, tight’ oil production in the North Dakota Bakken, the Permian and Eagle Ford Basins in Texas, while rejuvenating economic growth in "U.S. refining, petrochemical and associated transportation industries, rail & pipelines, destabilized international oil markets."

By December 12, both Brent and WTI reached their lowest prices since 2009; Brent dropped to $62.75 a barrel and WTI slid to $58.80 . Later in the month the price of oil was down 50% since April. Economic problems in Europe and Asia, high gas mileage, a strong dollar, higher U.S. production and no action by OPEC have been credited.

=== 2015 ===
According to Bloomberg Business, the efficiency of newer tight oil (shale oil) wells that use hydraulic fracturing in the United States, combined with the US$12 million upfront well drilling and construction costs, provided incentives to oil producers to continue to flood the already glutted market with under-priced oil in spite of crude oil storage limitations. Many less efficient and less productive older wells were shut down but these tight oil (shale oil) wells continue to increase production while making a profit in a market where crude oil is priced as low as US$50 a barrel.

The publication of the monthly review by the Organization of the Petroleum Exporting Countries reported that oil production in the United States had peaked and would start to decline in the third quarter thereby easing the global glut of crude.

After oil reached a six-year low in March, Brent crude rose 16% in April, reaching $64.95, its highest price for 2015, on April 16. U.S. crude was $56.62 on April 17. Reasons were a drop in expected tight oil (shale oil) production in the United States and the war in Yemen.

On June 10, West Texas Intermediate reached $61.43, the highest price since December. Demand was expected to stay high, but OPEC production was also staying high. Brent was $65.70.

Oil fell by about $10 in July as the U.S. dollar was strong, supplies were high, and the Chinese stock market was down. Near the end of the month, Brent crude reached $53.31, close to the lowest in six months, while U.S. crude, at $48.52, was close to a four-month low.

During August, Brent reached a low of $42.23 and U.S. crude was as low as $37.75. Then U.S. crude jumped 28% in 3 days, the most since 1990. Brent crude also climbed 28% above $54, the highest in a month.

After an International Energy Agency prediction of high supplies for the next year, U.S. crude fell the most in a week in more than two months, ending October 15 below $47, and Brent crude had its biggest loss for a week in nearly two months, just under $50 on October 16. With Middle Eastern countries producing more oil than needed and Iran expected to add even more as a result of the nuclear deal, as well as slow growth in China, U.S. crude fell below $46 on October 19 and Brent crude reached $48.51 early October 20.

On the first week of December Brent fell to $42.43 and U.S. crude slipped below $40 after OPEC first said it would increase production and then decided not to make changes. Other factors were a weak dollar and a strong Euro.

On December 21, Brent fell as low as $36.35 a barrel; this was the lowest price since July 2004. On December 30 with U.S. supplies still high, light sweet crude fell to $36.60, while Brent crude reached $36.46. Oil ended the year down 30%.

=== 2016 ===
On January 6, 2016, the price of WTI crude hit another eleven-year low, as it dropped to $32.53 a barrel for the first time since 2009. On January 12, in its seventh losing day, crude oil dropped below $30 for the first time since December 2003. OPEC encouraged production cuts, which helped prices go up before U.S. crude fell to $26.05, its lowest price since May 2003. Prices started rising when OPEC was "ready to cooperate".

On June 7, Benchmark crude closed over $50 for the first time since July 21.

Early in August, WTI fell to $41.52; oil prices had fallen more than 20% since June and were rising earlier in the week. U.S. crude fell to $43.16 on September 1, its lowest level in 3 weeks, after oil had gone up 11% for the month of August with the expectation that OPEC would limit production.

A September 26 OPEC meeting led to a decision to decrease production resulting in the biggest gains in oil prices since April. On October 10, with Russia planning to join OPEC and Algeria saying others should, Brent crude reached its highest point in a year at $53.73, while WTI hit $51.60, the highest since June 9. But after an October 29 meeting by both OPEC members and nonmembers resulted only in an agreement to meet again on November 30, oil went back down.

Saudi Arabia began attempting to persuade other OPEC countries to participate in its plan. OPEC countries met November 30 and agreed to limit output for the first time since 2008. As a result, Brent crude went over $50, the highest in a month, while West Texas intermediate stopped just short of $50.

Brent reached $57.89 and U.S. crude reached $54.51 on December 12, both the highest since July 2015, after Russia and other countries not part of OPEC also agreed to limit production. On December 27, with the output reduction to start January 1, Brent crude hit $56.09 and U.S. crude CLc1 reached $53.90. though oil fell slightly at the end of the week, with WTI ending the year at $53.72 for a 45% gain, and Brent at $56.82, up 52%. Both gains were the most since 2009.

== 2017–2019 ==
=== 2017 ===
Despite the promises of lower output from other countries, no evidence of changes was seen. U.S. output was higher and oil continued to fall. With U.S. production and inventories up, even a lower dollar and decreased production by OPEC nations did not cause oil prices to rise as much as they could have. WTI reached $53.07 and Brent crude $55.44 on January 26.

Crude inventories set a record so oil continued to fall through March, with WTI reaching just above $47 and Brent falling below $50. After Saudi Arabia announced plans to continue lower production beyond the first half of 2017, oil went higher in April before falling again despite plans to continue lower production. In June OPEC production actually went up and with high worldwide supplies and high U.S. production, oil reached its lowest level in six months in June. With higher U.S. demand and lower inventories, oil finally turned around and reached its highest level in two and a half months on August 9.

Brent rose 40% from June to October as oil producers were expected to continue lower production, with an increase of 20% in the third quarter, the most for the quarter since 2004, and reaching $59.49 during the final week of September. The increase would have been more but Turkey did not act on a threat to close a pipeline as a result of the Kurdistan vote for independence. U.S. oil inventories were down 15% since March and lower than in 2016 due to higher exports resulting from WTI being significantly lower than Brent.

In November, WTI reached $57.92, highest since July 2015, and Brent crude $64.65, highest since June 2015. Demand was high, and OPEC cuts and "rising political tensions" were other reasons. During the last week of 2017, WTI went over $60 for the first time since June 2015 before falling back to $59.69, while Brent crude passed $67 for the first time since May 2015 before falling to $66.50. Pipeline problems in Libya and the North Sea added to production cuts by OPEC and Russia.

=== 2018 ===
Both WTI and Brent crude began the year above $60 for the first time since 2014. With U.S. inventories the lowest in three years, and cold weather decreasing U.S. production, oil reached its highest price since December 2014 in mid-January. On January 15, Brent crude reached $70.37, and the next day, WTI hit $64.89. U.S. production increased and demand was predicted to go down when winter was over, so prices went down.

WTI ended March at $64.94, up 5.6% for the month and 7.7% for the first quarter. Brent finished at $70.27 for an increase of 8.6% for the month and 6.3% for the quarter. Possible sanctions on Iran, OPEC's desire for higher prices, and lower production in Venezuela were reasons.

On April 11, with the United States planning a response to the Douma chemical attack in the Syrian Civil War, WTI ended the day at $66.82, with Brent at $72.04, both the highest since December 2014. In May WTI reached its highest level in three and half years twice. Brent rose for the sixth week in a row, the most since 2011, going over $80 for the first time since November 2014 the previous day.

With OPEC's announcement that it would keep production low through the rest of 2018, WTI finished May 30 at $68.21. Brent finished at $77.50. The difference between WTI and Brent was increasing, possibly due to tight oil (shale oil).

WTI ended the first half of 2018 up about 23% to $74.15, the highest since November 2014, up 14% for the second quarter and 11% for the month. Brent crude was $79.44. Factors included threats to supplies from Libya and proposed sanctions on countries importing oil from Iran.

In November oil fell the most for any month in ten years. WTI finished at $50.93, up 1% for the week but down 22% for the month, while Brent was $58.71, down 12% for the year. Higher production in the U.S., Russia and some OPEC countries meant too much supply. Losses would have been higher except for speculation about OPEC cuts.

For the week ending December 21, WTI fell 11.4% to $45.59, the lowest since July 2017, and Brent crude fell 10.7% to $53.82, the lowest since September 2017. Higher U.S. interest rates, more active U.S. oil rigs, higher U.S. crude production and lower expected worldwide demand did not cancel out proposed production cuts by OPEC nations, including definite plans by Saudi Arabia.

Brent finished 2018 down 20 percent.

=== 2019 ===
Oil finished January up 18.5 percent (the best ever with records going back as far as 1984) with WTI at $53.79 one day after its highest finish since November, and Brent up 15 percent for the month to $61.89; both gains were the most for a month since April 2016. A major factor was an announcement of expected production cuts by Saudi Arabia, though higher U.S. gasoline stocks kept oil from going even higher. U.S. crude supplies were lower than expected and sanctions on Venezuela also contributed.

WTI rose 6.4 percent in February while Brent crude went up 6.7 percent. On March 1, WTI fell 2.5 percent to end the week at $55.80 while Brent crude fell 1.9 percent to $65.07. This was true even though OPEC output reached its lowest level in four years. U.S. economic reports indicated slower growth.

The third week of April ended with WTI at $64 for its seventh gain for the first time since February 2014. Brent rose for the fourth week, ending at $71.97. On April 22, WTI rose to $66.30, with the highest settlement since October resulting from the Trump administration ending waivers for Iranian oil exports, even though U.S. President Donald Trump tweeted that other countries would make up the difference. Though WTI fell due to higher U.S. crude supplies, Brent reached the highest close since October on April 24 before falling to $74.35 the next day.

Trump's plans to raise tariffs of imports from China contributed as WTI fell for three weeks straight. On May 23 when oil fell the most in a day since December (also falling below the 200-day moving average), WTI finished at $57.21, lowest since March 12, in a week when WTI lost nearly 7 percent; Brent finished the week at $68.69 for a nearly 5 percent loss. The declines for the week were the most all year. The trade war with China caused concerns, though possible actions by Trump helped slightly on May 24.

WTI rose almost 9 percent for the week ending June 21, the most since December 2016, to $57.43, the highest finish for the month. Brent was up 5 percent to $65.20. Reasons for the jump included expectations of the Federal Reserve lowering interest rates and Iran shooting down a drone.

WTI fell 7.9 percent on August 1, the most in one day in four years, to $53.95, the lowest since June 19. The next day WTI finished the week down, in response to Trump's plans for more tariffs. Brent fell 7 percent on August 1 and also ended the week lower. Later in the month, Tom Kloza, global head of energy analysis at the Oil Price Information Service, said this was proof a presidential tweet could affect world markets.

On August 19, the difference between WTI and Brent was $3.53, the lowest since July 2018. At the start of the year it was twice that. More pipeline capacity was a reason. The China–United States trade war was not a factor. As of September 5 WTI was up 24 percent to $56.30 while Brent increased 13 percent to $60.95.

As of November 25, Brent was up 19 percent for the year.

== 2020–2022 ==
=== 2020 ===
On February 10, oil reached its lowest level in over a year, with the COVID-19 pandemic a major reason. WTI fell 1.5 percent to $49.57, the lowest since January 2019, and Brent dropped 2.2 percent to $53.27, the lowest since December 2018. Russia had not agreed to further production cuts, though OPEC had a plan. WTI ended February 28 down more than 16 percent for the week, the most in 11 years, falling 5 percent to $44.76 on February 28. Brent closed at $50.52. Both were the lowest since December 2018. Warmer than usual weather was one reason but the major factor was concerns about economic slowdown due to COVID-19.

During the 2020 Russia–Saudi Arabia oil price war, on March 8 oil fell over 30 percent. WTI reached $31.13, down 24.6 percent, with Brent $34.36, down 24.1 percent. Both were the lowest since 2016 and the one-day decline was the largest since 1991. On a week when oil fell the most since 2014, Russia rejected plans by OPEC and others to help calm the oil market, and Saudi Arabia was expected to increase production.

In the first quarter, the percentage loss was the worst ever, 66.5 percent for WTI and 65.6 percent for Brent. Then on April 2, WTI jumped 24.7 percent to $25.32 and Brent rose 21 percent to $29.94, the biggest percentage increase in a single day ever, in anticipation of significant production cuts. OPEC agreed to production cuts on April 12; these would be greater in 2020 than in future years. U.S. crude supplies had risen for 12 weeks, including the largest increase for a week as of April 10. On April 14, the difference between the front month contract and contracts for later delivery were the most since 2009 for WTI, which traded $14.45 below the September contract. On April 20, the front month contract for WTI fell below zero, an unprecedented event. With the contract for May delivery expiring on April 21, the contract for June delivery became the new front month contract; on April 22 after settling at $13.78, WTI was the lowest since the 1990s.

On July 15, after the largest drop in U.S. crude supplies of the year, WTI reached $41.20 and Brent $43.79, the highest since March 6 for both. That same day, OPEC and others said they planned to decrease production cuts in August but FXTM analyst Lukman Otunuga said it might not be the time for that given the chances of more COVID-19 related lockdowns or problems with the world economy. Bad news about U.S. unemployment, a strong dollar, lower expected demand, and higher U.S. crude supplies contributed to the second down week for WTI, which fell 6.1 percent to $37.33. Brent fell 6.6 percent for the week to $39.83. This was the first time oil fell for two straight weeks since April.

As a result of U.S. President Donald Trump being diagnosed with COVID-19, WTI fell 4.3 percent on October 2 to finish the week down 8 percent at $37.05, the lowest since September 8. Brent dropped 4.1 percent and 7.4 percent for the week to $39.27, the lowest since June 12. Continued concerns about the pandemic reducing demand also contributed even as U.S. supplies fell.

WTI and Brent both reached their highest settlements since September on November 18, with WTI at $41.82 and Brent at $44.34. One major factor was good news about COVID-19 vaccines. U.S. crude inventories rose more than expected, and uncertainty about OPEC and COVID-19 lockdowns contributed to lower prices the next day. Just before Thanksgiving, gas was $2.11, the lowest at that time of year since 2016 and 49 cents lower than a year earlier.

WTI ended 2020 at $48.52, down 20.5 percent in its second down year in three years but up 7 percent for the month and more than 20 percent for the quarter. Brent finished at $51.80, down 21.5 percent for the year but up 8.9 percent for December and 26.5 percent for the quarter. A weak dollar and lower than expected U.S. inventories kept oil high.

=== 2021 ===
WTI rose over 50 percent during the first half of 2021 and Brent jumped 45 percent, reaching their highest levels in two and a half years. In June alone WTI jumped more than 10 percent, with Brent up 8 percent. On July 2, WTI was at $74.28 and Brent was at $75.76. COVID-19 vaccines, easing of restrictions related to the pandemic, and production cuts by OPEC and allies were factors. As of September 10, Brent was up 41 percent for the year due to OPEC supply cuts and increased demand after the worst of the pandemic seemed to be over. A month later both WTI and Brent were 60 percent higher than at the start of the year. OPEC and other nations were limiting production increases as increased COVID-19 infections still showed the potential to hurt demand. By October 19 WTI had increased 21 percent and Brent 19 percent just since the start of September.

Brent reached $86.70, the highest since 2018, during October. WTI reached $85.41 on October 25, the highest in seven years, and fell 11.5 percent by November 19, still up 55 percent for the year.

WTI ended 2021 at $75.21, up 55.5 percent, while Brent finished at $77.78, up 50.5 percent. This was the biggest gain for the year since 2016.

=== 2022 ===
As of February 3, WTI traded over $90 for the first time since October 2014, a week after Brent did the same. WTI was up 20 percent for the year. A week after Russia invaded Ukraine, Brent was up about 25 percent to more than $110. It eventually peaked at $139.13, highest since 2008. As of March 7, Brent was at $125, up 35 percent in a month and 60 percent for the year, and gas was $4 per gallon for the first time since 2008. Just over a week later Brent was down nearly 30 percent, settling below $100 for the first time in March, with expected production increases by some OPEC nations and COVID-19 restrictions in China. Gas was still $4.32.

WTI ended the quarter up 34 percent with Brent up 38 percent, the most since second quarter 2020.

On May 8, Saudi Arabia cut oil prices for buyers in Asia, countering uncertainty around Russia's supplies. The state-controlled company dropped its key Arab Light crude grade for the next month's shipments to Asia to $4.40 a barrel above the benchmark it uses, from $9.35 in May. Also in May, Saudi Arabia lowered the price of its Arab Light crude grade to Europe for the month of June. The price of the Arab Light benchmark sold in the US in June remained the same, at $5.65 per barrel above the Argus Sour Crude Index. Meanwhile, Kuwait became the second-largest OPEC member to cut its prices for Asia, after Saudi Arabia.

In June, Brent peaked at $123 and gas was over $5 because of fears Russian oil would no longer be sold, but Russia continued to sell oil in Asia at low prices. Fear of a recession outweighed concerns over Russia, and by the time OPEC and other nations decided on a small cut in production on September 5, Brent was $96.50 and WTI $89.79. Gas was $3.82. Just over a week later both indexes were down 20 percent for the quarter, the most since the pandemic began in 2020. Then WTI fell below $80 for the first time all year. Interest rate increases also contributed to oil's decline.

For the third quarter, Brent fell 23 percent, ending at $87.96, and WTI fell 25 percent, finishing at $79.49. In the last three weeks of 2022, Brent and WTI jumped 13 percent. For the year, Brent climbed 10 percent, finishing at $85.91, and WTI climbed 7 percent to $80.26. Though the gains were much smaller, 2022 was the second year of increases for both.

== 2023–2025 ==
=== 2023 ===
As a result of the March 2023 United States bank failures, both indexes reached their lowest point since 2021. The first quarter ended with Brent at $79.89, down 5 percent for the month and for the first time since 2015, down for the third straight quarter. WTI finished down 2 percent for the month, at $75.67. Because of negative economic news worldwide and the prospect of lower demand, oil finished down for the fourth straight quarter, with Brent ending second quarter 2023 at $74.90, down 6 percent, and WTI at $70.64, down 6.5 percent.

After six weeks of gains, WTI was up 20 percent to $82.82 on August 4, and Brent finished at $86.24, up 17 percent. Saudi Arabia agreed to continue production cuts, while Russia was reducing exports, while demand was expected to increase. Gas peaked at $3.88 in the United States on September 18. WTI peaked at $93.68 on September 27 before falling 8.8 percent during the first full week of October. The gain for the year was 3.15 percent.

The first full week of December was the seventh week of declines, the longest streak since 2018, with Brent finishing at $75.18 and WTI at $71.23. Both dropped nearly 4 percent for the week and reaching their lowest point since June on December 7. Oil ended the year down 10 percent, finishing at the lowest year-end level since 2020. Brent was at $77.04 and WTI at $71.65.

=== 2024 ===
Brent, finishing the quarter at $87.48, and WTI, which settled at $83.17, rose for each of the first three months of the year. High demand, supply problems and the Middle East conflict resulted in WTI rising 19 percent for the year as of April 11 when it finished at $85.66. The next day Brent was up 18 percent for the year, finishing over $91.

In September Brent fell below $70 for the first time since December 2021. The next month U.S. production set a record. U.S. demand reached its highest level since the COVID-19 pandemic.

Brent ended 2024 down 3 percent, the second down year. Brent finished at $74.64 and WTI at $71.72, about even with where it started 2024. Demand stopped increasing, China had economic problems and oil producers increased the amount they sold. Also, Russia's invasion of Ukraine became less of a factor.

=== 2025 ===
Due to the inclusion of WTI Midland in the Brent index, Brent was more closely related to freight rates. The premium for Brent over WTI stayed below $4 during May. On June 6, the difference between WTI and Brent was $2.78, lowest since September 2023, due to OPEC and others increasing production while the U.S. oil rig count decreased and the 2025 Canadian wildfires interfered with supplies.

U.S. production hit a record in October. Oil finished October down, with Brent at $65.07 and WTI reaching $60.98.

Brent and WTI ended November down for the fourth month in a row. Brent ended at $63.20 and WTI at $58.55.

Brent ended 2025 down 19 percent for the year to $60.85, the biggest drop since 2020. It was also the third straight down year, the longest streak ever. WTI ended the year down by about the same amount at $57.42. Too much oil after OPEC and others increased production, wars, sanctions on some oil-producing countries, and tariffs were major factors determining 2025 prices.

== 2026–present ==
=== 2026 ===
Nearly three months after the 2026 Iran war on February 28, Brent and WTI had increased more than 50 percent. Nearly a month later, oil was still more than 20 percent higher than before the war. As of June 19, Brent was down 36 percent from its high at $80.57. Brent fell 21 percent in June, the most for a month since March 2020. WTI fell over 20 percent, the most in a month since late 2021. In July, oil jumped more than 30 percent with increased fighting in the Middle East.

As of September 17, oil was up 18 percent for the month.
