= Barrie Zwicker =

Canadian journalist (born 1934)

- Born: Barrie Wallace Zwicker; November 5, 1934 (age 91); White Haven, Nova Scotia, Canada
- Occupations: journalist documentary producer activist

Barrie Wallace Zwicker (born November 5, 1934) is a Canadian alternative media journalist, documentary producer, and political activist.

He is best known for his documentary work, which has dealt primarily with 9/11 conspiracy theories.

== Biography ==
Barrie Zwicker was born in White Haven, Nova Scotia. His family soon moved to Manitoba, and Zwicker's earliest work in journalism was with the Russell Banner, a local newspaper in Manitoba, at the age of 16. He went on to study journalism at University of Michigan. In 1967, Zwicker earned a Southam Fellowship allowing him to work with media analysis pioneer, Marshall McLuhan at St. Michael's College.

Zwicker became a staff writer at a variety of newspapers in Canada and the United States, including The Globe and Mail, Toronto Star, Vancouver Province, Sudbury Star, Detroit News, and Lansing State Journal. During his seven-year tenure at The Globe and Mail, he won several awards with the Education Writers' Association of North America.

Zwicker also taught the Media and Society course at Ryerson Polytechnic University in Toronto as a part-time professor for seven years. He worked as Vision TV's media critic since the multifaith network's inception in the fall of 1988, until 2003.

Zwicker and Dick MacDonald edited The News: Inside the Canadian Media, in which Zwicker argued that there was a "terrible sameness" in the media's coverage of many important issues, and a shutting out of other, potentially valuable, perspectives and sources of information. Zwicker took over as publisher of Content magazine founded by MacDonald in 1970. He continued his media criticism in the pages of Content and subsequently in the pages of Sources, which he published from 1977 on. Sources is a directory of contacts for editors, reporters and researchers. In 1994, he created a Canadian government directory called Parliamentary Names & Numbers. He subsequently sold these publications in 1999.

In 1983 Zwicker wrote War, Peace, and the Media, a 48-page pamphlet which argued that Canadian and American press coverage of the USSR was unbalanced, "creating a stereotype of a country that is the embodiment of everything evil, with which it is impossible to have civilized dealings or to conclude rational agreements, notably on arms control. The result of the press coverage is to push people to the conclusion that the only way to deal with the USSR is to engage in an arms race that can only result in eventual war."

== Alternative viewpoints and 9/11 conspiracy works ==
=== The End of Suburbia ===
He was involved in making the video The End of Suburbia: Oil Depletion and the Collapse of The American Dream on Vision TV, and earned a number of awards from local film and video festivals for his contributions.

=== The Great Conspiracy: The 9/11 News Special You Never Saw ===
The Great Conspiracy: The 9/11 News Special You Never Saw is a 70-minute sequel to The Great Deception. It premiered at The Citizens' Commission on 9-11. In this work, Zwicker contends that fear was used to control the public after 9/11, and states that the "war on terrorism" is a public control mechanism. He also analyses the military breakdown on 9/11 and claims that the president and his aides acted entirely inappropriately that day. Throughout, mainstream media is accused of being either compliant or complicit with a cover-up.

== Other accomplishments ==
- In 1996, he founded a media relations newsletter and Web site called HotLink.
- In 1991, he was awarded an honorary membership in the Media Club of Canada.
