= Colin Campbell (geologist) =

British petroleum geologist (1931–2022)

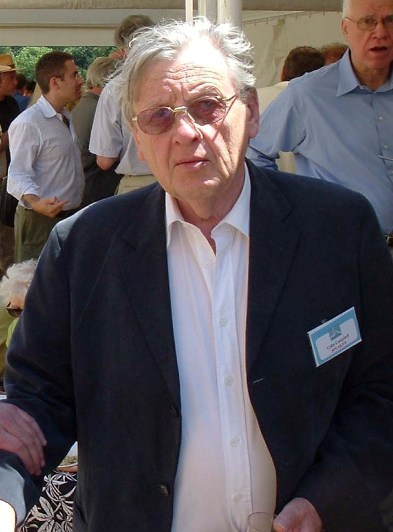
- Campbell in Italy in 2006
- Born: 24 July 1931; Berlin, Brandenburg, Prussia, Germany
- Died: 13 November 2022 (aged 91); Ballydehob, County Cork, Ireland
- Education: St Paul's, Oxford (MA, DPhil)
- Occupations: Geologist, author
- Spouse: Bobbins Campbell
- Children: 2

Colin J. Campbell (24 July 1931 – 13 November 2022) was a British petroleum geologist who predicted that oil production would peak by 2007. He claimed the consequences of this are uncertain but drastic, due to the world's dependency on fossil fuels for the vast majority of its energy. His theories have received wide attention but are disputed and have not significantly changed governmental energy policies at this time. To deal with declining global oil production, he proposed the Rimini protocol.

Influential papers by Campbell include The Coming Oil Crisis, written with Jean Laherrère in 1998 and credited with convincing the International Energy Agency of the coming peak; and The End of Cheap Oil, published the same year in Scientific American.

The Association for the Study of Peak Oil and Gas, founded by Campbell in 2000, has been gaining recognition in the recent years. The association has organised yearly international conferences since 2002. The most recent conference of the USA chapter (ASPO-USA) was at the University of Texas in Austin, TX on 30 November and 1 December 2012.

== Remarks ==
The most famous peak oil petrogeologist is M. King Hubbert, who predicted in 1956 that oil production would peak in the United States between 1965 and 1970. US oil production hit a peak in 1970. Hubbert's theories, particularly his evaluation of oil availability in any given area reaching a peak, to be followed by inevitable and sometimes rapid decline, were expounded in his Hubbert peak theory, and became popular during the 1973 energy crisis, and during the 1979 energy crisis when even the United States Secretary of Energy, James Schlesinger announced, as he left his post that year, that 'Mid-East production is unlikely to expand much, if at all, and is unlikely to drop below current levels'. (Wall Street Journal 1979). In December 2000 Colin Campbell warned in a public lecture held at the Clausthal University of Technology that

'There is, I think, a strong danger of some ill-considered military intervention to try to secure oil. A stock market crash seems inevitable, as some investment managers are now telling us. The global market may collapse because of high transport costs and global recession. Self-sufficiency will become a priority.'

== Current debate ==
Global oil discovery peaked in 1964, and since the early 1980s oil production has outpaced new discoveries.

According to Campbell:

- There are no new potential oil fields sufficiently large enough to reduce this future energy crisis.
- The reported oil reserves of many OPEC countries are inflated, to increase their quotas, or improve their chance of getting a loan from the World Bank.
- The practice of gradually adding new discoveries to a country's list of proven reserves, instead of all at once, artificially inflates the current rate of discovery.

In 1989 Campbell claimed that there would be a shortage towards the late 1990s. In 1990 he claimed that 1998 would represent a "depletion midpoint." These early assessments were, however, according to Campbell himself, "based on public domain data, before the degree of misreporting by industry and governments was appreciated."

A 2007 study of oil depletion by the UK Energy Research Centre stated that Campbell failed to take into account future reserve growth in existing fields. The authors concluded that curve-fitting techniques, such as Campbell's, tended to underestimate ultimate recoverable reserves. The report cited Campbell's record of premature peak predictions, systematically shifting forward over time, as evidence that his methodology was flawed.

The US Department of Energy report Peaking of World Oil Production: Impacts, Mitigation, and Risk Management, often referred to as the Hirsch Report, proposes an urgent mitigation approach to deal with the possibility of oil production going into decline in the immediate future.

It states: "The peaking of world oil production presents the US and the world with an unprecedented risk management problem. As peaking is approached, liquid fuel prices and price volatility will increase dramatically, and, without timely mitigation, the economic, social, and political costs will be unprecedented. Viable mitigation options exist on both the supply and demand sides, but to have substantial impact, they must be initiated more than a decade in advance of peaking."

== Activities ==
Campbell had over 40 years of experience in the oil industry. He was educated at St Paul's School and Wadham College, Oxford (BA Geology 1954, MA and DPhil 1957), and worked as a petroleum geologist in the field, as a manager, and as a consultant. He was employed by Oxford University, Texaco, British Petroleum, Amoco, Shenandoah Oil, Norsk Hydro, and Petrofina, and worked with the Bulgarian and Swedish governments. His writing included two books and more than 150 papers.

Later, he founded the Association for the Study of Peak Oil and Gas, was affiliated with Petroconsultants in Geneva, was a trustee of the Oil Depletion Analysis Centre in London. He conducted research on the oil peak, and he also tried to build public awareness of the issue, which included lecturing extensively. He addressed a committee of the British House of Commons, and officials from investment and automotive companies. He appeared in the documentary films The End of Suburbia, Crude Awakening: The Oil Crash, and Peak Oil – Imposed by Nature.

== Personal life ==
Campbell resided in Ballydehob, a small town in South West Cork, Ireland with his wife Bobbins. He died at his home in Ireland on 13 November 2022, at the age of 91.

== Quotes ==
"But this peak has no real great significance, it is the perception and the vision of the long decline that comes into sight on the other side of the peak. That's really what matters." (speaking on the peak oil phenomenon, from End of Oil (2005))

"It's quite a simple theory and one that any beer drinker understands. The glass starts full and ends empty and the faster you drink it the quicker it's gone." (on peak oil, in 2007)

"Banks had been lending more than they had on deposit assuming that tomorrow's growth was collateral for today's debt but failing to see that growth depends on growing, cheap, oil-based energy...So in short, Peak Oil means that debt goes bad." (speaking on the 2008 crash at the New Energy Era Forum, 8 May 2012)

== See also ==
- Kenneth S. Deffeyes
- Jean Laherrère
- Thomas Malthus, and the Malthusian catastrophe.
- Dale Allen Pfeiffer
