= Michael Ruppert =

American writer and investigative journalist (1951-2014)

Michael C. Ruppert
- Born: Michael Craig Ruppert; February 3, 1951; Washington, D.C., US
- Died: April 13, 2014 (aged 63); Calistoga, California, US
- Other name: Tracker of Truth
- Education: B.A., UCLA, 1973
- Occupations: Investigative journalist Publisher; Talk show host LAPD Police officer
- Employer: Los Angeles Police Department (1973–1978)
- Known for: Whistleblower and author of Crossing The Rubicon

Michael Craig Ruppert (February 3, 1951 – April 13, 2014) was an American writer and musician, Los Angeles Police Department officer, investigative journalist, political activist, and peak oil awareness advocate known for his 2004 book Crossing The Rubicon: The Decline of the American Empire at the End of the Age of Oil.

From 1999 until 2006, Ruppert edited and published From The Wilderness, a newsletter and website covering a range of topics including international politics, the CIA, peak oil, civil liberties, drugs, economics, corruption and the nature of the 9/11 conspiracy. It attracted 22,000 subscribers.

Ruppert was the subject of the 2009 documentary film Collapse, which is based on his book A Presidential Energy Policy. The film received The New York Times "critics pick". He served as president of Collapse Network, Inc. from early 2010 until he resigned in May 2012. He also hosted The Lifeboat Hour on Progressive Radio Network until his death in 2014.

In 2014, Vice featured Ruppert in a 6-part series titled Apocalypse, Man. A tribute album, Beyond the Rubicon, was released that year by the band New White Trash, of which he had been a member.

== Early life and education ==
Michael Ruppert was born on February 3, 1951, in Washington, D.C. According to Ruppert, his father, Ernest Charles Edward Ruppert III, had been a pilot in the US Air Force during World War II and later worked for Martin Marietta, functioning as a liaison between the company, the CIA, and the Air Force. He said that his mother, Madelyn, was a cryptanalyst at the National Security Agency, working in a unit that cracked Soviet codes in order to track their nuclear physicists.

The family moved fourteen times, living in seven different states, eventually settling in Los Angeles where Ruppert attended Venice High School, graduating in 1969. He then attended UCLA, earning a B.A. in Political Science in 1973. Ruppert said that during his senior year, he applied and interviewed for a position with the CIA but ended up turning down the subsequent offer, instead accepting a position with the Los Angeles Police Department.

== Los Angeles Police Department (1973–1978) ==

Ruppert joined the Los Angeles Police Department in 1973. He was assigned to handle narcotics investigations in the most dangerous neighborhoods of Los Angeles. Beginning in 1976, he made discoveries that led him to believe that he had stumbled onto a large network of narcotics traffickers and that the US military and the LAPD might be involved. He resigned from the force in November 1978.

== Activism ==
On November 15, 1996, then Director of Central Intelligence John Deutch visited Los Angeles' Locke High School for a town hall meeting. At the meeting, Ruppert publicly confronted Deutch, saying that in his experience as an LAPD narcotics officer he had seen evidence of CIA complicity in drug dealing.

He went on to become an investigative journalist and established the publication From The Wilderness, a watchdog publication that exposed governmental corruption, including his experience with CIA drug dealing activities.

Ruppert is the author of Crossing The Rubicon: The Decline of the American Empire at the End of the Age of Oil, published in September 2004. Crossing The Rubicon suggests that Vice President Dick Cheney, the US government, and Wall Street had a well-developed awareness of and colluded with the perpetrators of 9/11.

Ruppert correctly predicted the 2008 financial crisis three years early.

=== From The Wilderness ===
From The Wilderness was a newsletter published from 1998 to 2006 by the media company, From The Wilderness Publications. The newsletter covered political and governmental issues. It was published eleven times per year with weekly updates online.

In mid-2006, claiming government harassment, and fearing for his life, Ruppert left the United States with Raul Santiago for Venezuela, vowing not to return. The Ashland Daily Tidings reported that, in June 2006, Ruppert had accused a former female employee of burglarizing the offices of From The Wilderness, a case in which Ruppert was considered a potential suspect. Around the same time, the former female employee accused him in turn of sexual harassment. She said that Ruppert had fired her after she refused his sexual advances. Ruppert denied that he had sexually harassed her, and said that "the case was based on a deliberate attempt to discredit his work, a movie coming out about his views and his former newsletter, From The Wilderness." In 2009, Ruppert was ordered to pay a $125,000 fine by the Oregon labor board in the case.

The end of From The Wilderness was announced and explained in a post at the website on November 7, 2006. Ruppert cited his bad health, glitches that disabled their web store, "problems of human origin", and his departure to Venezuela. After shutting down, From the Wilderness was sued by their landlord for unpaid rent owed on their Ashland office space. Later that year, Ruppert flew to Toronto, Canada, for medical treatment. The following statement was posted on the From The Wilderness website on November 26, 2006:

Personally, I am through forever with investigative journalism and public lecturing. I am leaving public life. It is my hope that by continuing to repeat this sincere position that many of the inexplicable difficulties which have dominated my life over the past months will ease. It is time to move on. I spent twenty-seven years as a dedicated public activist and that is something which I am no longer able or inclined to do. The price was ultimately too great.

=== Collapse and the Collapse Network ===
Ruppert and his theories on peak oil were the subject of the 2009 documentary film Collapse, which was based on his book A Presidential Energy Policy and received The New York Times "critics pick". The book, Confronting Collapse: The Crisis of Energy and Money in a Post Peak Oil World was released in December 2009.

Peak oil, an event based on M. King Hubbert's theory, is the point in time when the maximum rate of extraction of petroleum is reached, after which the rate of production is expected to enter terminal decline. Peak oil theory is based on the observed rise, peak, (sometimes rapid) fall, and depletion of aggregate production rate in oil fields over time.

In early 2010, Ruppert launched the Collapse Network to build sustainable communities across the world. In 2011 he announced on his Lifeboat Hour radio show that he was relocating to Sonoma County, California, because he thought that it would be a safer location in the event of societal collapse. He left the Collapse Network in May 2012, leaving it in the hands of former From the Wilderness associate and longtime friend, Jenna Orkin. Ruppert continued to occasionally contribute to the Collapse Network news desk.

== Musical projects ==
After leaving CollapseNet, Ruppert moved to Crestone, Colorado, and pursued Native American and indigenous teachings (adopting the name "Tracker of Truth") and started putting more time into music, recording with the band New White Trash, described as a "downtempo acoustic rock outfit".

=== New White Trash ===
New White Trash was a downtempo acoustic rock band. Michael Ruppert was a founding member, along with singer Kristen Vigard, drummer Andy Kravitz, and guitarist Doug Lewis. The band released two albums, Doublewide (2011) and Age of Authority (2013). Following Ruppert's suicide in 2014, the band announced its intention to release a tribute album. Beyond the Rubicon was released on December 11, 2014.

== Media coverage and criticism ==
Numerous documentary films have featured Ruppert, including The End of Suburbia (2004), Liberty Bound (2004), American Drug War: The Last White Hope (2007), The 911 Report You Never Saw - The Great Conspiracy (2008), Collapse (2009), Zeitgeist: Moving Forward (2011), and Apocalypse, Man (2014).

Ruppert was termed a "conspiracy theorist", to which he has said he "deals with 'conspiracy fact' rather than theory". According to The Wall Street Journal, his book Crossing the Rubicon was a "favorite among conspiracy theorists." After writing it, and subsequently moving on to peak oil, he said "I walked away from 9/11 five years ago. I have nothing to do with the 9/11 truth movement."

Critic David Corn argued that Ruppert occasionally veered off into making unsubstantiated conspiracy theory claims and has criticized Ruppert's methodology, dismissing the idea that conspiracy theorizing is useful: "In fact, out-there conspiracy theorizing serves the interests of the powers-that-be by making their real transgressions seem tame in comparison." Ruppert responded with an open public letter to Corn stating that Corn is not able to disprove any of Ruppert's claims.

The New York Times, in its review of Collapse, wrote "the majority of his premises are verifiable, any weakness in his argument lies in inferences so terrifying that reasonable listeners may find themselves taking his advice" and that in it, Ruppert "emerges finally as an authentic human being, sympathetic even when the film that embraces him is not."

In 2014, Vice featured Ruppert in a 6-part series titled Apocalypse, Man.

== Death ==
On April 13, 2014, Ruppert was found dead at his home, in Napa County just outside the Calistoga, California city limits. Ruppert died of a single self-inflicted gunshot wound to the head. This was confirmed by close friend, property owner, and landlord Jack Martin. Martin found Ruppert's body and suicide note. According to his business partner and last attorney of record, Wesley Miller, Ruppert shot himself after taping his final broadcast of The Lifeboat Hour with friend and colleague Carolyn Baker, Ph.D.

On the subject of his own death, Ruppert said:

The question I am asked most frequently at my lectures is why I haven't been killed yet. I have two answers. First, it is not cost-effective, and the response would cause more problems than it would solve. I am not important enough to kill.

Secondly, I will not die one minute before God has decided.

— Mike Ruppert, Crossing the Rubicon

== Works ==
=== Bibliography ===
==== Books ====
- Ruppert, Michael C. (2004). Crossing the Rubicon: The Decline of the American Empire at the End of the Age of Oil. New Society Publishers. ISBN 0-86571-540-8.
- Ruppert, Michael C. (2009a). A Presidential Energy Policy: Twenty-Five Points Addressing the Siamese Twins of Energy and Money. Los Angeles: New World Digital Publishing. ISBN 978-0578021560.
- Ruppert, Michael C. (2009b). Confronting Collapse: The Crisis of Energy and Money in a Post Peak Oil World. Chelsea Green Publishing. ISBN 978-1-60358-264-3.

==== Selected articles ====
- Ruppert, Michael C. (n.d.). "C.I.A. & Drugs". From the Wilderness Publications. Archived from the original on 2015-04-18.
- Ruppert, Michael C. (March 1, 2002). "NATION editor David Corn attacks Mike Ruppert with bad information. Read Mike's reply to corn". From the Wilderness. Archived from the original on October 8, 2009.
- Ruppert, Michael C. (August 16, 2006a). "By the Light of a Burning Bridge". From the Wilderness. Archived from the original on April 10, 2015.
- Ruppert, Michael C. (November 7, 2006b). "Evolution". From the Wilderness. Archived from the original on 2006-12-11.

=== Appearances ===
- Booth, Kevin (2007). American Drug War: The Last White Hope (video). Passion River.
- Capper, Andy (2014). Apocalypse, Man—Part 1 (video). Vice. Archived from the original on 2014-10-12.
- Greene, Gregory (2004). The End of Suburbia (video). The Electric Wallpaper Co.
- Joseph, Peter (2011). Zeitgeist: Moving Forward (video). GMP LLC.
- Rose, Christine (2004). Liberty Bound (video). Christine Rose Productions.
- Smith, Chris; Ruppert, Michael (2009). Collapse (video). Bluemark Productions.
- Zwicker, Barrie (2008). The 911 Report You Never Saw - The Great Conspiracy (video).

=== New White Trash discography ===
- New White Trash (2011). Doublewide. Venice Arts Club. Archived from the original on 2015-04-26.
- New White Trash (2013). Age of Authority. Venice Arts Club. Archived from the original on 2015-05-05.
- New White Trash (2014). Beyond the Rubicon. Venice Arts Club. Archived from the original on 2015-05-05.

==== Music videos ====
- New White Trash (2011b). Realize the Lie. Venice Arts Club. Archived from the original on 2021-12-20.
- New White Trash (2012). Hello Life. Venice Arts Club.

==== Video interview ====
- Blake, Doug (2010). Michael C. Ruppert and the New White Trash. Venice Arts Club / Smartchannel.TV. Archived from the original on 2021-12-20.

== See also ==
- Counter Misinformation Team – U.S. State Department division
- John Michael Greer – American writer and druid (born 1962)
- James Howard Kunstler – American writer, social critic, blogger
- Dmitry Orlov – American engineer and writer
- Gary Webb – American investigative journalist (1955–2004)
