= Jean Laherrère =

French petroleum engineer and consultant

- Born: 30 May 1931 (age 94)
- Citizenship: French
- Education: Ecole Polytechnique, École Nationale Supérieure du Pétrole et des Moteurs
- Known for: The end of cheap oil
- Scientific career
- Fields: Petroleum engineer
- Institutions: Total S.A.

Jean H. Laherrère (born 30 May 1931) is a French petroleum engineer and consultant, best known as the co-author of an influential 1998 Scientific American article entitled The End of Cheap Oil.

== Career ==
Laherrère studied at the Ecole Polytechnique and Ecole Nationale du Pétrole in Paris and worked for 37 years with Total S.A., a French petroleum company. His work on seismic refraction surveys contributed to the discovery of Africa's largest oil field. Since retiring from Total in 1991, Laherrère has consulted worldwide on the future of exploration and production of oil and natural gas.

He is the co-founder and an active member of the Association for the Study of Peak Oil and Gas, and continues to contribute detailed analyses and projections of the future of world energy production. Laherrère is an advisor for the Oil Depletion Analysis Centre.

== Peak predictions ==
In 1998, with co-author Colin J. Campbell, Laherrere predicted that most likely "world production of conventional oil will peak during the first decade of the 21st century". While unconventional oil production from tar sands and tight oil kept growing, conventional crude oil has entered a plateau phase since 2005.

In 2003, Laherrere predicted that the combined natural gas production of Canada and the United States had peaked in 2001, and would continue to decline, falling approximately in half by 2020. He wrote: "It means that the future gas production is fairly settled for the next 30 years, except miracles!"

In 2007, Laherrere predicted that United States marketed natural gas production, including unconventional gas, had already peaked in 2001, at 20.6 tcf per year, and would continue to fall, to about 12 tcf by 2020. Instead, US marketed gas production has continued to rise through 2017, when it reached 28.8 tcf.

== See also ==
- Marion King Hubbert, and the Hubbert curve.
- Colin Campbell (geologist)
