= Kenneth S. Deffeyes =

American geologist, author and professor

- Born: 26 December 1931; Oklahoma City, Oklahoma, US
- Died: 29 November 2017 (aged 85); La Jolla, California, US
- Education: Colorado School of Mines (BS); Princeton University (PhD)
- Occupations: geologist, author, professor
- Title: Professor

Kenneth S. Deffeyes was a geologist who worked with M. King Hubbert, the creator of the Hubbert peak theory, at the Shell Oil Company research laboratory in Houston, Texas. He claimed Chickasaw ancestry.

Deffeyes made a lively personal impression. McPhee characterized him in Basin and Range (1981): "Deffeyes is a big man with a tenured waistline. His hair flies behind him like Ludwig van Beethoven. He lectures in sneakers. His voice is syllabic, elocutionary, operatic. ... His surname rhymes with 'the maze.'"

== Biography ==
Deffeyes earned a B.S. in petroleum geology from the Colorado School of Mines and a Ph.D. in geology from Princeton University, studying under F.B. van Houten.

Deffeyes Ph.D. dissertation research concerned volcanic ashfalls in Nevada that had been altered to zeolites. Not much was known about the potential uses of zeolites, so Deffeyes wrote a review paper on zeolites in sedimentary rocks. This resulted (according to both Deffeyes and John McPhee) in the founding of the natural zeolite industry. Zeolites have important uses in water purification, as catalysts in the petrochemical industry, and as molecular sieves.

He taught at Princeton from 1967 to 1998, when he transferred to professor emeritus status.

He was the author of Hubbert's Peak, published in 2001. In 2005 he published the book Beyond Oil: The View from Hubbert's Peak. On February 11, 2006 Deffeyes claimed that world oil production had peaked on December 16, 2005.

== In non-fiction ==
In John McPhee's 1981 book Basin and Range, about the origin of Basin and Range topography, Deffeyes teaches geology to McPhee and his readers by analyzing road cuts and the exposed geologic strata that resulted from the construction of Interstate highway 80. On one trip, Deffeyes picks up a piece of Triassic shale near Paterson, New Jersey to demonstrate a common geologic field test: he puts the shale in his mouth and chews it. "If it's gritty, it's a silt bed, and if it's creamy it's a shale," Deffeyes said. McPhee tries it and reports that he wouldn't "have thought to put it in coffee."

== Quotes ==
- "Crude oil is much too valuable to be burned as a fuel."
- Of world peak oil production: "There is nothing plausible that could postpone the peak until 2009. Get used to it."
- "The economists all think that if you show up at the cashier's cage with enough currency, God will put more oil in ground."

== See also ==
=== Other peak oil advocates ===
- Colin Campbell
- Jean Laherrère
- Dale Allen Pfeiffer
