= Matthew Simmons =

American businessman (1943–2010)

Matthew R. Simmons
- Born: Matthew Roy Simmons; April 7, 1943; Kaysville, Utah, U.S.
- Died: August 8, 2010 (aged 67); North Haven, Maine, U.S.
- Education: University of Utah; Harvard University
- Occupations: Investment banker, author
- Spouse: Ellen Christine Loungee
- Children: 5 daughters
- Parent(s): Roy William Simmons & Elizabeth Ellison

Matthew Roy Simmons (April 7, 1943 – August 8, 2010) was founder and chairman emeritus of Simmons & Company International, and was a prominent figure in the field of peak oil. Simmons was motivated by the 1973 energy crisis to create an investment banking firm catering to oil companies. He served as an energy adviser to U.S. President George W. Bush and was a member of the National Petroleum Council and the Council on Foreign Relations.

Simmons, who lived in Houston, Texas, died at his vacation home in North Haven, Maine, on August 8, 2010, at the age of 67. The death was ruled "accidental drowning with heart disease a contributing factor".

Simmons was the author of the book Twilight in the Desert, published in 2005. His examination of oil reserve decline rates helped raise awareness of the unreliability of Middle East oil reserves. He gave numerous presentations on peak oil and water shortages.

Simmons believed that the Club of Rome's report, The Limits to Growth, is more accurate than usually acknowledged.

Simmons was the founder of the Ocean Energy Institute in Maine. His vision was to make Maine a leader in energy from offshore wind and ocean forces. The Ocean Energy Institute ceased operations in 2011.

== Saudi Arabian oil reserves ==
In his book, Simmons argues that production from Saudi Arabia and especially from Ghawar—the world's largest oil field—will peak in the near future, if it has not done so already. Simmons bases his case on hundreds of internal documents from Saudi Aramco, professional journals and other authoritative sources. However, by 2016, Saudi production had increased by more than one million barrels per day.

=== Oil price wager ===
In August 2005, Simmons bet John Tierney and Rita Simon, the widow of Julian Simon, $2500 each that the price of oil averaged over the entire calendar year of 2010 would be at least $200 per barrel (in 2005 dollars). Simmons would have lost this bet by a very wide margin: 2010 average oil prices did not even reach $100. The world-wide economic collapse created demand destruction that greatly decreased the demand for oil, causing prices to fall.

== Appearances and interviews ==
Simmons made contributions to the films Peak Oil – Imposed by Nature, The Power of Community: How Cuba Survived Peak Oil (2006), The End of Suburbia, Crude Impact, and Crude Awakening: The Oil Crash, and appeared on World Energy Television World Energy Video Interview, August 2008

=== Deepwater Horizon oil spill conjectures ===
Simmons made several controversial comments and predictions regarding the Deepwater Horizon oil spill and BP's solvency, including:

- Talking with Bloomberg TV's Mark Crumpton, Lizzie O'Leary and Julie Hyman about BP's oil leak in the Gulf of Mexico, Simmons said, "If it were my family I'd evacuate now, while you still have time".
- During a June 9, 2010, interview with Fortune, Simmons claimed that BP would "have about a month before they claim Chapter 11".
- On June 9, 2010, Simmons was interviewed by Barron's journalist Tieman Ray. Simmons disclosed that he personally held an 8,000 share short position in BP stock. As BP's stock price went lower, Simmons was benefiting financially amid fears of bankruptcy.
- During a July 7, 2010, interview on CNBC Simmons claimed that scientists were reporting the flow rate from the oil spill was "spewing 120,000 barrels a day into the Gulf" and that there have been estimates that we have "lost oxygen for 40% of the Gulf of Mexico". He further claimed that the relief wells will not stop the oil spill.
- A week later, during a July 15, 2010 interview with KPFK – Pacifica Los Angeles, Simmons asserted that the relief wells and the capping process on the Macondo wellhead are publicity stunts and that the real vent is up to ten miles (16 km) away. He said that an enormous pool of crude oil is accumulating below the sea floor, releasing poisonous gases and waiting to be whipped up by a hurricane.
- Previously, on May 26, 2010, Matthew Simmons was a guest on 'The Dylan Ratigan Show' on MSNBC, where he explained his reasons for believing that the Deepwater Horizon oil spill involved not only the leak being monitored by BP's video-camera-equipped ROVs remotely operated vehicles, but another, much bigger leak, several miles away.

SIMMONS: ...when you look at the riser [on the live BP video], you realize that you're looking at a twenty-one-and-a-half inch circumference riser, and there looks like somewhere between a six and seven inch rip on the top. So the stuff coming out – it looks like a lot, but I actually saw a white fish go through it and come out white. So I said, this isn't the same as this brown, gooey, orange stuff that they found in the plume seven miles (11 km) away. And I still believe that what happened is that the riser blew off the wellhead, and it's hooked onto the rig; so you've got a mile of oil inside that that's pretty light concentrate. So that's what they're actually trying to get out. So it's not sure that – luckily they placed the top kill correctly. But now they have to see if it will take mud. It probably will take mud. But then they shouldn't delude themselves that they've stopped the spill; they should now go and say, 'Let's figure out what the plume was all about,' because if THAT'S the hole, and the casing blew out, we have an enormous problem.

RATIGAN: ...so you're saying that the video we're all now looking at right now is not the only leak, is that what you're saying?

SIMMONS: That's a tiny leak, and what the scientists are saying watching this stain spread – it's now bigger, I gather, than Maryland and Delaware, and several hundred feet thick, and it's gooey stuff – that's NOT coming out of there; they think that it's flowing at 120,000 barrels a day. It would almost have to be that big to flow that wide.

RATIGAN: And where do you believe the second outlet is relative to what we're seeing on the video, Matt?

SIMMONS: What the research vessel found a week ago Sunday [referring to news reports of May 16, 2010] was this giant plume about six miles (10 km) away, and then this huge layer of goo on the ocean floor... that's almost certain – I mean, maybe it's a natural fracture – I think that's where the wellhead is.

== Wikileaks cable mention ==
The Guardian reported that Simmons was mentioned in a leaked U.S State Department cable dated November 2007:

COMMENT: While al-Husseini believes that Saudi officials overstate capabilities in the interest of spurring foreign investment, he is also critical of international expectations. He stated that the IEA's expectation that Saudi Arabia and the Middle East will lead the market in reaching global output levels of over 100 million barrels/day is unrealistic, and it is incumbent upon political leaders to begin understanding and preparing for this "inconvenient truth." Al-Husseini was clear to add that he does not view himself as part of the "peak oil camp," and does not agree with analysts such as Matthew Simmons. He considers himself optimistic about the future of energy, but pragmatic with regards to what resources are available and what level of production is possible. While he fundamentally contradicts the Aramco company line, al-Husseini is no doomsday theorist. His pedigree, experience and outlook demand that his predictions be thoughtfully considered.

== Death ==
Simmons was found dead on August 8, 2010, in his hot tub. An autopsy by the state medical examiner's office the next day concluded that he died from accidental drowning with heart disease as a contributing factor.

== See also ==
- Richard Heinberg
- Jeremy Leggett
- Dale Allen Pfeiffer
- Peak oil
- Simmons–Tierney bet
- Cornucopian
