= 2000s energy crisis =

Sixfold rise in oil prices, peaking in 2008

2000s oil crisis
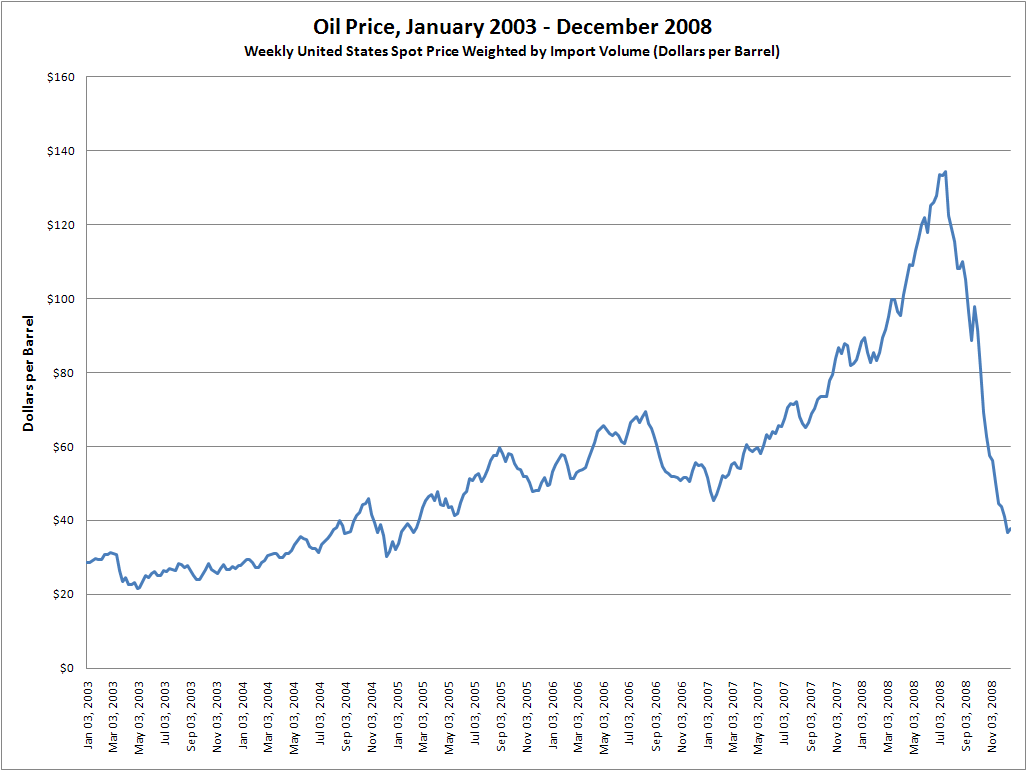
- Medium term crude oil prices Jan. 2003 – Nov. 2008, (not adjusted for inflation)
- Date: 2003–2008
- Also known as: Third oil crisis

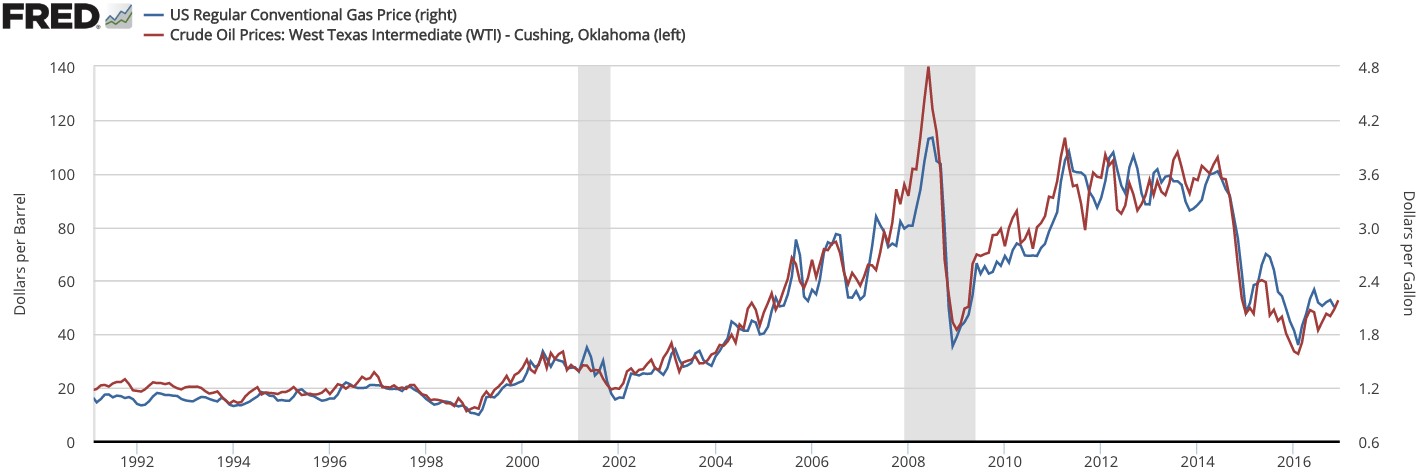
Crude oil prices to gas prices

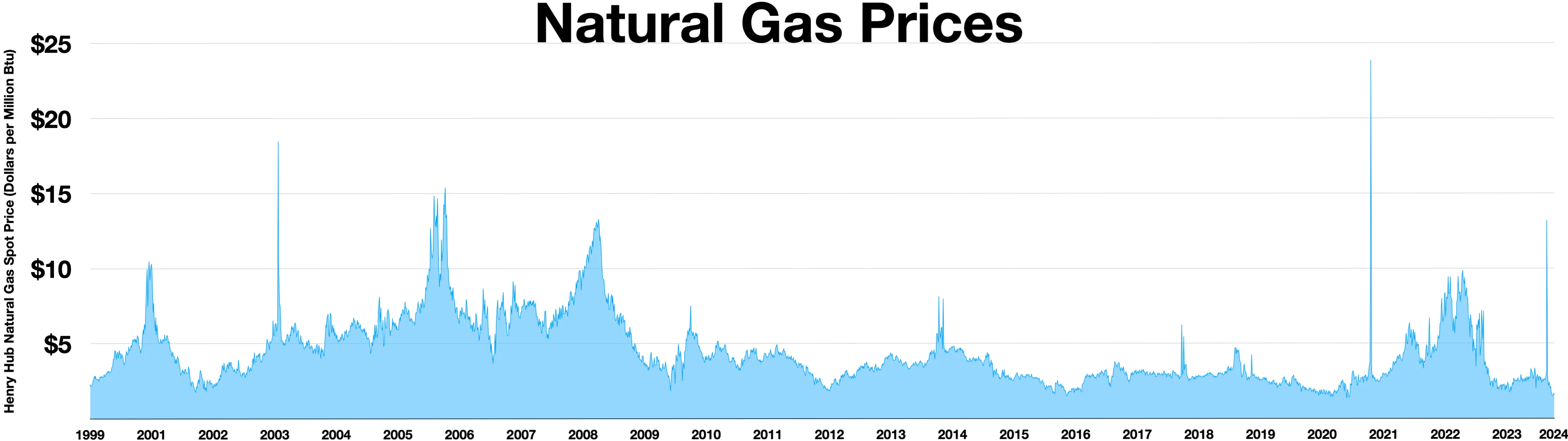
Henry Hub natural gas prices

From the mid-1980s to September 2003, the inflation-adjusted price of a barrel of crude oil on NYMEX was generally under US$25/barrel in 2008 dollars. During 2003, the price rose above $30, reached $60 by 11 August 2005, and peaked at $147.30 in July 2008. Commentators attributed these price increases to multiple factors, including Middle East tension, soaring demand from China, the falling value of the U.S. dollar, reports showing a decline in petroleum reserves, worries over peak oil, and financial speculation.

For a time, geopolitical events and natural disasters had strong short-term effects on oil prices, such as North Korean missile tests, the 2006 conflict between Israel and Lebanon, worries over Iranian nuclear plans in 2006, Hurricane Katrina, and various other factors. By 2008, such pressures appeared to have an insignificant impact on oil prices given the onset of the global recession. The recession caused demand for energy to shrink in late 2008, with oil prices collapsing from the July 2008 high of $147 to a December 2008 low of $32. However, it has been disputed that the laws of supply and demand of oil could have been responsible for an almost 80% drop in the oil price within a six-month period. Oil prices stabilized by August 2009 and generally remained in a broad trading range between $70 and $120 through November 2014, before returning to 2003 pre-crisis levels by early 2016, as US production increased dramatically. The United States went on to become the largest oil producer by 2018.

== New inflation-adjusted peaks ==
The price of crude oil in 2003 traded in a range between $20–$30/bbl. Between 2003 and July 2008, prices steadily rose, reaching $100/bbl in late 2007, coming close to the previous inflation-adjusted peak set in 1980. A steep rise in the price of oil in 2008 – also mirrored by other commodities – culminated in an all-time high of $147.27 during trading on 11 July 2008, more than a third above the previous inflation-adjusted high.

High oil prices and economic weakness contributed to a demand contraction in 2007–2008. In the United States, gasoline consumption declined by 0.4% in 2007, then fell by 0.5% in the first two months of 2008 alone. Record-setting oil prices in the first half of 2008 and economic weakness in the second half of the year prompted a 1.2 Mbbl (190,000 m^{3})/day contraction in US consumption of petroleum products, representing 5.8% of total US consumption, the largest annual decline since 1980 at the climax of the 1979 energy crisis.

== Possible causes ==
Oil price trend, 1861–2007, both nominal and adjusted to inflation

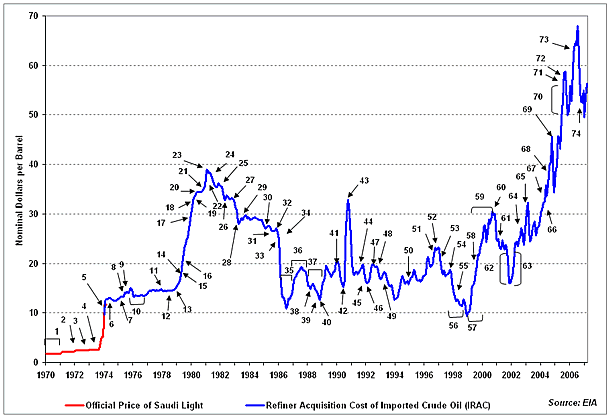
Detailed analysis of changes in oil price from 1970–2007. The graph is based on the nominal, not real, price of oil.

=== Demand ===
World crude oil demand grew an average of 1.76% per year from 1994 to 2006, with a high of 3.4% in 2003–2004. World demand for oil is projected to increase 37% over 2006 levels by 2030, according to the 2007 U.S. Energy Information Administration's (EIA) annual report. In 2007, the EIA expected demand to reach an ultimate high of 118 million barrels per day (18.8×10^{6} m^{3}/d), from 2006's 86 million barrels (13.7×10^{6} m^{3}), driven in large part by the transportation sector. A 2008 report from the International Energy Agency (IEA) predicted that although drops in petroleum demand due to high prices have been observed in developed countries and are expected to continue, a 3.7 percent rise in demand by 2013 is predicted in developing countries. This is projected to cause a net rise in global petroleum demand during that period.

Transportation consumes the largest proportion of energy, and has seen the largest growth in demand in recent decades. This growth has largely come from new demand for cars and other personal-use vehicles powered by internal combustion engines. This sector also has the highest consumption rates, accounting for approximately 55% of oil use worldwide as documented in the Hirsch report and 68.9% of the oil used in the United States in 2006. Cars and trucks are predicted to cause almost 75% of the increase in oil consumption by India and China between 2001 and 2025. In 2008, auto sales in China were expected to grow by as much as 15–20 percent, resulting in part from economic growth rates of over 10 percent for five years in a row.

Demand growth is highest in the developing world, but the United States is the world's largest consumer of petroleum. Between 1995 and 2005, US consumption grew from 17.7 million barrels (2,810,000 m^{3}) a day to 20.7 million barrels (3,290,000 m^{3}) a day, an increase of 3 million barrels (480,000 m^{3}) a day. China, by comparison, increased consumption from 3.4 million barrels (540,000 m^{3}) a day to 7 million barrels (1,100,000 m^{3}) a day, an increase of 3.6 million barrels (570,000 m^{3}) a day, in the same time frame. Per capita, annual consumption is 24.85 barrels (3.951 m^{3}) by people in the US, 1.79 barrels (0.285 m^{3}) in China, and 0.79 barrels (0.126 m^{3}) in India.

As countries develop, industry, rapid urbanization and higher living standards drive up energy use, most often of oil. Thriving economies such as China and India are quickly becoming large oil consumers. China has seen oil consumption grow by 8% yearly since 2002, doubling from 1996–2006.

Although swift continued growth in China is often predicted, others predict that China's export-dominated economy will not continue such growth trends due to wage and price inflation and reduced demand from the US. India's oil imports are expected to more than triple from 2005 levels by 2020, rising to 5 million barrels per day (790×10^{3} m^{3}/d).

Another large factor on petroleum demand has been human population growth. Because world population grew faster than oil production, production per capita peaked in 1979 (preceded by a plateau during the period of 1973–1979). The world’s population in 2030 is expected to be double that of 1980.

==== Role of fuel subsidies ====
State fuel subsidies shielded consumers in multiple nations from higher market prices, but a number of these subsidies were reduced or removed as the governmental cost rose.

In June 2008, AFP reported that:

China became the latest Asian nation to curb energy subsidies last week after hiking retail petrol and diesel prices as much as 18 percent... Elsewhere in Asia, Malaysia has hiked fuel prices by 41 percent and Indonesia by around 29 percent, while Taiwan and India have also raised their energy costs.

In the same month, Reuters reported that:

Countries like China and India, along with Gulf nations whose retail oil prices are kept below global prices, contributed 61 percent of the increase in global consumption of crude oil from 2000 to 2006, according to JPMorgan.

Other than Japan, Hong Kong, Singapore and South Korea, most Asian nations subsidize domestic fuel prices. The more countries subsidize them, the less likely high oil prices will have any affect [sic] in reducing overall demand, forcing governments in weaker financial situations to surrender first and stop their subsidies.

That is what happened over the past two weeks. Indonesia, Taiwan, Sri Lanka, Bangladesh, India, and Malaysia have either raised regulated fuel prices or pledged that they will.

The Economist reported: "Half of the world's population enjoys fuel subsidies. This estimate, from Morgan Stanley, implies that almost a quarter of the world's petrol is sold at less than the market price." U.S. Secretary of Energy Samuel Bodman stated that around 30 million barrels per day (4,800,000 m^{3}/d) of oil consumption (over a third of the global total) was subsidized.

=== Supply ===
An important contributor to the price increase was the slowdown in oil supply growth, which has been a general trend since oil production surpassed new discoveries in 1980. The likelihood that global oil production will decline at some point, leading to lower supply, is a long-term fundamental cause of rising prices. Although there is contention about the exact time at which global production will peak, a majority of industry participants acknowledge that the concept of a production peak is valid. However, some commentators argued that global warming awareness and new energy sources would limit demand before the effects of supply could, suggesting that reserve depletion would be a non-issue.

A large factor in the lower supply growth of petroleum has been that oil's historically high ratio of Energy Returned on Energy Invested is in significant decline. Petroleum is a limited resource, and the remaining accessible reserves are consumed more rapidly each year. Remaining reserves are increasingly difficult to extract and therefore more expensive. Eventually, reserves will only be economically feasible to extract at extremely high prices. Even if total oil supply does not decline, increasing numbers of experts believe the easily accessible sources of light sweet crude are almost exhausted and in the future the world will depend on more-expensive unconventional oil reserves and heavy crude oil, as well as renewable energy sources. It is thought by a number of people, including energy economists such as Matthew Simmons, that prices could continue to rise indefinitely until a new market equilibrium is reached at which point supply satisfies worldwide demand.

Timothy Kailing, in a 2008 Journal of Energy Security article, pointed out the difficulty of increasing production in mature petroleum regions, even with vastly increased investment in exploration and production. By looking at the historical response of production to variation in drilling effort, he claimed that very little increase of production could be attributed to increased drilling. This was due to a tight quantitative relationship of diminishing returns with increasing drilling effort: As drilling effort increased, the energy obtained per active drill rig was reduced according to a severely diminishing power law. This analysis suggested that even an enormous increase of drilling effort was unlikely to lead to significantly increased oil and gas production in a mature petroleum region like the United States.

A prominent example of investment in non-conventional sources is seen in the Canadian oil sands. They are a far less cost-efficient source of heavy, low-grade oil than conventional crude; but when oil trades above $60/bbl, the tar sands become attractive to exploration and production companies. While Canada's oil sands region is estimated to contain as much "heavy" oil as all the world's reserves of "conventional" oil, efforts to economically exploit these resources lag behind the increasing demand of recent years.

Until 2008, CERA (a consulting company wholly owned by energy consultants IHS Energy) did not believe this would be such an immediate problem. However, in an interview with The Wall Street Journal, Daniel Yergin, previously known for his quotes that the price of oil would soon return down to "normal", amended the company's position on 7 May 2008 to predict that oil would reach $150 during 2008, due to tightness of supply. This reversal of opinion was significant, as CERA, among other consultancies, provided price projections that were used by multiple official bodies to plan long-term strategy in respect of energy mix and price.

Other major energy organisations, such as the International Energy Agency (IEA), had already been much less optimistic in their assessments for some time. In 2008, the IEA drastically accelerated its prediction of production decline for existing oilfields, from 3.7% a year to 6.7% a year, based largely on better accounting methods, including actual research of individual oil field production throughout the world.

Terrorist and insurgent groups have increasingly targeted oil and gas installations, and succeeded in stopping a substantial volume of exports during the 2003–2008 height of the American occupation of Iraq. Such attacks are sometimes perpetrated by militias in regions where oil wealth has produced few tangible benefits for the local citizenry, as is the case in the Niger Delta.

A number of factors have resulted in possible and/or actual concerns about the reduced supply of oil. The post-9/11 war on terror, labor strikes, hurricane threats to oil platforms, fires and terrorist threats at refineries, and other short-lived problems are not solely responsible for the higher prices. Such problems do push prices higher temporarily, but have not historically been fundamental to long-term price increases.

=== Investment/speculation demand ===
Investment demand for oil occurs when investors purchase futures contracts to buy a commodity at a set price for future delivery. "Speculators are not buying any actual crude. ... When [the] contracts mature, they either settle them with a cash payment or sell them on to genuine consumers."

Several claims have been made implicating financial speculation as a major cause of the price increases. In May 2008 the transport chief for Germany's Social Democrats estimated that 25 percent of the rise to $135 a barrel had nothing to do with underlying supply and demand. Testimony was given to a U.S. Senate committee in May indicating that "demand shock" from "institutional investors" had increased by 848 million barrels (134,800,000 m^{3}) over the previous five years, almost as much as the increased physical demand from China (920 million barrels (146,000,000 m^{3})). The influence of institutional investors, such as sovereign wealth funds, was also discussed in June 2008, when Lehman Brothers suggested that price increases were related to increases in exposure to commodities by such investors. It claimed that "for every $100 million in new inflows, the price of West Texas Intermediate, the U.S. benchmark, increased by 1.6%." Also in May 2008, an article in The Economist pointed out that oil futures transactions on the New York Mercantile Exchange (NYMEX), nearly mirrored the price of oil increases for a several-year period; however, the article conceded that the increased investment might be following rising prices, rather than causing them, and that the nickel market value had halved in the year between May 2007 and May 2008 despite significant speculative interest. It also reminded readers that "Investment can flood into the oil market without driving up prices because speculators are not buying any actual crude... no oil is hoarded or somehow kept off the market," and that prices of some commodities which are not openly traded have actually risen faster than oil prices. In June 2008, OPEC's Secretary General Abdallah Salem el-Badri stated that current world consumption of oil at 87 million bpd was far exceeded by the "paper market" for oil, which equaled about 1.36 billion bpd, or more than 15 times the actual market demand.

An interagency task force on commodities markets was formed in the U.S. government to investigate the claims of speculators' influence on the petroleum market. The task force concluded in July 2008 that "market fundamentals" such as supply and demand provided the best explanations for oil price increases, and that increased speculation was not statistically correlated with the increases. The report also noted that increased prices with an elastic supply would cause increases in petroleum inventories. As inventories actually declined, the task force concluded that market pressures were most likely to blame. Other commodities that were not subject to market speculation (such as coal, steel, and onions) saw similar price increases over the same time period.

In June 2008 U.S. energy secretary Samuel Bodman said that insufficient oil production, not financial speculation, was driving rising crude prices. He said that oil production had not kept pace with growing demand. "In the absence of any additional crude supply, for every 1% of crude demand, we will expect a 20% increase in price in order to balance the market," Bodman said. This contradicted earlier statements by Iranian OPEC governor Mohammad-Ali Khatibi indicating that the oil market was saturated and that an increase in production announced by Saudi Arabia was "wrong".

In September 2008, Masters Capital Management released a study of the oil market, concluding that speculation did significantly impact the price. The study stated that over $60 billion was invested in oil during the first six months of 2008, helping drive the price per barrel from $95 to $147, and that by the beginning of September, $39 billion had been withdrawn by speculators, causing prices to fall.

== Effects ==
There is debate over what the effects of the 2000s energy crisis will be over the long term. Some speculated that an oil-price spike could create a recession comparable to those that followed the 1973 and 1979 energy crises or a potentially worse situation such as a global oil crash. Increased petroleum prices are reflected in a vast number of products derived from petroleum, as well as those transported using petroleum fuels.

Political scientist George Friedman has postulated that if high prices for oil and food persist, they will define the fourth distinct geopolitical regime since the end of World War II, the previous three being the Cold War, the 1989–2001 period in which economic globalization was primary, and the post-9/11 "war on terror".

In addition to high oil prices, from year 2000 volatility in the price of oil has increased notably and this volatility has been suggested to be a cause of the 2008 financial crisis.

The perceived increase in oil price differs internationally according to currency market fluctuations and the purchasing power of currencies. For example, excluding changes in relative purchasing power of various currencies, from 1 January 2002 to 1 January 2008:

- In US$, oil price rose from $20.37 to nearly $100, about 4.91 times as expensive;
- In the same period, the Taiwanese dollar gained value over the U.S. dollar to make oil in Taiwan 4.53 times as expensive;
- In the same period, the Japanese Yen gained value over the U.S. dollar to make oil in Japan 4.10 times as expensive;
- In the same period, the Euro gained value over the U.S. dollar to make oil in the Eurozone 2.94 times as expensive.

On average, oil prices roughly quadrupled for these areas, triggering widespread protest activities. A similar price surge for petroleum-based fertilizers contributed to the 2007–08 world food price crisis and further unrest.

In 2008, a report by Cambridge Energy Research Associates stated that 2007 had been the year of peak gasoline usage in the United States, and that record energy prices would cause an "enduring shift" in energy consumption practices. According to the report, in April gas consumption had been lower than a year before for the sixth straight month, suggesting 2008 would be the first year U.S. gasoline usage declined in 17 years. The total miles driven in the U.S. began declining in 2006.

In the United States, oil prices contributed to inflation averaging 3.3% in 2005–2006, significantly above the average of 2.5% in the preceding 10-year period. As a result, during this period the Federal Reserve steadily raised interest rates to curb inflation.

High oil prices typically affect less-affluent countries first, particularly the developing world with less discretionary income. There are fewer vehicles per capita, and oil is often used for electricity generation as well as private transport. The World Bank has looked more deeply at the effect of oil prices in the developing countries. One analysis found that in South Africa a 125 percent increase in the price of crude oil and refined petroleum reduces employment and GDP by approximately 2 percent, and reduces household consumption by approximately 7 percent, affecting mainly the poor.

OPEC's annual oil export revenue surged to a new record in 2008, estimated around US$800 billion.

== Forecasted prices and trends ==
According to informed observers, OPEC, meeting in early December 2007, seemed to desire a high but stable price that would deliver substantial needed income to the oil-producing states, but avoid prices so high that they would negatively impact the economies of the oil-consuming nations. A range of US$70–80 per barrel was suggested by some analysts to be OPEC's goal.

In November 2008, as prices fell below $60 a barrel, the IEA warned that falling prices could lead to both a lack of investment in new sources of oil and a fall in production of more-expensive unconventional reserves such as the oil sands of Canada. The IEA's chief economist warned, "Oil supplies in the future will come more and more from smaller and more-difficult fields," meaning that future production requires more investment every year. A lack of new investment in such projects, which had already been observed, could eventually cause new and more-severe supply issues than had been experienced in the early 2000s according to the IEA. Because the sharpest production declines had been seen in developed countries, the IEA warned that the greatest growth in production was expected to come from smaller projects in OPEC states, raising their world production share from 44% in 2008 to a projected 51% in 2030. The IEA also pointed out that demand from the developed world may have also peaked, so that future demand growth was likely to come from developing nations such as China, contributing 43%, and India and the Middle East, each about 20%.

== End of the crisis ==
By the beginning of September 2008, prices had fallen to $110. OPEC Secretary General El-Badri said that the organization intended to cut output by about 500,000 barrels (79,000 m^{3}) a day, which he saw as correcting a "huge oversupply" due to declining economies and a stronger U.S. dollar. On 10 September, the International Energy Agency (IEA) lowered its 2009 demand forecast by 140,000 barrels (22,000 m^{3}) to 87.6 million barrels (13,930,000 m^{3}) a day.

As countries throughout the world entered an economic recession in the third quarter of 2008 and the global banking system came under severe strain, oil prices continued to slide. In November and December, global demand growth fell, and U.S. oil demand fell an estimated 10% overall from early October to early November 2008 (accompanying a significant drop in auto sales).

In their December meeting, OPEC members agreed to reduce their production by 2.2 million barrels (350,000 m^{3}) per day, and said their resolution to reduce production in October had an 85% compliance rate.

Petroleum prices fell below $35 in February 2009, but by May 2009 had risen back to mid-November 2008 levels around $55. The global economic downturn left oil-storage facilities with more oil than in any year since 1990, when Iraq's invasion of Kuwait upset the market.

In early 2011, crude oil rebounded above US$100/bbl due to the Arab Spring protests in the Middle East and North Africa, including the 2011 Egyptian revolution, the 2011 Libyan civil war, and steadily tightening international sanctions against Iran. The oil price fluctuated around $100 through early 2014.

By 2014–2015, the world oil market was again steadily oversupplied, led by an unexpected near-doubling in U.S. oil production from 2008 levels due to substantial improvements in shale "fracking" technology. By January 2016, the OPEC Reference Basket fell to US$22.48/bbl – less than one-sixth of its record from July 2008 ($140.73), and back below the April 2003 starting point ($23.27) of its historic run-up. OPEC production was poised to rise further with the lifting of Iranian sanctions, at a time when markets already appeared to be oversupplied by at least 2 million barrels per day.

== Possible mitigations ==
Attempts to mitigate the impacts of oil price increases include:

- Increasing the supply of petroleum
- Finding substitutes for petroleum
- Decreasing the demand for petroleum
- Attempting to reduce the impact of rising prices on petroleum consumers
- Better urban planning with more emphasis on bike lanes, public transit, and high dense residential zoning.

In mainstream economic theory, a free market rations an increasingly scarce commodity by increasing its price. A higher price should stimulate producers to produce more, and consumers to consume less, while possibly shifting to substitutes. The first three mitigation strategies in the above list are, therefore, in keeping with mainstream economic theory, as government policies can affect the supply and demand for petroleum as well as the availability of substitutes. In contrast, the last type of strategy in the list (attempting to shield consumers from rising prices) would seem to work against classical economic theory, by encouraging consumers to overconsume the scarce quantity, thus making it even scarcer. To avoid creating outright shortages, attempts at price control may require some sort of rationing scheme.

=== Alternative propulsion ===
==== Alternative fuels ====
Economists say that the substitution effect will spur demand for alternate fossil fuels, such as coal or liquefied natural gas and for renewable energy, such as solar power, wind power, and advanced biofuels.

For example, China and India are currently heavily investing in natural gas and coal liquefaction facilities. Nigeria is working on burning natural gas to produce electricity instead of simply flaring the gas, where all non-emergency gas flaring will be forbidden after 2008. Outside the U.S., more than 50% of oil is consumed for stationary, non-transportation purposes such as electricity production where it is relatively easy to substitute natural gas for oil.

Oil companies including the supermajors have begun to fund research into alternative fuel. BP has invested half a billion dollars for research over the next several years. The motivations behind such moves are to acquire the patent rights as well as understanding the technology so vertical integration of the future industry could be achieved.

==== Electric propulsion ====
The rise in oil prices caused renewed interest in electric cars, with several new models hitting the market, both hybrid and purely electric. The most successful among the former being the Toyota Prius and among the latter the cars of companies like Tesla. Several countries also incentivized the use of electric cars through tax-breaks or subsidies or by building charging stations.

==== High speed rail ====
In a similar vein as the original TGV that was switched from gas turbine to electric propulsion after the 1973 oil crisis, several countries have renewed and increased their efforts for electric propulsion in their rail systems, specifically high-speed rail. In the time since 2003, the global High speed rail network almost doubled and there are plans globally that amount to the network being doubled again within the next ten to twenty years, based on current constructions. China in particular went from having no high-speed rail whatsoever in 2003 to having the longest network in the world in 2015.

=== Bioplastics and bioasphalt ===
Another major factor in petroleum demand is the widespread use of petroleum products such as plastic. These could be partially replaced by bioplastics, which are derived from renewable plant feedstocks such as vegetable oil, cornstarch, pea starch, or microbiota. They are used either as a direct replacement for traditional plastics or as blends with traditional plastics. The most common end use market is for packaging materials. Japan has also been a pioneer in bioplastics, incorporating them into electronics and automobiles.

Bioasphalt can also be used as a replacement of petroleum asphalt.

=== United States Strategic Fuel Reserve ===
The United States Strategic Petroleum Reserve could, on its own, supply current U.S. demand for about a month in the event of an emergency, unless it were also destroyed or inaccessible in the emergency. This could potentially be the case if a major storm were to hit the Gulf of Mexico, where the reserve is located. While total consumption has increased, the western economies are less reliant on oil than they were twenty-five years ago, due both to substantial growth in productivity and the growth of sectors of the economy with little oil dependence such as finance and banking, retail, etc. The decline of heavy industry and manufacturing in most developed countries has reduced the amount of oil per unit GDP; however, since these items are imported anyway, there is less change in the oil dependence of industrialized countries than the direct consumption statistics indicate.

=== Fuel taxes ===
One recourse used and discussed in the past to avoid the negative impacts of oil shocks in the a number of developed countries which have high fuel taxes has been to temporarily or permanently suspend these taxes as fuel costs rise.

France, Italy, and the Netherlands lowered taxes in 2000 in response to protests over high prices, but other European nations resisted this option because public service finance is partly based on energy taxes. The issue came up again in 2004, when oil reached $40 a barrel causing a meeting of 25 EU finance ministers to lower economic growth forecasts for that year. Because of budget deficits in several countries, they decided to pressure OPEC to lower prices instead of lowering taxes. In 2007, European truckers, farmers, and fishermen again raised concerns over record oil prices cutting into their earnings, hoping to have taxes lowered. In the United Kingdom, where fuel taxes were raised in October and were scheduled to rise again in April 2008, there was talk of protests and roadblocks if the tax issue was not addressed. On 1 April 2008, a 25 yen per liter fuel tax in Japan was allowed to lapse temporarily.

This method of softening price shocks is even less viable to countries with much lower gas taxes, such as the United States.

Locally decreasing fuel tax can decrease fuel prices, but globally prices are set by supply and demand, and therefore fuel tax decreases may have no effect on fuel prices, and fuel tax increases might actually decrease fuel prices by reducing demand. But this depends on the price elasticity of demand for fuel which is -0.09 to -0.31, meaning that fuel is a relatively inelastic commodity, i.e. increasing or decreasing prices have overall only a small effect on demand and therefore price change.

=== Demand management ===
Transportation demand management has the potential to be an effective policy response to fuel shortages or price increases and has a greater probability of long term benefits than other mitigation options.

There are major differences in energy consumption for private transport between cities; an average U.S. urban dweller uses 24 times more energy annually for private transport as a Chinese urban resident. These differences cannot be explained by wealth alone but are closely linked to the rates of walking, cycling, and public transport use and to enduring features of the city including urban density and urban design.

For individuals, remote work provides alternatives to daily commuting and long-distance air travel for business. Technologies such as videoconferencing, e-mail, and corporate wikis, continue to improve. As the cost of moving human workers continues to rise, while the cost of moving information electronically continues to fall, presumably market forces should cause more people to substitute virtual travel for physical travel. Matthew Simmons explicitly calls for "liberating the workforce" by changing the corporate mindset from paying people to show up physically to work every day, to paying them instead for the work they do, from any location. This would allow more information workers to work from home either part-time or full-time, or from satellite offices or Internet cafes near to where they live, freeing them from long daily commutes to central offices. However, even full adoption of remote work by all eligible workers might only decrease energy consumption by about 1% (with present energy savings estimated at 0.01–0.04%). By comparison, a 20% increase in automobile fuel economy would save 5.4%.

=== Political action against market speculation ===
The price rises of mid-2008 led to a variety of proposals to change the rules governing energy markets and energy futures markets, in order to prevent rises due to market speculation.

On 26 July 2008, the United States House of Representatives passed the Energy Markets Emergency Act of 2008 (H.R. 6377), which directs the Commodity Futures Trading Commission (CFTC) "to utilize all its authority, including its emergency powers, to curb immediately the role of excessive speculation in any contract market within the jurisdiction and control of the Commodity Futures Trading Commission, on or through which energy futures or swaps are traded, and to eliminate excessive speculation, price distortion, sudden or unreasonable fluctuations or unwarranted changes in prices, or other unlawful activity causing major market disturbances that prevent the market from accurately reflecting the forces of supply and demand for energy commodities."

== See also ==
- 2000s commodities boom
- 2020s commodities boom
- 1970s commodities boom
- Global energy crisis (2021–2023)
- 1970s energy crisis
