= The Prize: The Epic Quest for Oil, Money, and Power =

1990 book by Daniel Yergin

- Hardcover
- Author: Daniel Yergin
- Language: English
- Subject: History
- Genre: Nonfiction
- Publisher: Simon & Schuster
- Publication date: December 1990
- Publication place: United States
- Pages: 912
- ISBN: 0-671-50248-4 (hardcover); 0-671-79932-0 (paperback)
- Dewey Decimal: 338.2/7282/0904 20
- LC Class: HD9560.6 .Y47 1990
- Followed by: The Quest

The Prize: The Epic Quest for Oil, Money, and Power is Daniel Yergin's 1990 history of the global petroleum industry from the 1850s to 1990. The Prize became a bestseller, helped by its release date in December 1990, four months after the invasion of Kuwait ordered by Saddam Hussein and one month before the U.S.-led coalition began the Gulf War to oust Iraqi troops from that country. The book eventually went on to win a Pulitzer Prize.

An unabridged audiobook version of The Prize was released in 2024, with an epilogue narrated by its author, reflecting on the relevance of the book’s messaging, more than 30 years after its original publication date.

The Prize has been called the "definitive" history of the oil industry, even a "bible".

== Popular success ==
In 1992 The Prize won the Pulitzer Prize for General Nonfiction. It has been translated into fourteen languages. Now out of print in hardcover, The Prize was published in a paperback edition (ISBN 0-671-79932-0) that was released at the end of 1992, and is currently in print. The Prize is often cited as essential background reading for students of the history of petroleum. Prof. Joseph R. Rudolph Jr. said in Library Journal, for example:

Written by one of the foremost U.S. authorities on energy, it is a major work in the field, replete with enough insight to satisfy the scholar and sufficient concern with the drama and colorful personalities in the history of oil to capture the interest of the general public. Though lengthy, the book never drags in developing its themes: the relationship of oil to the rise of modern capitalism; the intertwining relations between oil, politics, and international power; and the relationship between oil and society in what Yergin calls today's age of "Hydrocarbon Man".

== Sources ==
Ten years in the making, The Prize draws on extensive research carried out by the author and his staff, including Sue Lena Thompson, Robert Laubacher, and Geoffrey Lumsden. Daniel Yergin and is the Chairman of a private energy consulting firm called Cambridge Energy Research Associates, a Global Energy Analyst for NBC and CNBC, a member of the board of the United States Energy Association and of the U.S.-Russia Business Council.

Yergin's history has 61 pages of notes and a bibliography of 26 pages that lists as sources 700 books, articles, and dissertations, 60 government documents, 28 "data sources", more than 34 manuscript collections, fifteen government archives, eight oral histories, and four oil company archives (Amoco, Chevron, Gulf, and Royal Dutch Shell), and 80 personal interviews with key individuals like James Schlesinger and Armand Hammer.

== Adaptations ==
In 1992–1993, The Prize was the basis for an eight-part, eight-hour documentary television series titled The Prize: The Epic Quest for Oil, Money, & Power, narrated by Donald Sutherland and broadcast by PBS.

The book is available as an abridged audiobook, released in 1991 and read by Bob Jamieson, as well as an unabridged version released in 2024 and read by Michael David Axtell.

In 2011, Yergin's The Quest: Energy, Security, and the Remaking of the Modern World was published by Penguin Press. The Quest is the sequel to The Prize.

== Origin of the title ==
The name of the book is taken from a quote by Winston Churchill in 1912, when he was First Lord of the Admiralty, long before becoming Prime Minister of the United Kingdom. He was arguing for the conversion of British warships from coal to fuel oil, but noted the geopolitical ramifications of tying Britain's fortunes to oil.

As Yergin quotes Churchill:

To build any large additional number of oil-burning ships meant basing our naval supremacy upon oil. But oil was not found in appreciable quantities in our islands. If we required it we must carry it by sea in peace or war from distant countries. We had, on the other hand, the finest supply of the best steam coal in the world, safe in our mines under our own land. To commit the Navy irrevocably to oil was indeed to "take arms against a sea of troubles." Yet, if the difficulties and risk could be surmounted, "we should be able to raise the whole power and efficiency of the Navy to a definitely higher level; better ships, better crews, higher economies, more intense forms of war power"—in a word, "mastery itself was the prize of the venture." [Emphasis added]
