= UCCI =

UCCI may refer to:

- Ucci (surname)
- Union of Ibero-American Capital Cities, a non-governmental organization of 29 cities
- Universidad Continental de Ciencias e Ingeniería, a Peruvian university in Huancayo, Junín Region
- University College of the Cayman Islands, a tertiary educational institution
- Upstream capital costs index, a proprietary index of the rate of inflation in oil and gas projects
