= S&P Global Energy =

American energy markets information provider

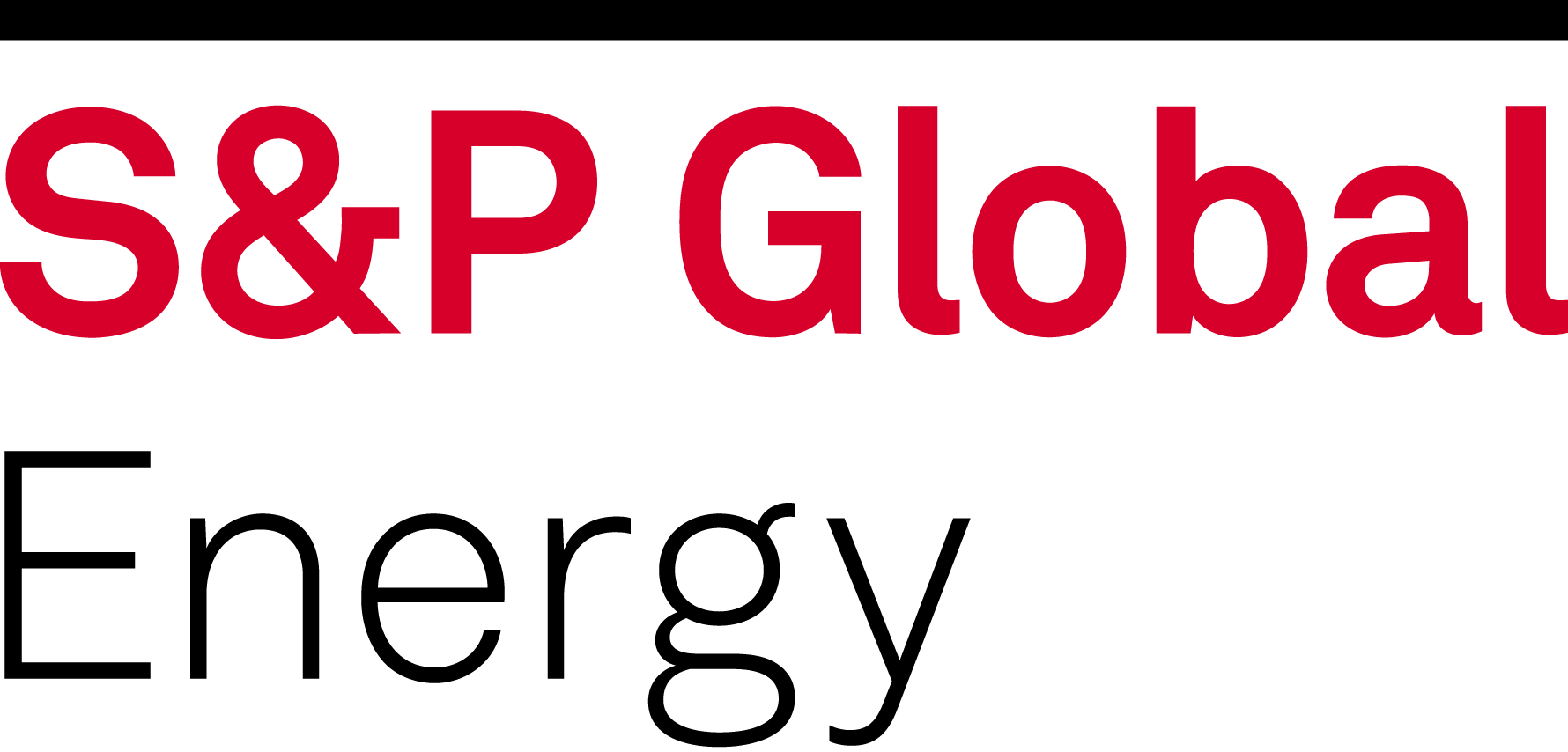
- Formerly: Platt's (1923–1953); Platts (1953–2016); S&P Global Platts (2016–2022); S&P Global Commodity Insights (2022–2025)
- Type: Division
- Industry: Commodities, Energy, Financial Information
- Founded: February 1, 1909; 117 years ago, in Cleveland, Ohio, US
- Founder: Warren C. Platt
- Headquarters: London, England, UK
- Area served: Worldwide
- Key people: Dave Ernsberger (President)
- Products: Price assessments, market data, analytics, news, research
- Services: Information and benchmark price provider
- Parent: S&P Global
- Website: www.spglobal.com/energy

S&P Global Energy is a provider of energy and commodities information and benchmark price assessments. Its editors publish daily price assessments in physical commodity markets, and the U.S. Department of Justice has identified the company as one of four global price reporting agencies. Its assessments underpin the Brent crude oil benchmark; the Oxford Institute for Energy Studies estimated in 2022 that the Brent complex priced almost 70% of globally traded crude oil and long-term LNG.

The business traces its origins to 1909, when Warren C. Platt founded the magazine National Petroleum News in Cleveland, Ohio. Platt's publishing interests became part of McGraw-Hill in 1953 and grew into the division known as Platts. It was renamed S&P Global Platts in 2016, S&P Global Commodity Insights following a 2022 merger with IHS Markit, and S&P Global Energy in November 2025.

== Overview ==
From an original focus on the oil industry, S&P Global Energy gradually expanded its purview to include metals, agriculture, shipping, and all energy-related markets – oil, coal, natural gas, electricity, nuclear power, petrochemicals, renewables, and emissions.

== Corporate history ==
Warren C. Platt (1883–1963) started the magazine National Petroleum News in Cleveland, Ohio in 1909. He expanded the business with the publication of the newsletter called Platts Oilgram in 1923, which went on to be recognized as an influential source for petroleum prices. The companies founded by Platt that published prices and news were acquired in 1953 to become part of what was then known as McGraw-Hill group, which was later to become S&P Global. The publication activities that started with petroleum later expanded to cover energy and commodities, which were all undertaken by the division that became known as Platts.

In 2000, McGraw-Hill merged Platts with other like assets to turn the company into a provider of energy information. In 2016, when McGraw-Hill changed its name to S&P Global, the Platts division was renamed S&P Global Platts.

Platts' first significant acquisition came in 2001, when it acquired FT Energy. That acquisition gave it the Platts Global Energy Awards, considered one of the industry's biggest awards event, held every December in New York.

Beginning in 2010, Platts' parent started making acquisitions to significantly grow the Platts business, including: Bentek Energy, a natural gas-focused analytics firm, in 2010; Eclipse Energy; Kingsman; Minerals Value Service; RigData in 2016 (RigData was sold to Drillinginfo in 2019); Commodity Flow in 2016; and PIRA. An attempt to acquire OPIS in 2011 failed following market objections and Federal Trade Commission resistance.

In 2022, when S&P Global completed a merger with IHS Markit, it combined the divisions S&P Global Platts and IHS Markit ENR to form the renamed S&P Global Commodity Insights, dropping Platts from the division's name, though preserving it in the ongoing Platts Global Energy Awards. Former IHS brands that were retained include CERAWeek and Chemical Week.

On November 14, 2025, S&P Global announced the rebranding of Commodity Insights to S&P Global Energy, effective immediately, to sharpen its focus on global energy intelligence amid evolving market demands.

== Benchmarks and methodology ==
=== Market on Close ===
Platts produces most of its oil price assessments, and many of those for other commodities, through a process it calls Market on Close (MOC). Its editors collect bids, offers and completed trades from market participants throughout the trading day, and publish a price that reflects the market's value at a fixed closing time. Platts stops accepting new bids and offers 30 to 45 minutes before the close; traders call this final period the "window". Editors may exclude bids and offers that cannot be verified as meeting Platts' published guidelines. When no trade takes place, they base the assessment on bids, offers and price spreads to related products. Platts first used the process in Asia in 1992.

In 2012 the International Organization of Securities Commissions (IOSCO) published Principles for Oil Price Reporting Agencies, at the request of the G20. Platts has since commissioned annual reviews of its compliance from Ernst & Young, and in 2015 extended them to its assessments for commodities other than oil.

=== Dated Brent ===
Platts began assessing Dated Brent in 1987. The Brent complex priced almost 70% of globally traded crude oil and long-term LNG in 2022, according to the Oxford Institute for Energy Studies. As production from the North Sea fields in the basket declined, Platts added deliverable grades. After Troll joined in 2018 the basket had five: Brent, Forties, Oseberg, Ekofisk and Troll. In June 2022, after a market consultation, Platts announced that the US grade WTI Midland would join the basket from June 2023 deliveries, and that the standard cargo size would rise from 600,000 to 700,000 barrels. WTI Midland first set Dated Brent on 2 May 2023, the first grade from outside the North Sea to do so.

=== Dubai and Oman ===
Platts Dubai and Platts Oman are the main price references for Middle Eastern crude oil sold to Asia. Output of Dubai crude fell from a peak of about 400,000 barrels per day in the early 1990s to under 120,000 barrels per day by 2004. Platts responded by widening what could be delivered against the benchmark. In 2001 it allowed sellers to deliver Oman crude against Dubai trades, and in 2004 it introduced the "partials" mechanism, which splits a cargo into 25,000-barrel parcels traded in the MOC process. Saudi Aramco set its official selling prices for Asia against the average of Platts Dubai and Platts Oman until October 2018, when it replaced Platts Oman with the Oman futures contract of the Dubai Mercantile Exchange.

=== Japan Korea Marker ===
Platts launched the Japan Korea Marker (JKM) in February 2009 as the first daily price assessment for liquefied natural gas cargoes traded in Asia. It reflects the spot value of cargoes delivered ex-ship to Japan, South Korea, China and Taiwan. Futures that settle against the JKM are listed on the European Energy Exchange.

== See also ==
- Foster Natural Gas/Oil Report
- Mean of Platts Singapore
- Oil & Gas Journal
- Cambridge Energy Research Associates
- CERAWeek
