= Daniel Yergin =

American business executive and author

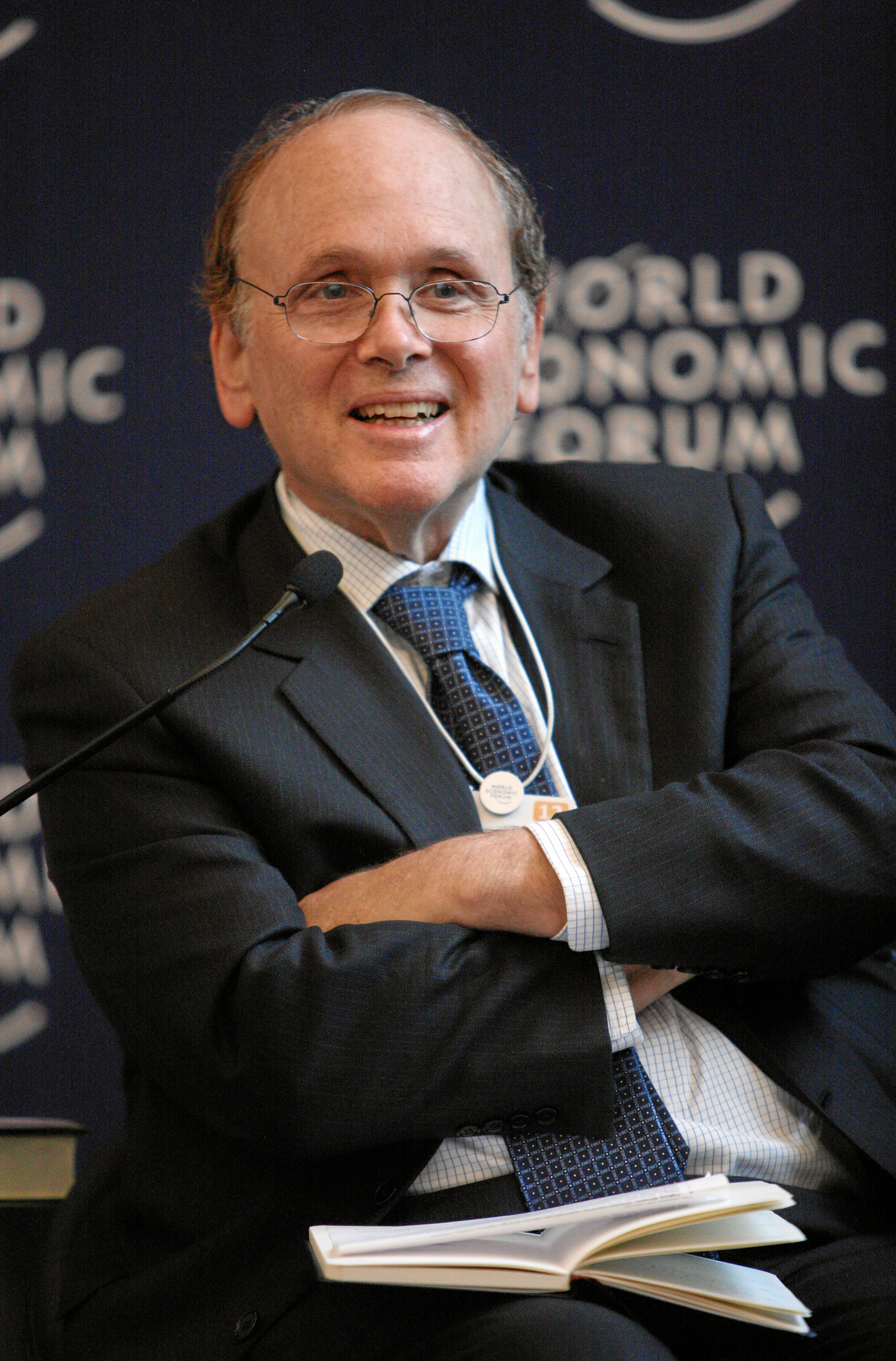
- Yergin in 2012
- Born: February 6, 1947 (age 79); Los Angeles, California, U.S.
- Education: Yale University (BA); Trinity College, Cambridge (MA, PhD)
- Occupations: Author; historian; educator; energy analyst
- Spouse: Angela Stent
- Awards: Pulitzer Prize
- Website: danielyergin.com

Daniel Howard Yergin (born February 6, 1947) is an American author, economic historian, and consultant within the energy and economic sectors. Yergin is vice chairman of S&P Global. He was formerly vice chairman of IHS Markit, which merged with S&P in 2022. He founded Cambridge Energy Research Associates, which IHS Markit acquired in 2004. He has authored or co-authored several books on energy and world economics, including the Pulitzer Prize–winning The Prize: The Epic Quest for Oil, Money, and Power, (1991) The Quest: Energy, Security, and the Remaking of the Modern World (2011), and The New Map: Energy, Climate, and the Clash of Nations (2020).

Yergin's articles and op-eds on energy, history, and the economy have been published in publications such as The Wall Street Journal, The New York Times, The Washington Post, and the Financial Times. He is affiliated with multiple organizations, as a director on the United States Energy Association, a trustee of the Brookings Institution, a long-term advisor to several U.S. administrations, as well as chairman of the annual CERAWeek energy conference.

== Early life and education ==
Yergin was born on February 6, 1947, in Los Angeles, California. His father Irving Yergin worked at Warner Brothers and was editor of The Hollywood Reporter and a former journalist in Chicago. His mother Naomi Yergin was a sculptor and painter. He attended Beverly Hills High School. He received his B.A. from Yale University in 1968, where he wrote for the Yale Daily News and was founder of The New Journal in 1967.

He received his M.A. in 1970 and his Ph.D. in international history from the University of Cambridge, where he was a Marshall Scholar. While at Cambridge, he wrote for various British magazines as well as The Atlantic, where he was a contributing editor, and The New York Times Magazine. He has honorary doctorates from Dartmouth College, Colorado School of Mines, University of Houston, and the University of Missouri.

== Career ==
=== 1970s ===
Early in his career, Yergin worked as a contributing editor for New York magazine. Through 1980, he was a lecturer at the Harvard Business School and, until 1985, a lecturer at Harvard Kennedy School. Yergin's first book, Shattered Peace: The Origins of the Cold War and the National Security State (1977), was partly based upon his doctoral dissertation and focused on the origins of the Cold War.

In the mid-1970s, while a post-doctoral fellow, he began to take a particular interest in energy in his writing. Basing the book on four years of research, with Robert B. Stobaugh he co-authored and co-edited Energy Future: The Report of the Energy Project at the Harvard Business School in 1979. According to the Los Angeles Times, the book "caused a considerable stir with its optimistic view of the possibilities of energy conservation and such alternative sources as solar power." It proved to be a The New York Times bestseller, ultimately selling 300,000 copies in six languages.

Within its first year of release, Yergin and Stobaugh were called to Washington, D.C. several times to testify before Congressional committees. He also advised James Schlesinger, the first US energy secretary, around the time of the Iranian revolution. According to Reuters, "since then he has given advice to every administration."

=== 1980s–1990s ===
He founded Cambridge Energy Research Associates (CERA) with Jamey Rosenfield in 1982 with the purchase of a $2 file cabinet from The Salvation Army. With Yergin as president, the energy research and consulting firm was created as a "quasi think-tank and source of energy industry analysis."

Yergin is arguably best known for his fourth book, The Prize: The Epic Quest for Oil, Money, and Power (1991). It became a number-one bestseller that won the Pulitzer Prize for General Nonfiction in 1992 and the Eccles Prize for the best book on economics for a general audience, selling around 700,000 copies in 17 languages. The book was adapted into a PBS/BBC series seen by around 100 million viewers both domestically and internationally, with Yergin as the principal storyteller. His next book was Russia 2010 and What It Means for the World (1993), written with Thane Gustafson, which provided scenarios for the development of Russia after the collapse of the Soviet Union.

=== 2000s–2010s ===
His 2002 book The Commanding Heights: The Battle for the World Economy, written with Joseph Stanislaw, described in narrative form the struggle over the "frontier" between governments and markets and the rise of globalization. In the "first major PBS series on business in more than a decade," he led the team that created an Emmy-winning six-hour PBS/BBC television series based on the book, serving as executive producer and co-writer and interviewing individuals such as Bill Clinton, Dick Cheney, Vicente Fox, and Mikhail Gorbachev.

External videos
- Booknotes interview with Yergin on The Prize, C-SPAN

CERA was acquired by the information company IHS Inc. in 2004, with Yergin becoming an executive of the combined company and remaining chairman of CERA. Described as a sequel to his book The Prize, Yergin's The Quest: Energy, Security, and the Remaking of the Modern World (2011) continued his history of the global oil industry but also addressed energy security, natural gas, electric power, climate change and the search for renewable sources of energy. Like his previous books, it was drafted in long-hand. In 2011 it was shortlisted for the Financial Times and McKinsey Business Book of the Year Award.

=== 2020s ===
In September 2020, Yergin published The New Map: Energy, Climate, and the Clash of Nations,with a revised edition published the following year. In December 2024, Yergin released an unabridged audiobook version of The Prize. The audiobook includes an epilogue narrated by Yergin reflecting on the relevance of the book's messaging present day, more than 30 years after its original publication date.

The Economist examined how the author addressed climate change in his book, The New Map. It said Yergin looks at climate change through the lens of prices, regulation, and subsidies, rather than through the eyes of a scientist, who may watch rising temperatures, tides, and migrating populations. "The question of what the Earth will actually be like in 2050—when Mr Yergin expects half of all cars sold still to be powered by fossil fuels—is not addressed."

== Viewpoints and research ==
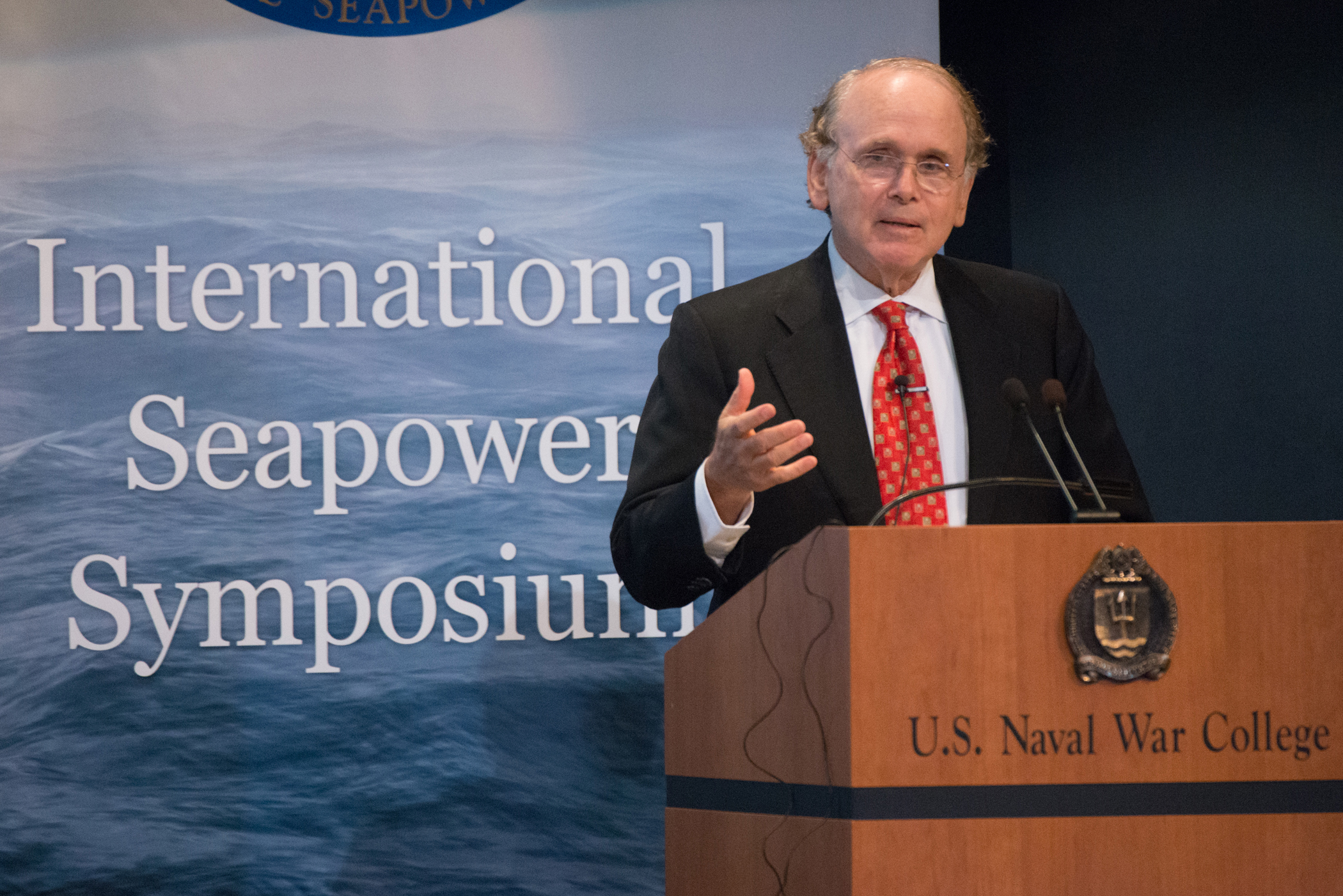
Yergin at the 2014 International Seapower Symposium

Yergin's articles and op-eds on energy, history, and the economy have been published in a variety of publications, including The Wall Street Journal, The New York Times, Foreign Affairs, The Washington Post, the Financial Times, and Forbes. He has also been interviewed about energy policy and international politics on various television programs. In 2003 he became CNBC's global energy expert, which he continued to do for a decade, and in September 2011 he appeared on The Colbert Report to discuss wind and solar power.

He addressed peak oil in a chapter in The Quest entitled "Is the World Running Out of Oil?" and in a 2011 essay published in The Wall Street Journal. Instead of a peak, Yergin predicted that future oil production would plateau as increasing prices moderate demand and stimulate production.

In 2019, Yergin and former U.S. Energy Secretary Ernest Moniz led a major 229-page study, Advancing the Landscape of Clean Energy Innovation, which was conducted by IHS Markit and Energy Futures Initiative for the Breakthrough Energy coalition, led by Bill Gates. The study identified ten areas for transformational energy breakthroughs. Axios quoted Yergin, "The purpose of the report is to provide a framework and a guide to people who want to invest in clean energy innovation."

Yergin chaired IHS Markit's study on "Reinventing the Wheel," which focused on changing transportation methods, the role of electric vehicles, and the timing of peak oil demand.

== Memberships and directorships ==
Yergin is the current vice chairman of S&P Global, appointed during the company's merger with IHS Markit. He became the vice chairman of IHS in 2012 and remained vice chairman when IHS merged with Markit in 2016. He is also chairman of S&P's annual CERAWeek energy conference.

He previously chaired the US Department of Energy's Task Force on Strategic Energy Research and Development. He is a trustee of the Brookings Institution, where he chairs the energy security roundtable. He is currently a director on the United States Energy Association and the U.S.-Russia Business Council.

He serves on the National Petroleum Council, which advises the U.S. Secretary of Energy. He is on the advisory boards of the Massachusetts Institute of Technology Energy Initiative, and the Columbia University Center on Global Energy Policy. Yergin has been a member of the Secretary of Energy Advisory Board under presidents Bill Clinton, George W. Bush, Barack Obama, and Donald Trump. In December 2016 Yergin joined a business forum composed primarily of CEOs assembled to provide strategic and policy advice on economic issues to President Donald Trump. The forum was disbanded in August 2017.

== Awards ==
Yergin was awarded the 1997 United States Energy Award for "lifelong achievements in energy and the promotion of international understanding." The International Association for Energy Economics gave Dr. Yergin its 2012 award for "outstanding contributions to the profession of energy economics and to its literature." In 2014 the Prime Minister of India presented Yergin with a Lifetime Achievement Award, and in 2015 the University of Pennsylvania presented him with the first Carnot Prize for "distinguished contributions to energy policy." The U.S. Department of Energy awarded him the first James Schlesinger Medal for Energy Security in 2014.

In 2023, Yergin received the Pioneer Award from Southern Methodist University.

In 2024, he received the Centennial Lifetime Achievement Award from the United States Energy Association on the occasion of its hundredth anniversary.

== Publishing history ==
=== Books as author ===
- Shattered Peace: The Origins of the Cold War and the National Security State. New York: Houghton Mifflin, 1977. Reprints: Penguin, 1978, 1980, ISBN 0-395-27267-X; Penguin, rev. & updated, 1990, ISBN 0-14-012177-3.
- The Prize: The Epic Quest for Oil, Money, and Power. New York: Simon & Schuster, 1991. ISBN 0-671-50248-4. Reprint: Simon & Schuster, 1992, ISBN 0-671-79932-0.
- The Quest: Energy, Security, and the Remaking of the Modern World. Penguin Press, 2011. ISBN 978-1-59420-283-4. (Revised, reprint edition, 2012.)
- The New Map: Energy, Climate, and the Clash of Nations. Penguin Press, 2020. ISBN 978-1-59420-643-6.

=== Books as co-author ===
- Energy Future: The Report of the Energy Project at the Harvard Business School. New York: Random House, 1979. ISBN 0-394-50163-2. Reprints: Ballantine Books, ISBN 0-394-29349-5; Knopf, 3rd ed., 1982, ISBN 0-394-71063-0; Random House, new revised 3rd ed., 1990. [With Robert B. Stobaugh.]
- Global Insecurity: A Strategy for Energy and Economic Renewal. New York: Houghton Mifflin, 1982. ISBN 0-395-30517-9. Reprint: Viking Penguin Books, 1983, ISBN 0-14-006752-3. [With Martin Hillenbrand.]
- Russia 2010: And What It Means for the World. New York: Random House, 1993. ISBN 0-679-42995-6. Reprint: Vintage, 1995, ISBN 0-679-75922-0. [With Thane Gustafson.]
- The Commanding Heights: The Battle Between Government and the Marketplace That Is Remaking the Modern World; New York: Simon & Schuster, 1998. ISBN 0-684-82975-4. [With Joseph A. Stanislaw.]
  - Revised, retitled and updated as The Commanding Heights: The Battle for the World Economy; New York: Free Press, 2002. ISBN 0-684-83569-X.

== See also ==
- List of Yale University people
- List of American non-fiction environmental writers
- List of economic advisors to Donald Trump
- List of University of Cambridge people
- Predicting the timing of peak oil
