= USEA =

USEA may refer to:

- United States Energy Association, a non partisan energy organization
- United States Eventing Association, a non profit Equestrian eventing association
- United States Esports Association, a non profit esports association
