= Thane Gustafson =

Professor of political science

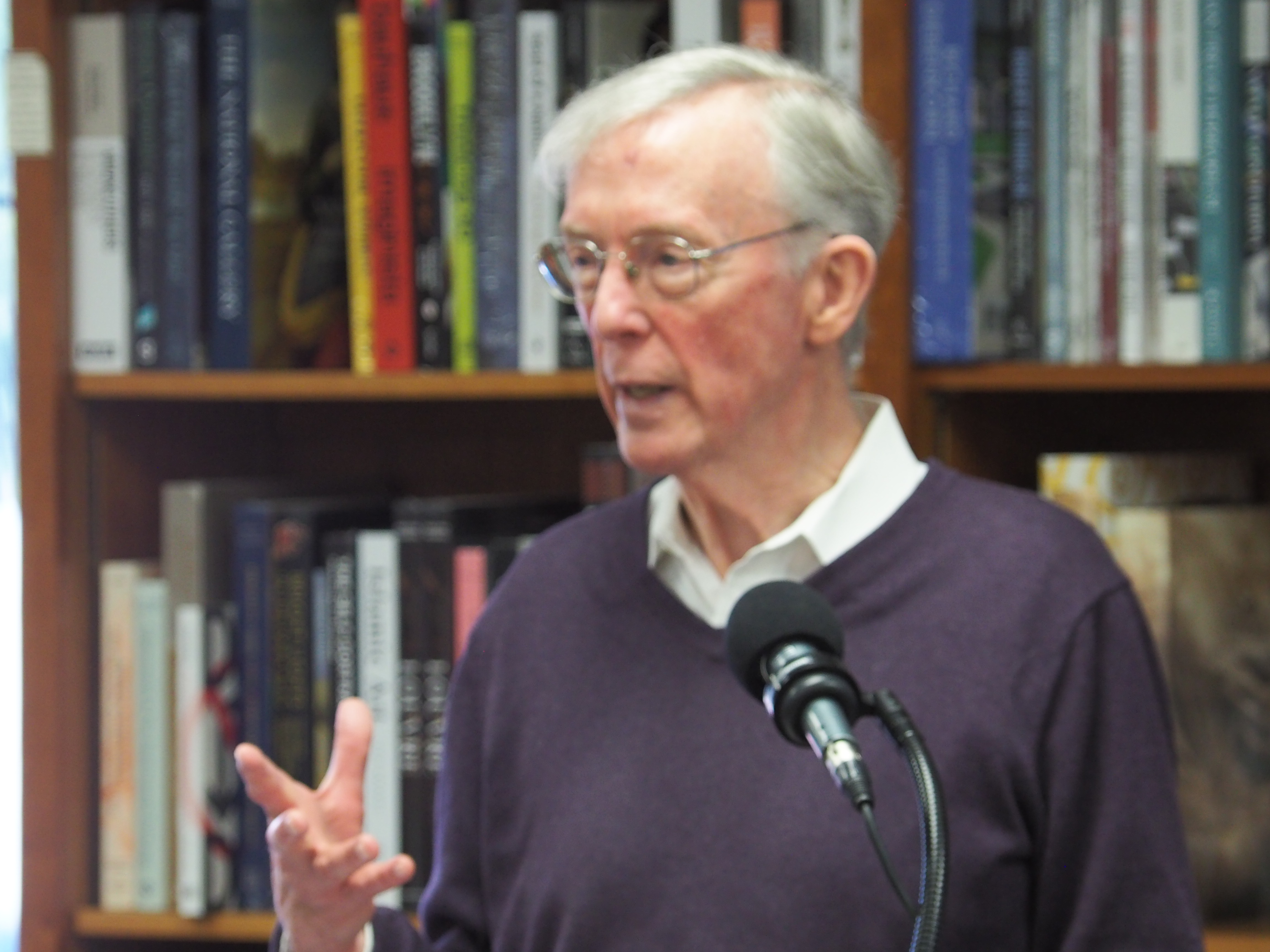
Thane Gustafson

Thane Gustafson (born 1944) is a professor of political science at Georgetown University, Washington, D.C., United States. He specializes in comparative politics and the political history of Russia and the former USSR.

Gustafson holds degrees in both political science and chemistry from the University of Illinois, and a doctorate from Harvard University. He is a former professor at Harvard, and a former analyst for RAND Corporation. He is Senior Director of Russian and Caspian Energy for IHS Cambridge Energy Research Associates (IHS CERA).

Gustafson is the author of Capitalism Russian Style, Crisis amid Plenty: The Politics of Soviet Energy under Brezhnev and Gorbachev (which was awarded the Marshall Shulman Book Prize as the best book on Soviet affairs), coauthor (with Daniel Yergin) of Russia 2010 and What It Means for the World, and Wheel of Fortune: The Battle for Oil and Power in Russia. He served as a Peace Corps volunteer in Côte d'Ivoire from 1966 to 1968 with his wife Ruth Gustafson.

== Works ==
- Capitalism Russian-style Cambridge, England; New York : Cambridge University Press, 1999. OCLC 60352157
- Wheel of Fortune: the Battle for Oil and Power in Russia, Cambridge, Massachusetts; London, England : The Belknap Press of Harvard University Press, 2012. ISBN 9780674975378
- Crisis amid Plenty: The Politics of Soviet Energy under Brezhnev and Gorbachev, Princeton University Press, 2016. ISBN 9780691636696
- The Bridge: Natural Gas in a Redivided Europe. Harvard University Press, 2020. ISBN 9780674987951
- Klimat: Russia in the Age of Climate Change. Harvard University Press, 2021. ISBN 9780674247437
- Perfect Storm: Russia's Failed Economic Opening, the Hurricane of War and Sanctions, and the Uncertain Future. Oxford University Press. ISBN 9780197795682
