= World oil crisis =

World oil crisis may refer to:

- 2000s energy crisis
- 1973 oil crisis
- World War II
