= Joseph Stanislaw =

American financial adviser

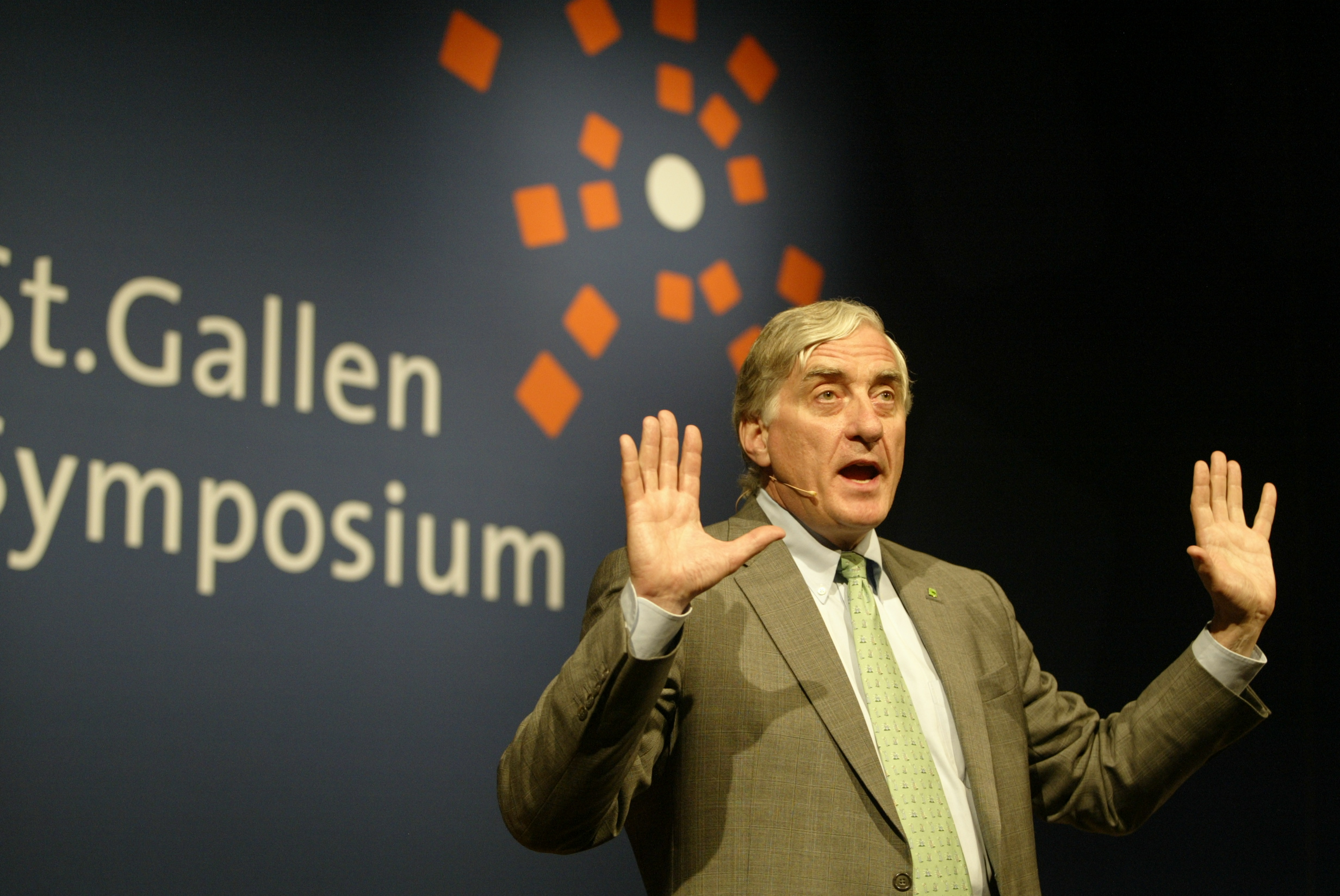
Image of Joseph A. Stanislaw

Joseph Stanislaw is a financial adviser on international markets and politics. He is also the co-founder and former president of Cambridge Energy Research Associates, an energy research consultancy that was acquired in 2004 by IHS Energy.

Stanislaw advises companies and countries on strategies to deal with the risks and opportunities in the evolving marketplace. He holds a B.A. from Harvard University and a PhD from Edinburgh University. He was once a professor at Cambridge University, and has served as senior economist at the Organisation for Economic Co-operation and Development's International Energy Agency, located in Paris. He currently serves on the board of advisors of the Nicholas Institute for Environmental Policy Solutions.

He co-authored The Commanding Heights: The Battle for the World Economy a book which became the subject of a six-hour documentary that aired on PBS in 2002.

Stanislaw is married to Augusta Perkins and father of Katrina, Louis and Henry Stanislaw.

== Selected publications ==
(Original edition, entitled: The Commanding Heights: The Battle Between Government and the Marketplace That Is Remaking the Modern World: New York: Simon & Schuster, 1998; ISBN 0-684-82975-4.) [With Daniel Yergin.] Revised, retitled, and updated ed. New York: Free Press, 2002. ISBN 0-684-83569-X.
