= Oil & Gas Journal =

Trade magazine

- Type: Weekly
- Owner: Endeavor Business Media
- Publisher: Jim Klingele
- Editor: Bob Tippee
- Founded: 1902; 123 years ago
- Language: English
- Headquarters: Tulsa, Oklahoma
- Sister newspapers: Offshore Magazine
- ISSN: 0030-1388
- OCLC number: 2390105
- Website: www.ogj.com

The Oil & Gas Journal is a petroleum industry weekly publication with a worldwide coverage. It is headquartered in Tulsa, Oklahoma, United States and the journal has a major presence in Houston, Texas, United States. The journal is published by Endeavor Business Media. Its publisher is Paul Westervelt, and editor is Bob Tippee. The first issue was published in 1902. Its online information services started in 1994.

LexisNexis database describes the Oil & Gas Journal as an authoritative source on the petroleum industry aimed at engineers, oil management and executives throughout the oil and gas industry. The weekly publishes news, analysis, statistics, and technology updates on exploration, drilling, production, pipeline, transportation, refining, processing and marketing. It is a subscription trade publication. The Oil & Gas Journal has about 20,000 subscribers for the printed issue and 80,000 for digital subscriptions.

The Oil & Gas Journal began in 1902 as the Oil Investor's Journal of Beaumont, Texas, which covered the oil boom that followed the nearby Spindletop discovery. As the oil discoveries spread along the Gulf Coast, the magazine relocated to Houston. In 1910, the magazine was purchased by Patrick C. Boyle, long-time publisher of the Oil City Derrick in Pennsylvania. Boyle moved the publication briefly to St. Louis, Missouri, then to Tulsa, where it still resides.

In 2018, owner PennWell was acquired by Clarion Events, a British company owned by Blackstone. In 2019, Clarion sold several PennWell divisions, including Oil & Gas, to Endeavor Business Media.

== See also ==
- Foster Natural Gas/Oil Report
- Platts – provides energy and metals information and benchmark price assessments in the physical energy markets
- Upstream
- List of mining journals
