= Grasping the large, letting go of the small =

1996 industrial reforms in China

The "grasping the large and letting the small go" (Chinese: 抓大放小; pinyin: Zhuā dà fàng xiǎo) is a Chinese Communist Party slogan to describe a wave of industrial reforms implemented by the government of the People's Republic of China in 1996. These reforms included efforts to corporatize state-owned enterprises (SOEs) and to downsize the state sector.

== Concept ==
The slogan and strategy were popularized by General Secretary of the Chinese Communist Party (CCP) Jiang Zemin and Chinese premier Zhu Rongji in 1997. The "grasping the large and letting the small go" policy was adopted in September 1997 at the 15th CCP Congress. The "grasping the large" component indicated that policy-makers should focus on maintaining state control over the largest state-owned enterprises (which tended to be controlled by the central government).

Through "grasping the large", the state focused on developing a core group of large SOEs in strategically important fields deemed as part of the commanding heights of the economy.

"Letting the small go" meant that the central government should relinquish control over smaller and unprofitable SOEs. Relinquishing control over these enterprises took a variety of forms: giving local governments authority to restructure the firms, privatizing them, or shutting them down. Many small or medium-sized SOEs were allowed to go bankrupt, which, subsequently triggered waves of unemployment and layoffs across China that became collectively known as Xiagang (下岗: step down from the post)

Following this policy, one thousand large SOEs received government subsidies and support with the goal of making them into national champions. Among the prominent examples is Baowu Steel Group, which was formed through the merger of several smaller steel enterprises.

== See also ==
- Economy of China
- SASAC
- The state advances as the private sector retreats
