= Angela Stent =

British-American foreign policy academic

Angela E. Stent
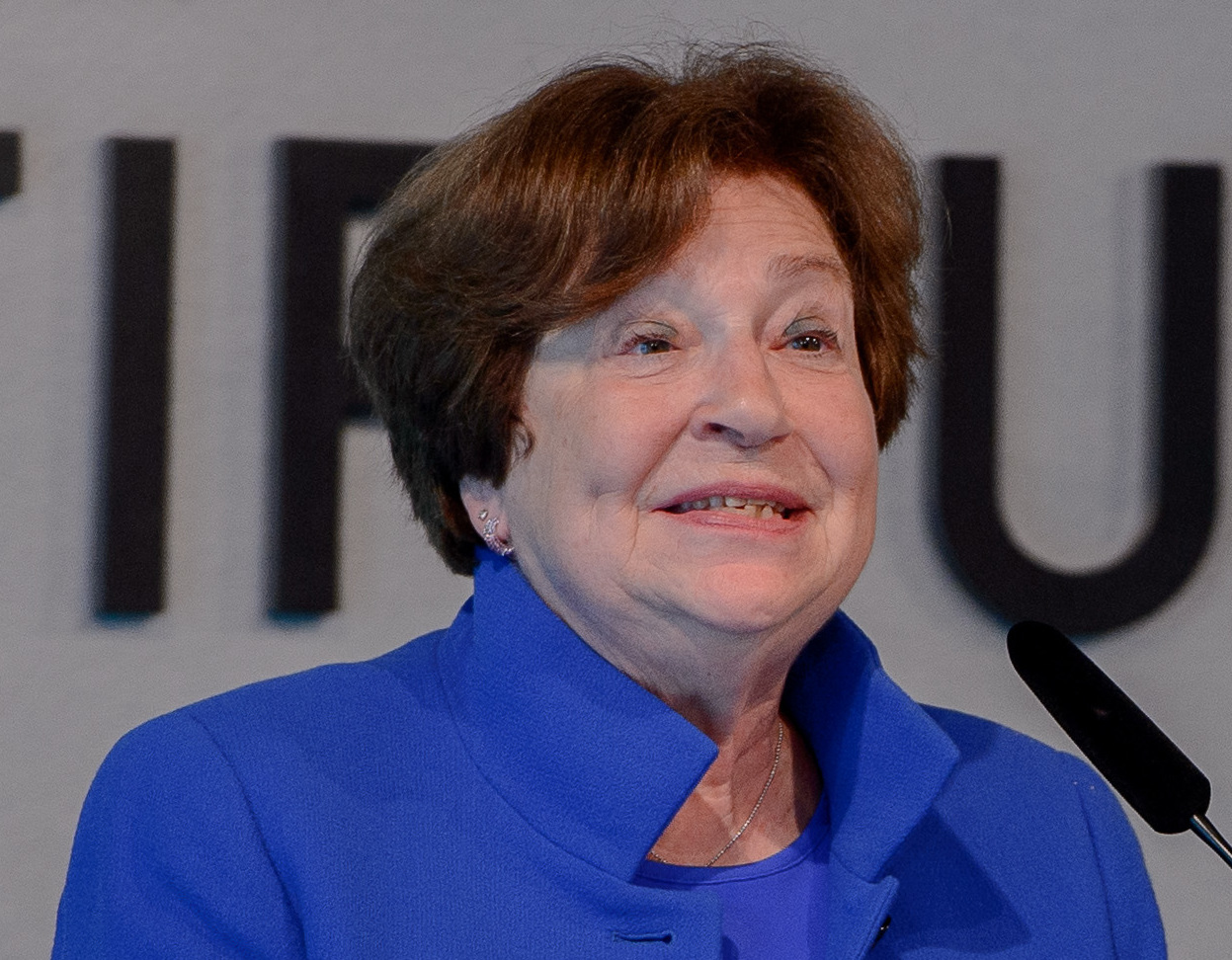
- Angela Stent in 2016
- Born: 1947 (age 78–79); London, United Kingdom
- Education: Girton College, Cambridge (BA); London School of Economics (MSc); Harvard University (MA, PhD)
- Occupation: Academic
- Spouse: Daniel Yergin
- Website: AngelaStent.com

Angela E. Stent is a British-born American foreign policy expert specializing in US and European relations with Russia and Russian foreign policy. She is professor emerita of Government and Foreign Service at Georgetown University and senior advisor and director emerita of its Center for Eurasian, Russian, and East European Studies. She is also a non-resident senior fellow at the Brookings Institution and a senior fellow at the American Enterprise Institute. She has served in the Office of Policy Planning in the US State Department and as National Intelligence Officer for Russia and Eurasia.

== Early life and education ==
Born in London in 1947, Stent was educated at Haberdashers' Aske's School for Girls before going up to Girton College, Cambridge University, where she received her B.A. in economics and modern history. She earned a master's degree in international relations with distinction from the London School of Economics. She earned a second master's degree in Soviet studies at Harvard University. She received her PhD from the Harvard Government Department.

== Career ==
Stent joined the Government Department at Georgetown University in 1979. In 2001, she received a joint appointment as Professor of Government and Foreign Service and became Director of the Center for Eurasian, Russian, and East European Studies. At the Brookings Institution, she co-chairs the Hewitt Forum on Post-Soviet Affairs. From 1999 to 2001, she served in the Office of Policy Planning in both the Clinton and Bush Administrations, where she was responsible for Russia and Eastern Europe. From 2004 to 2006, she was the National Intelligence Officer for Russia and Eurasia at the National Intelligence Council. From 2008 to 2012, she was a member of Supreme Allied Commander in Europe advisory panel.

=== Writings ===
Her first book, published in 1982 by Cambridge University Press, was From Embargo to Ostpolitik: the Political Economy of West German-Soviet Relations. While researching this book, Stent was mugged in Moscow, according to an article she wrote in The New York Times. She reported that the policeman investigating the case maintained it could not have happened, declaring, "We have no crime in the U.S.S.R." Russia and Germany Reborn: Unification, the Soviet Collapse, and the New Europe was her second book, published by Princeton University Press in 1999. In it, she analyzed and narrated the tumultuous events that led to the end of communism in Eastern Europe, the collapse of the Soviet Union, the emergence of modern Russia, and the reunification of West and East Germany. Mikhail Gorbachev, former Communist Party First Secretary and then President of the Soviet Union, was among the interviewees for the book. When Stent asked Gorbachev what world leader he most admired, his answer was "Ronald Reagan was the greatest western statesman with whom I dealt. He was an intelligent and astute politician who had vision and imagination."

==== The Limits of Partnership ====
External videos
- After Words interview with Stent on The Limits of Partnership, February 1, 2014, C-SPAN

Stent's 2014 book, The Limits of Partnership: US-Russian Relations in the Twenty-First Century, examines the difficulties for the United States in establishing a productive relationship with post-Soviet Russia. Stent argues that four US presidents have pursued their own "resets" with Russia, each of which ended in disappointment. For her research for the book, Stent was able to draw on a decade of meetings that Vladimir Putin has held with Russia experts. At one, Stent asked Putin whether Russia was an energy superpower. He said that "superpower" was "a word we used during the Cold War. I have never referred to Russia as an energy superpower. But we do have greater possibilities than almost any other country in the world. If we put together Russia's energy potential in all areas, oil, gas and nuclear, our country is unquestionably the leader."

In 2014, Stent was awarded the American Academy's Douglas Dillon Award for excellent authorship on topics of American diplomacy by The American Academy of Diplomacy.

==== Putin's World ====
External videos
- After Words interview with Stent on Putin's World, March 16, 2019, C-SPAN

Stent's book Putin's World: Russia Against the West and with the Rest was published in February 2019. It assesses Putin's view of Russia's place in the world through examining Russia's ongoing relationships with allies and adversaries, specifically narrowing in on Russia's downward spiral with NATO, Europe, and the United States and its ties to China, Japan, and the Middle East, in addition to its neighbors like Ukraine.

Stent argues that "as the Trump team accelerates the U.S. retreat from the Middle East, Mr. Putin has been quick to spot and take advantage of openings, and he operates without many of the constraints of his Soviet predecessors. The U.S. will have to get used to dealing with a savvy rival for influence in the Middle East." It considers how Russia has no real allies and speculates what may occur to the country and its geopolitical identity upon the ending of Putin's term in 2024 and how the West should respond to Russia moving forward.

== Other activities ==
Stent is on the advisory board of Women in International Security (WIIS), an organization dedicated to promoting women's careers in the national security area. Stent played a key role in WIIS's conferences in Tallinn and Prague. In 2008 she received a Fulbright Fellowship to teach at the Moscow State Institute of International Relations (MGIMO) and was a George H.W. Bush-Axel Springer Berlin Prize Fellow at the American Academy in Berlin. She co-chaired the Carnegie Corporation's Working Group on U.S-Russian Relations from 2008 to 2012 and was a Co-Convenor of the US-Russian "Second Track" Discussions. She served as a Trustee of the Eurasia Foundation. She is a contributing editor to Survival: Global Politics and Strategy and has written numerous articles for academic and general publications such as The Wall Street Journal, The Washington Post, and The New York Times. She has also appeared on The PBS News Hour, CNN, BBC, as well as other major U.S. and German networks.

== Works ==
- Russia and Germany Reborn: Unification, the Soviet Collapse, and the New Europe. Princeton University Press. 13 March 2000. ISBN 1-4008-2280-7.
- From Embargo to Ostpolitik: The Political Economy of West German-Soviet Relations, 1955–1980. Cambridge University Press. 1 December 1982. ISBN 978-0-521-52137-6.
- Angela Stent (5 January 2014). The Limits of Partnership: U.S.-Russian Relations in the Twenty-First Century. Princeton University Press. pp. 294–. ISBN 978-1-4008-4845-4.
- Angela Stent (26 February 2019). Putin's World: Russia Against the West and with the Rest. Twelve. p. 448. ISBN 978-1455533022.

== External talk ==
- Appearances on C-SPAN
