= Robert B. Stobaugh =

- Born: Robert Blair Stobaugh; October 15, 1927; McGehee, Arkansas
- Died: August 14, 2017 (aged 89); Houston, Texas
- Occupations: Chemical engineer; educator; economist
- Years active: 1947 - 1996
- Known for: Economics
- Notable work: Co-author, Energy Future: The report of the Energy Project at the Harvard Business School.

Robert Blair Stobaugh (15 October 1927 – 14 August 2017) was an American educator noted for his research into energy economics and corporate governance.

He earned a degree in chemical engineering from Louisiana State University, (Note: Stobaugh was recognized at LSU for his excellence in chemical engineering and mathematics.) and went to work as an engineer at companies such as Esso, Caltex and Monsanto Chemical Company. (Note: Stobaugh worked at Monsanto's Hydrocarbons Division petrochemical plant in Texas City, Texas.) After leaving Monsanto, he earned a doctorate degree in business administration from Harvard University. He spent 29 years as a professor at the Harvard Business School (HBS). He served as director of the HBS Energy Project from 1972 to 1983. According to Harvard Business School, Stobaugh focused his research interests in three areas: corporate governance, energy, and international business. The school credited him with writing or coauthoring fifteen books and over one hundred other publications during his 30-year career with the school. Arguably, his most notable publication was Energy Future: the Report of the Energy Project, which he co-authored with Daniel Yergin in 1979.

Following his retirement from Harvard, he moved to Houston, Texas, where he taught at Rice University for four years. After that, he published the first volume of his memoir entitled "Starting from Arkansas: Four Continents, Four Countries, Four Kids."

== Early years ==
Stobaugh was raised in the small town of McGehee, Arkansas. His parents were Robert B. Stobaugh, Sr. and Helen Paris Stobaugh, who owned a laundry. He also had an older half-brother and a younger full brother. Robert entered school at the age of four, then later skipped a grade. At the age of 15, he enrolled in Louisiana State University at Baton Rouge, Louisiana. He earned a Bachelor of Science degree in chemical engineering in 1947. His first job as a chemical engineer was at the Standard Oil of New Jersey (Esso) Refinery in Baton Rouge. He soon transferred to Creole Petroleum Corporation, which was then an Esso subsidiary, Then, he joined Caltex Petroleum Corporation, a joint venture of Standard Oil of California (now known as Chevron Corporation) and Texaco. He was first assigned to Caltex headquarters in New York City. This led to an assignment in Bahrain, followed by a move to London. He then joined Monsanto in the Houston area. While with Monsanto, Stobaugh realized that top managers typically had earned technical degrees, but had little training in business administration and economics. He corrected this deficiency in his own training by enrolling in a night school curriculum at the University of Houston.

== Academic career ==
Stobaugh resigned from Monsanto and enrolled in the Harvard Doctor of Business Administration (DBA) program in 1965. He earned a doctorate in 1968 and became a tenured professor in 1971. In that same year, he led an HBS research team studying the relationship of overseas investment by American businesses and the U.S. economy. The team concluded that the effect was positive. Stobaugh testified before a congressional committee against legislation proposed to restrict such investment. In 1983 he was named as Charles Edward Wilson Professor of Business Administration, teaching courses in general management, energy, international business, and production.

In 1972, before the Arab oil embargo occurred, HBS Dean, Lawrence E. Fouraker, asked Stobaugh to organize a venture at HBS called the Energy Project. He recruited a team of Harvard students and faculty who also had knowledge and experience in energy issues, political science and technology.

In 1979, Stobaugh and a colleague, Daniel Yergin, co-authored Energy Future: the Report of the Energy Project at the Harvard Business School, which became a New York Times bestseller. This book was based on the premise that the United States should transition from a policy of unrestricted reliance on imported oil to a more diverse variety of energy resource, and presented the pros and cons of various energy alternatives. Stobaugh was later quoted as saying, “Our goal was to produce a plain English book that would provide a framework for thinking about the energy future.... We wanted to relate not only to academics, but also to the general public and people in the political world who were making key decisions.” The book received widespread publicity even outside academia and became a best seller. Its findings were briefed to President Jimmy Carter, and triggered major energy policy initiatives by the Carter Administration.

== Awards and honors ==
- Hall of Distinction, Louisiana State University. 1987.
- Fellow and past president of the Academy of International Business.
- Director of the National Association of Corporate Directors (NACD).
- Harvard Business School Distinguished Service Award recipient. 2001

== Retirement ==
Stobaugh retired from HBS in 1996, and continued to lead a very busy life doing things that interested him. He continued to serve on several corporate boards and two non-profit organizations, the Alliance to Save Energy (Washington, DC), and the French Cultural Center,(Boston). He was a director of the National Association of Corporate Directors from 1996-2005, and served on various commissions (either as chairman or co-chairman) that advocated best management practices such as stock ownership by corporate directors, outside director majorities, and prohibitions against corporate use of director-owned providers of professional or financial services.

Little known to the public, Stobaugh maintained second homes in Provence, France for 38 years. First, he bought and renovated an abandoned former 16th Century silk factory, then later moving to a garden apartment in Aix-la-Provence. He enjoyed a more laid-back lifestyle there visiting markets and vineyards, while the lack of other interruptions give him time to write. He is credited with writing, coauthoring or editing 15 monographs and books, as well as over a hundred articles.

== Family ==
At the time Stobaugh graduated from LSU, he married Beverly Parker, who had also been an LSU student. They remained together for 42 years, until her death in 1990. In 1991, he remarried to a Houston widow named June Milton Gray, who had two teen-age sons. The Stobaugh family continued to live in Belmont, Massachusetts, then moved back to Houston in 2004. June died in Houston in 2017.
