= Commanding heights of the economy =

Strategically important sectors of the economy

In Marxist-Leninist theory, the commanding heights of the economy are certain strategically important economic sectors. Some examples of industries considered to be part of the commanding heights include public utilities, natural resources, and sectors relating to both foreign trade and domestic trade.

== History ==
This phrase emerged from a branch of modern political philosophy concerned with organising society. According to Yevgeni Preobrazhensky, a Bolshevik economist, control over the commanding heights of the economy would ensure primitive socialist accumulation. The phrase can be traced back to Vladimir Lenin's defense of the New Economic Policy (NEP), which saw market-oriented reforms while the state retained control of the commanding heights. Lenin used the military metaphor to justify NEP, proposing that free markets could be permitted so as long as the government retained control of certain commanding heights like heavy industry and transport.

== Specific national contexts ==
=== China ===
China retains state control over the commanding heights of the economy in key industries like infrastructure, telecommunications, and finance despite significant marketization of the economy since reform and opening up. Specific mechanisms implementing its control of the commanding heights in these areas include public property rights, pervasive administrative involvement, and Communist Party supervision of senior managers.

Through Jiang Zemin's emphasis on grasping the large, letting go of the small, the China's central government focused on developing a core group of large state-owned enterprises (SOEs) in strategically important fields deemed as part of the commanding heights of the economy, while relinquishing control over smaller and unprofitable SOEs.

For an example from socialism with Chinese characteristics, while the Chinese economic reform has generally shifted funding sources for higher education from the government to individual students, the Chinese Communist Party also organized projects like Project 985 and Project 211 to retain government funding and therefore influence over certain elite institutions.

=== India ===
The second of the Five-Year Plans of India, overseen by Jawaharlal Nehru, was an attempt to industrialize India through state control of the commanding heights.

== New commanding heights ==
The phrase "commanding heights" often occurs in modern political commentary outside of Marxist connotations.

=== Healthcare and education ===
In service economies, where the relative importance of industry has decreased, Arnold Kling posited in 2011 that healthcare and education are the new commanding heights. The two sectors are central to employment and consumption, and in the United States are driven primarily by government intervention. In the ten years preceding 2011, employment in education and healthcare in the United States increased by 16%, despite employment in other sectors decreasing.

=== Internet ===
Other commentators have identified digital platforms and the internet as the new commanding heights of the economy.

== See also ==
- The Commanding Heights

== Bibliography ==
- Bonner, Stephen Eric (2013). Socialism Unbound: Principles, Practices, and Prospects. Columbia University Press. ISBN 978-0231527354.
- Wesson, Robert G. (1978). Lenin's Legacy: The Story of the CPSU. Stanford, Calif: Hoover Press. ISBN 978-0817969226.
- Nove, Alec; Nove, Alexander (1969). An Economic History of the U.S.S.R. IICA. p. 83-86.
