= The Commanding Heights =

1998 book by Daniel Yergin and Joseph Stanislaw

The Commanding Heights: The Battle for the World Economy
- Author: Daniel Yergin, Joseph Stanislaw
- Subject: Economics, globalization
- Publisher: Free Press
- Publication date: 1998
- Pages: 488
- ISBN: 978-0-684-83569-3

The Commanding Heights: The Battle for the World Economy is a book by Daniel Yergin and Joseph Stanislaw. It was first published as The Commanding Heights: The Battle Between Government and the Marketplace That Is Remaking the Modern World in 1998. In 2002, it was adapted as a documentary of the same title and later released on DVD.

The Commanding Heights attempts to trace the rise of free markets during the last century as well as the process of globalization. Yergin attributes the origin of the phrase commanding heights to a speech by Vladimir Lenin referring to the control of perceived key segments of a national economy.

== Overview ==
The authors take the thesis that prior to World War I, the world effectively lived in a state of globalization, which they term the First Era of Globalization. The authors define globalization as periods in which free markets predominate and countries place few, if any, limits on exports, immigration, imports, or information exchanges. Overall, they see globalization as a positive movement that improves the standard of living for all the people connected to it, from the richest to the poorest. According to the authors, the rise of communism and fascism, not to mention the Great Depression, nearly extinguished capitalism, which rapidly lost popularity.

After World War II, the authors note that the work of economist John Maynard Keynes came to be widely accepted in Western economies. Keynes believed in government regulation of the economy, which the authors underline as Keynes' great influence and prestige. The authors consider that the so-called commanding heights were often owned or severely regulated by governments in accordance with Keynes' ideas.

The authors discuss how the political changes of the 1980s ushered in accompanying changes in economic policy. The old trend changed when Margaret Thatcher became prime minister of the United Kingdom and when Ronald Reagan was elected president of the United States. Both leaders parted ways with Keynesian economics and governed more in the tradition of the works of Friedrich Hayek, who opposed government regulation, tariffs, and other infringements on a pure free market and those of Milton Friedman, who emphasized the futility of using inflationary monetary policies to influence rates of economic growth.

In practice, Hayek's policies were applied only selectively, as Reagan's 1986 income tax reforms substantially increased taxes on the lowest quintile of wage-earners but dramatically decreased rates for the upper two quintiles. In contrast to Hayek's ideas, Reagan's policies also continued and expanded tax write-offs, rebates and subsidies for many large corporations. Friedman's monetarism was also abandoned in practice as government-issued debt as a percentage of GDP rose dramatically throughout the 1980s. While Thatcher, Reagan, and their successors made sweeping reforms, the authors argue that the current era of globalization finally began around 1991, with the collapse of the Soviet Union. Since then, they assert countries embracing free markets have prospered on the whole, and those adhering to central planning have failed.

While strongly in favor of this trend, the authors worry that globalization will not last. More specifically, they believe that if inequality in economic growth remains high and if Third World nations are not offered the proper opportunities and incentives to support capitalism, the movement will end just as the first era did. The authors place so much emphasis on narrowing economic gaps because they believe, contrary to many of the people who are interviewed, that there is no ideological support for capitalism, only the pragmatic fact that the system works better than any other, as they remark:

The market also requires something else: legitimacy. But here it faces an ethical conundrum. It is based upon contracts, rules, and choice—in short, on self-restraint—which contrasts mightily with other ways of organizing economic activity. Yet a system that takes the pursuit of self-interest and profit as its guiding light does not necessarily satisfy the yearning in the human soul for belief and some higher meaning beyond materialism. In the Spanish Civil War in the late 1930s, Republican soldiers are said to have died with the word "Stalin" on their lips. Their idealized vision of Soviet communism, however misguided, provided justification for their ultimate sacrifice. Few people would die with the words "free markets" on their lips.

== International analysis ==
In the book, the authors examine briefly many different nations and regions and their economic development since World War II. (In the case of industrialized countries, they often begin before the war.) Admitting that the book cannot touch on every single aspect (Yergin remarks that the topic of their book constitutes an entire new academic discipline), the authors make many assertions.

=== United States ===
The robber barons were often condemned in the press, but the United States had much more commitment to industrialization and free markets than did other countries in the late 19th and the early 20th centuries. Unlike many countries after World War I, the 1920s saw great economic expansion for upper-income individuals and a growth in median income. However, labor unrest continued to mount throughout the 1920s and the 1930s because of the lack of wage and hour rules, child labor protections, unemployment insurance, right to organize, workplace safety requirements, and social security, which all continued to exacerbate the discontents of the substantial numbers of working poor.

The Great Depression caused massive unemployment and massive public distrust of corporations and wealthy individuals. In response, the New Deal of President Franklin D. Roosevelt went into effect with massive public support. Many lawyers and economists, influenced by Keynes, worked under the New Deal and believed that free markets would lead to disaster without proper regulation.

The American economy boomed for about 30 years after World War II with the benefit of Keynesianism, robust antitrust regulation to promote competition and financial regulations preventing the most volatile forms of market speculation, high unionization rates and protections promoting the growth of domestic industry. However, during the 1970s, stagflation was brought on by the 1973 oil crisis and the shift from the gold standard to fiat currency, which discredited the policy consensus that was set in place by the New Deal Coalition. Eventually, Ronald Reagan was elected as president in 1980, and many of the statutes and organizations created by the New Deal were dismantled.

=== United Kingdom ===
London was the center of the so-called First Era of Globalization because of the power and resources of the British Empire. World War I severely weakened Britain, causing massive unemployment. The United Kingdom successfully held out during World War II and emerged victorious, but the war effectively caused the dismantling of its empire.

Winston Churchill was influenced by the work of Hayek and opposed heavy government interference in the British economy. The Labour Party, led by Clement Attlee, came to power in force after the 1945 general election and was dedicated to government controls to prevent another economic crisis. The United Kingdom's major industries were nationalized over the following decades (including the Bank of England, electricity, water, natural gas, railways, mining, bus transport, telecommunications, along with large portions of the oil, shipbuilding, aerospace, automotive, and steel industries.

Basic human services such as healthcare and university education were brought under government control and made available for free, while rents in the private housing market were regulated and council housing provided homes for around a third of the population by the late 1970s. Meanwhile, practically all occupations and wages were heavily regulated and unionized.

The practices became so prevalent that even Conservative governments elected after the initial wave of nationalisations in the late 1940s kept them. However, during the 1970s, massive strikes by unions (see the Three-Day Week and Winter of Discontent) and other economic woes, such as the 1973 oil crisis, almost ground the British economy to a halt. Thatcher, an ardent admirer of Hayek, began privatizing industries. While her results were initially mixed, the Falklands War brought on a nationalistic fervor that kept Thatcher in office long enough to keep her reforms in place. Even when the Labour Party later came back to power, it did not attempt to challenge the key principles of Thatcherism.

=== Soviet Union and Russia ===
Within a few years of the rise of the Russian Revolution, the Soviet economy went into a major crisis. Lenin responded with the New Economic Policy, a program that allowed limited capitalistic activity, which resulted in what he would call state capitalism, and the economy began to improve. Lenin's commanding heights speech was his attempt to defend himself against accusations that he sold out the principles of the revolution by implementing the new policy.

Under Joseph Stalin, the Soviet agricultural and heavy manufacturing sectors were largely centralized. During the 1940s to the 1970s, the Soviet economy grew at a rate that outpaced that of Western European nations.

By the 1980s, however, the Soviet economy was in shambles. Because of a lack of incentives and, ironically, a more tolerant central government, workers did not put much effort into their duties. Nonetheless, the Soviet Union continued to build the military even though at times such spending took up half the country's revenue. Mikhail Gorbachev tried to reform the economy, but he took only limited steps (see perestroika and glasnost). When he lifted the Brezhnev Doctrine and allowed Poland's Solidarity to usurp that country's communist regime, the entire Warsaw Pact collapsed, soon followed by the Soviet Union itself.

However, even with the fall of the Soviet Union and the rise of the relatively free market-minded Boris Yeltsin, former members of the Communist Party of the Soviet Union maintained much power in Russia, blocked free-market movements, and forced the resignation of Yeltsin's free-market allies such as Yegor Gaidar. During the 1996 presidential election, Yeltsin was forced to accept support from Russian oligarchs to counter the growing power of the Communist Party of the Russian Federation. While Yeltsin remained in power, the privatization of industries proceeded extremely unequally.

=== Germany ===
As had been predicted by Keynes, the hyperinflation caused by the Treaty of Versailles devastated the German economy and created political instability. In addition to widespread unemployment, the hyperinflation effectively wiped out the country's middle class. That environment made it easy for the Nazi Party to gain power. The authors also argue that the Nazis practiced central planning although industries were privatized en masse.

After the war and the division of Germany, East Germany came under the rule of the Soviets, and West Germany remained part of the Western powers. When economic conditions in occupied West Germany failed to improve, Ludwig Erhard completely destroyed price controls in 1948 without consulting the occupying powers. Western Germany underwent a fast massive economic recovery, but such free-market reforms were largely confined to that country for many years.

By the time of German reunification in 1989, West Germany was an economic power, and East Germany faced many problems because of the collapse of the central planning authority.

=== India ===
Unlike Mahatma Gandhi, who supported a village-centric economy, after India's independence in 1947, its first prime minister, Jawaharlal Nehru, promoted industrialization. However, he supported government-controlled development and the bureaucracy that developed stifled innovation. The authors of The Commanding Heights describe this as the British Raj being replaced by a "permit Raj", using a sarcastic term coined by Chakravarti Rajagopalachari. Bribery and delays became common in the Indian economy while many prominent economists studied the country and attempted to finetune its central planning.

By the 1990s, the Indian government began to relax these stringent regulations mainly under the influence of Finance Minister and later Prime Minister Manmohan Singh. The Indian economy bloomed under the effects of exports and outsourcing, and political parties since then have continued to promote those changes. The free-marketer Singh was appointed prime minister when his party won the elections in 2004 although he was not the victorious United Progressive Alliance's stated candidate, and the general expectation had been that Sonia Gandhi would take the seat.

=== South America ===
Under the influence of dependency theory, a Marxist approach to international economics, many Latin American countries attempted to industrialize by limiting imports of manufactured goods and subsidizing their own industries. However, companies had little incentive to become efficient or innovative in the absence of competition and in the presence of government subsidies. By the 1980s, the economic problems of the countries became obvious, and much of the West's investment was lost.

Chile became an experiment in free markets when Augusto Pinochet called in followers of Friedman to evaluate the economy, the so-called Chicago boys. The authors argue that the economic reforms proved successful, but since Pinochet was a dictator who came to power in a coup and had many political opponents murdered, the whole idea of free-market reform became linked to fascism. Though the authors and Friedman claim that the reforms eventually promoted democracy, they acknowledge that the issue and their interpretation of events are extremely controversial.

Bolivia was hit with hyperinflation as well. During the 1980s, economist Jeffrey Sachs was sent as a consultant and new President Gonzalo Sánchez de Lozada reined in inflation in the 1990s by severely cutting government spending. While Bolivia remained a very poor country, the authors argue that it is better off now because its inflation was curtailed. They also argue that Bolivia's example expunges the bad reputation that free-market economics acquired in Chile as Bolivia's reforms came after a democratic election.

=== Other countries ===
The authors argue that Africa's economic development was severely hindered by central planning, socialist ideas, and political dictatorships that promoted warfare and other conflicts.

While Japan was seen for many years as an economic success story as late as the early 1990s, the authors argue that its ongoing recession since then resulted from its governments refusal to stop subsidies to many of its industries and companies (the issue is ongoing).

Poland's free-market reforms pushed by Solidarity and Lech Wałęsa were initially mixed and criticized by its citizens, but by the late 1990s, the Polish economy was doing much better than other former communist states in the Eastern Bloc. One feature of the Polish economy that makes it different from other capitalistic countries is that it is dominated by small business rather than corporations or conglomerates.

China is another major ongoing issue. While Deng Xiaoping, after the death of Mao Zedong, started the reform and opening up, he did not promote civil liberties or other political freedoms, as was demonstrated by his willingness to crush pro-democracy demonstrators. While the authors hope according to Friedman's ideas that free markets would eventually promote a free society, it has not yet happened although China's economy continues to grow.

== Documentary ==
In 2002, PBS aired a six-hour documentary based on the book. This was later sold on DVD and is available to view for free at PBS's website. The documentary is narrated by David Ogden Stiers.

The documentary series consists of three two-hour episodes:

- Episode 1: "The Battle of Ideas", produced and directed by William Cran
- Episode 2: "The Agony of Reform", produced and directed by William Cran, co-produced by Peter Sommer, co-directed by Greg Barker
- Episode 3: "The New Rules of the Game", directed, written and produced by Greg Barker

Appearing several years after the book was released allowed the documentary film to address many of the items that Yergin and Stanislaw missed in their original book, including the collapse of Asian economies, the anti-globalization movement and the September 11 attacks. All told, two of the documentary's six hours (the entire final third) address things that happened since the original book was published. They also include free market solutions to international poverty that were not included in the book, and they interview economist Hernando de Soto, whose book on the subject was not published until after the initial printing of The Commanding Heights.

Like the book, the documentary attracted support and criticism. The anti-globalization movement argued they were portrayed unfairly. In the documentary, James Wolfensohn, then president of the World Bank, is interviewed and says that such protesters are attacking people "who are devoting their lives to addressing the very questions that these people claim to be addressing". The documentary includes a scene of Wolfensohn being hit in the face with a pie by a protester.

In contrast to the book, the PBS documentary is more wary of the possible end of the current era of globalization. It includes a parallel between radio stocks of the 1920s and dot com stocks of the 1990s: both were industries built on new technology that had little capital, but fell prey to a market bubble. Likewise, the documentary makes a comparison between the terrorist attacks of September 11, 2001 and the terrorist assassination of Archduke Franz Ferdinand in 1914. Venture Capitalist Tim Draper appears in the third episode and speaks about his success at the time with Hotmail for email and other early internet investments. This was many years before Draper would invest in many other successful tech companies of the 2000s, including Tesla anf Coinbase, and would even make a large purchase of Bitcoin from a sale of the cryptocurrency after the fall of the Silk Road after 2013.

The production was financed by donations from Electronic Data Systems, FedEx, BP, The Pew Charitable Trusts, John Templeton Foundation, Smith Richardson Foundation, and the Corporation for Public Broadcasting.

== See also ==
- Free to Choose
