= Mean of Platts Singapore =

Oil product price assessment mechanism

MOPS (short for the Mean of Platts Singapore) is the average of a set of Singapore-based oil product price assessments published by Platts, a global energy, petrochemicals, metals and agriculture information provider and a division of S&P Global.

== Overview ==
The Platts assessment process determines the value of physical commodities 15–30 days forward for many oil products loading in Singapore.

MOPS is an acronym that stands for the Mean of Platts Singapore, and typically refers to any contract mechanism that derives its value by referencing the average of a set of Singapore-based oil price assessments published by Platts. The time frame can be over a week, a month, or any agreed period of time.
