= Nicholas Institute for Environmental Policy Solutions =

Nicholas Institute for Environmental Policy Solutions is one of six interdisciplinary research institutes at Duke University located in Durham, North Carolina. Founded in 2005, it became the first environmental-policy-centered Institute with a Duke University affiliation.

The Nicholas Institute was established in 2005. In its first decade, it has led a variety of influential projects. The Nicholas Institute advised California on several aspects of the design of the country's first economy-wide cap and trade program for greenhouse gases. The Nicholas Institute brought attention to one of the world's most critical environmental problems by providing the first estimates of global carbon dioxide emissions from the destruction of coastal and marine ecosystems. Through the seminal report, A Silent Tsunami, the Nicholas Institute provided a material contribution to legislation aimed at dramatically improving access to clean water and sanitation around the world. And the Nicholas Institute helped natural resource managers connect their decisions to things people care about with the first guidebook to present a scientifically defensible approach to ecosystem services assessment.

Tim Profeta is founding director. The Institute's other program directors include Brian Murray, Jonas Monast, Amy Pickle, John Virdin, Martin Doyle, and Lydia Olander. Members of the Board of Advisors include William K. Reilly, Peter Nicholas, and Joseph A. Stanislaw.
