= Foster Natural Gas/Oil Report =

Weekly publication covering the North American energy industry

Foster Natural Gas Report
- Type: Weekly publication
- Founder: J. Rhoades Foster
- Publisher: Foster Associates, Inc.
- Editor-in-chief: Edgar D. Boshart
- Founded: March 23, 1956
- Language: English
- Headquarters: Bethesda, Maryland (Washington, D.C. Metropolitan Area)
- ISSN: 0095-1587
- OCLC number: 60623206
- Website: www.fosterreport.com

The Foster Natural Gas/Oil Report, formerly known as the Foster Natural Gas Report and Foster Associates Report, is a U.S.-based weekly newsletter published by Foster Associates, Inc. It was founded in Washington, D.C., on March 23, 1956, by J. Rhoades Foster and a group of economists. Its editor-in-chief is Edgar D. Boshart.

The report publishes news about issues and events relevant to the regulated natural gas and oil market in North America. Topics of interest include production, marketing, transportation, distribution and end use. It reviews activities at the Federal Energy Regulatory Commission (FERC) and the National Energy Board (NEB) of Canada and well as the public hearings and rulings of state regulatory agencies. The report also covers leaders in politics, industry and regulatory entities related to the natural gas industry and public utility companies.

== See also ==
- Oil & Gas Journal – a leading petroleum industry weekly publication
- Platts – provides energy and metals information and benchmark price assessments in the physical energy markets
