= The Quest: Energy, Security, and the Remaking of the Modern World =

2011 book by Daniel Yergin

- Author: Daniel Yergin
- Language: English
- Genre: Non-fiction
- Publisher: Penguin Press
- Publication date: September 20, 2011 (revised reprint, September 26, 2012)
- Publication place: United States
- Media type: Print (hardback, paperback), e-book, audiobook
- Pages: 832
- ISBN: 1594202834
- Preceded by: The Prize

The Quest: Energy, Security, and the Remaking of the Modern World is an international bestselling book by energy expert Daniel Yergin. The book was initially published on September 20, 2011 through Penguin Press and is considered to be the follow-up to Yergin's 1992 Pulitzer Prize–winning history of oil, The Prize, and describes the development of the current energy system and prospects for the future. Upon its release, the book received praise and criticism both for its breadth of subject as well as for its impartiality. It is often suggested as a "primer" or "guide" to the energy field for the way it combines a narrative across the entire energy spectrum into a single volume.

A revised reprint edition of the book was issued on September 26, 2012.

== Content ==
The Quest is divided into six sections: "The New World of Oil", the first section focuses on developments worldwide in the oil industry following the first Gulf War and the breakup of the Soviet Union. It is noteworthy that The Quest has two chapters devoted to China, the only country to get such treatment in the book, whereas The Prize talked very little about China. The second section, "Securing the Supply", covers the ways in which concerns over energy security and scarcity have shaped the world's economy, policies, and planning. This section tells the story of how shale gas was developed. "The Electric Age", the third section, follows electricity's rise, as well as the risks of nuclear proliferation, hurdles faced in ensuring that "the lights stay on" and the current challenges for fuel choice.

The fourth section, "Climate and Carbon", lays out in six chapters the history of climate science from the "discovery" of the atmosphere in the late 18th century and of the "ice age" in the early 19th century to its current central role in energy policy and debate. "New Energies", the fifth section, focuses on the "rebirth of renewables" and the role of energy efficiency. The final section, "The Road to the Future" describes the evolution of personal mobility and the growing global demand for automobiles. Yergin covers the topics of third and fourth generation biofuels, hydrogen fuel cells, natural gas vehicles, and what he calls "round two in the race between gasoline and the electric car." The book concludes with a discussion of the impact of the "globalization of innovation" on future energy supplies.

== Reception ==
Reception of The Quest has been generally positive, with Asahi Shimbun naming it as a "Book of the Year". Praise for the book has predominantly centered on Yergin's coverage of the energy system, with The New York Times referring to the book as "necessary reading" and The Economist calling it a "comprehensive guide to the world's great energy needs and dilemmas".

Critiques of The Quest most often fall into three main categories. Some critics commented on the book's 800 page length, noting that it was not necessarily for the casual reader and that it felt like several different books in one. Others faulted Yergin for his impartiality and not taking a strong position on subjects such as climate change, although The Wall Street Journal said that the book succumbed to "the conventional alarmist storyline" on climate. Finally, peak oil advocates take strong issue with Yergin's handling of the subject in the book, particularly the discussion of the founding of the peak theory and the potential for future oil discoveries.
