= Upstream capital costs index =

The upstream capital costs index (UCCI), formally known as IHS/CERA upstream capital costs index, is a proprietary index of the rate of inflation seen in the costs associated with the construction of a global portfolio of 28 upstream oil and gas projects. The UCCI is managed and released by Cambridge Energy Research Associates. Updates are posted May and November of each year.

The counterpart of UCCI is UOCI - IHS CERA Upstream Operating Costs Index, which measures operating costs for upstream oil and gas facilities.
