= Oxford Institute for Energy Studies =

Recognised independent centre of Oxford University

The Oxford Institute for Energy Studies, founded in 1982, is an independent energy research institute, based in Oxford.

Their stated aim is to undertake advanced research on issues currently affecting the world’s energy sector, and to help inform the public debate and improve understanding of the political economy of energy, energy policy and the energy transition.

== Research and publications ==
The Oxford Institute for Energy Studies research is structured into seven research programmes: Oil, Gas, Electricity, Carbon Management, China Energy, Hydrogen, and Energy Transition.

The research fellows at the Oxford Institute for Energy Studies are frequently quoted across international media outlets.

== Funding ==
The Institute receives funding from a variety of government institutions and energy companies such as Saudi Aramco, Shell plc, TotalEnergies, ExxonMobil and BP.

== Awards ==
Oxford Institute for Energy Studies has consistently been recognized as one of the top Think Tanks in the world for Energy and Resource Policy in the TTCSP GLOBAL GO TO THINK TANK IDEX REPORTS

Year	Rank	Category
2020	1st	Energy and Resource Policy Think Tanks
2019	3rd	Energy and Resource Policy Think Tanks
2018	3rd	Energy and Resource Policy Think Tanks
2017	3rd	Energy and Resource Policy Think Tanks
2016	4th	Energy and Resource Policy Think Tanks
