= CERAWeek =

Annual energy, technology, and geopolitics conference

CERAWeek by S&P Global
- Date: Annually, since 1983
- Location: Houston, Texas, U.S.
- Website: ceraweek.com

CERAWeek is an annual conference for the energy industry held in Houston, Texas. Organized by S&P Global, the event gathers executives, government officials, and leaders from the energy, technology, and financial sectors. It was founded in 1983 by Daniel Yergin and James Rosenfield as the executive conference for their firm, Cambridge Energy Research Associates (CERA).

The conference program addresses topics such as energy markets, geopolitics, climate change, and technological innovation. It consists of two main, concurrent programs: the Executive Conference and the Innovation Agora, the latter of which was introduced in 2017 to focus on emerging technologies. Several media outlets such as Financial Times, Politico, and CNBC have commented on the event’s prominence within the energy sector.

== Speakers and Attendees ==
CERAWeek attracts executives, government officials and thought leaders from the energy, policy, technology, and financial industries to Houston each year. In 2019, there were over 5,500 delegates from over 1,000 organizations representing 85 countries. These include over 650 CEOs and Chairmen, over 1,400 C-Suite executives and over 90 ministers and government representatives. Participants encompass all regions and industry segments: oil, natural gas, electric power, coal, nuclear and renewables; as well as technology, finance, mobility and more. Over the years, CERAWeek has hosted a range of high‑level participants, including heads of state, government officials, and executives from the global energy and technology industries.

== CERAWeek’s Energy Innovation Pioneers ==
Each year at CERAWeek, the Energy Innovation Pioneer program recognizes companies and entrepreneurs whose technologies and business plans have the potential to transform the energy industry's future. Companies are selected based on several criteria, including the feasibility of their plan and scalability of their technology, and are presented at an Energy Insight Breakfast session during the conference. In 2019, CERAWeek recognized 8 pioneers. In 2014, CERAWeek recognized 24 pioneers.

== Media Coverage ==
CERAWeek has been widely covered by the media, including the following news outlets: The Wall Street Journal, The New York Times, Business Week, and Forbes.
