= Ucci (surname) =

Ucci is a surname. Notable people with the surname include:

- Kartz Ucci (1961–2013), Canadian artist and educator
- Stephen Ucci (born 1971), American politician
- Toni Ucci (1922–2014), Italian actor and comedian
