= Energy Markets Emergency Act of 2008 =

The Energy Markets Emergency Act of 2008 (H.R. 6377) was a bill in the 110th Congress that "directs the Commodity Futures Trading Commission to use its authority to deal with issues causing major market disturbances." More specifically, the legislation directed the Commodity Futures Trading Commission to utilize all its authority, including its emergency powers, to curb immediately excessive speculation, price distortion, sudden or unreasonable fluctuations or unwarranted changes in prices, or other unlawful activity that is allegedly causing major market disturbances that prevent the market from accurately reflecting the forces of supply and demand for commodities.

== Not passed ==
The bill was passed in the House. But in the Senate, sixty "yes" votes were required for the July 25, 2008 cloture motion to be successful, but the measure received only 50 "yes" votes with 43 lawmakers opposed. Senate Democrats said the legislation was needed to give the government new powers to curb alleged speculators, whom some lawmakers accuse of being behind the run-up in crude oil and gasoline prices. However, Senate Republicans strongly opposed the bill, arguing the legislation should be modified to also boost U.S. oil production by allowing more offshore drilling and developing vast oil shale fields in the West.
