= Bioasphalt =

Petroleum-free asphalt alternative from renewable inputs

Bioasphalt is an asphalt alternative made from non-petroleum based renewable resources.

These sources include sugar, molasses and rice, corn and potato starches, natural tree and gum resins, natural latex rubber and vegetable oils, lignin, cellulose, palm oil waste, coconut waste, peanut oil waste, canola oil waste, dried sewerage effluent and so on. Bitumen can also be made from waste vacuum tower bottoms produced in the process of cleaning used motor oils, which are normally burned or dumped into land fills.

Non-petroleum based bitumen binders can be colored, which can reduce the temperatures of road surfaces and reduce the Urban heat islands.

== Petroleum, environmental, and heat concerns ==
Because of concerns over Peak oil, pollution and climate change, as well the oil price increases since 2003, non-petroleum alternatives have become more popular. This has led to the introduction of biobitumen alternatives that are more environmentally friendly and nontoxic.

For millions of people living in and around cities, heat islands are of growing concern. This phenomenon describes urban and suburban temperatures that are 1 to 6 °C (1.8 to 10.8 °F) hotter than nearby rural areas. Elevated temperatures can impact communities by increasing peak energy demand, air conditioning costs, air pollution levels, and heat-related illness and mortality. There are common-sense measures that communities can take to reduce the negative effects of heat islands, such as replacing conventional black asphalt road surfaces with the new pigmentable bitumen that gives lighter colors.

== History and implementation ==
Asphalt made with vegetable oil based binders was patented by Colas SA in France in 2004.

A number of homeowners seeking an environmentally friendly alternative to asphalt for paving have experimented with waste vegetable oil as a binder for driveways and parking areas in single-family applications. The earliest known test occurred in 2002 in Ohio, where the homeowner combined waste vegetable oil with dry aggregate to create a low-cost and less polluting paving material for his 200-foot driveway. After five years, he reports the driveway is performing as well or better than petroleum-based materials.

Shell Oil Company paved two public roads in Norway in 2007 with vegetable-oil-based asphalt. Results of this study are still premature.

HALIK Asphalts LTD from Israel has been experimenting with recycled and secondary road building since 2003. The company is using various wastes such as vegetable fats & oils, wax and thermoplastic elastomers to build and repair roads. The results reported are so far satisfying.

On October 6, 2010, a bicycle path in Des Moines, Iowa, was paved with bio-oil based asphalt through a partnership between Iowa State University, the City of Des Moines, and Avello Bioenergy Inc. Research is being conducted on the asphalt mixture, derived from plants and trees to replace petroleum-based mixes. Bioasphalt is a registered trademark of Avello Bioenergy Inc.

Dr. Elham H. Fini, at North Carolina A&T University, has been spearheading research that has successfully produced bio asphalt from swine manure.

Since November 2014 the Dutch Wageningen University & Research centre is running a pilot in the Dutch province of Zeeland with bioasphalt in which the binder of bitumen was substituted by lignin.

In 2015, French researchers published their results about the usage of microalgaes as a source of asphalt binding material.

== See also ==
- Asphalt
