= U.S.–Russia Business Council =

The U.S.–Russia Business Council (USRBC) is a Washington, D.C.–based trade association that represents the interests of 300 member companies with operations in the Russian market. The Council's mission is to expand the U.S.–Russian commercial relationship. Guided by member interests, the Council lobbies for an economic environment in which businesses can succeed in a challenging Russian market. It contributes to the stability and development of a free market in Russia and supports its integration into the global economy.

== Membership ==
There are nearly 200 members, including Alfa-Bank, Boeing, Cargill, Citigroup, Coca-Cola, Ford Motor Company, Lukoil, Procter & Gamble, and other leading businesses, banks, law firms, accounting firms and organizations.

In March 2022, after the Russian invasion of Ukraine, Politico reported that the U.S.–Russia Business Council had quietly removed two sanctioned Russian financial institutions, VEB.RF and VTB Bank, from its list of members on its website, while despite sanctions Sberbank and Gazprombank retained their memberships and Sberbank's CEO still sat on the Council's board; the Council then blocked the ability of the public to view its members, Board of Directors, and Executive Committee.

== Activities ==
The USRBC provides business development, dispute resolution, government relations, and market intelligence services to its American and Russian member companies. Though some activities and research are reserved for paying members, the USRBC provides a variety of resources for those interested in Russia's business environment and the overall economy.

== Leadership ==
Daniel Russell was appointed President and CEO of the USRBC in July 2013. The Board of Directors is chaired by Mark Sutton, Chairman and CEO of International Paper and consists of C-suite executives from companies invested in the bilateral relationship and leading Russia experts.
