= United States Energy Association =

Nonpartisan energy organization

- Formation: 1924
- Purpose: International Development, Energy Education
- Location: Washington D.C.
- President & CEO: Mark W. Menezes
- Revenue: (2016)
- Website: www.usea.org

The United States Energy Association (USEA) is an association of public and private energy-related organizations, corporations, nonprofits, educational institutions, think tanks and government agencies. USEA works with the U. S. Department of Energy, U.S. Department of State and the U.S. Agency for International Development (USAID) to make energy accessible throughout the world by focusing on the viability of electricity, coal, oil, gas, nuclear and renewables. The organization also serves as a resource for the domestic and global energy industry, hosting a variety of events year-round that inform on current energy policy, challenges and technologies. Through its member organizations, USEA shares energy best practices, executes projects, and coordinates research domestically and internationally.

The United States Energy Award was established in 1989 to recognize preeminent energy leadership and contributions to international understanding of energy issues.

== Leadership ==
The United States Energy Association Board of Directors appointed Mark W. Menezes as its new President and Chief Executive Officer effective June 15, 2023.

Vicky Bailey is the Executive Chairman of USEA's board of directors.

== Briefings and Forums ==
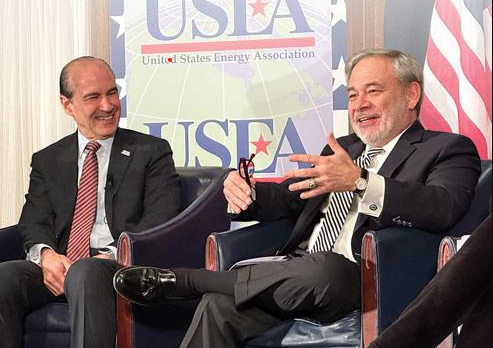
USEA President & CEO, Mark W. Menezes, and EEI CEO, Dan Brouillette, at the United States Energy Association's State of the Energy Industry Forum.

The association gathers industry leaders to provide virtual press briefings, webinars, forums and events, serving as a resource and educator for the domestic and international energy industry.

USEA offers virtual press briefings covering important topics in the Energy Industry. These briefings bring together industry experts, news outlets and the general public to discuss topics such as Green Hydrogen, the Texas Deep Freeze, the Impact of 5G Networks on Electric Utilities and others.

The association has held webinars on Cybersecurity, Carbon Capture and Storage, Distributed Energy Resources, and Grid Modernization.

Forums include the Annual State of the Energy Industry Forum, Annual Membership Meeting and Public Policy Forum, Energy Supply Forum, and Advanced Energy Technology Forum.

== Programs and International Work ==
USEA has been a partner with USAID since 1991, expanding energy infrastructure, improving energy access, and reducing energy poverty in developing economies through international energy partnerships. Their work together includes the Energy Utility Partnership Program, the Energy Technology and Governance Program, the South Asia Regional Energy Hub (SAREH), and the U.S.-East Africa Geothermal Partnership (EAGP).

=== Energy Utility Partnership Program ===
EUPP’s focus is on helping developing countries increase environmentally sustainable energy production and improve their utilities. Different programs are funded through the partnership, such as the U.S. government’s Power Africa initiative, which offers policy, financial, and technical assistance to African countries. USEA makes EUPP available to all USAID-assisted countries and USAID Missions.

=== Energy Technology and Governance Program ===
ETAG is a joint-effort to enhance the energy security of Europe and Eurasia. The program focuses on improving and growing the engineering skills and institutional capacity of the region’s energy sector.

One of the projects under the ETAG is the Black Sea Regional Transmission Planning Project (BSTP). Established in 2004, this program provides training, analysis and infrastructure project support to electric transmission system operators of Armenia, Bulgaria, Georgia, Moldova, Romania, Turkey, and Ukraine. In 2021, its models and training were being used to help Ukraine and Moldova diversify its energy systems and resources.

=== South Asia Regional Energy Hub ===
In October 2020, the South Asia Regional Energy Hub (SAREH) was created to share results from its Asia EDGE initiative. This partnership provides a platform for the private sector to share knowledge and coordinate opportunities for collaboration with policy makers and regulators in South Asia.

=== U.S.-East Africa Geothermal Partnership ===
In 2012, the association launched the U.S.-East Africa Geothermal Partnership (EAGP), a public-private partnership “offering assistance at early stages of project development in East Africa.” Through the Djibouti Geothermal Partnership, Ethiopia Geothermal Partnership, and Kenya Electricity Generating Company (KenGen), USEA partners with the Department of Energy and local governments to promote U.S. companies’ involvement in developing additional geothermal generation capacity. In December 2020, USEA and USAID released the EAGP Webinar Series on geothermal industrial parks.

=== Promoting Consensus on CCUS and Carbon Management Technologies ===
In 2020, USEA released a report on the current state of Carbon Capture, Utilization and Storage (CCUS). The report analyzed the various federal and state tax incentives that can be utilized to make large-scale CCUS adoption and deployment possible, including the benefits that exist through the Section 45Q federal tax credit.

=== Other partnerships ===
In June 2020, USEA partnered with London Economics International (LEI) and Grid Advisors LLC to develop a strategy to help Uganda improve its grid reliability and increase renewable capacity. In March 2021, the partners published an Energy Mix Diversification Strategy for the Uganda Electricity Generation Company Limited (UEGCL).
