= Cambridge Energy Research Associates =

American consulting company

Cambridge Energy Research Associates (CERA) is a consulting company in the United States that specializes in advising governments and private companies on energy markets, geopolitics, industry trends, and strategy. CERA has research and consulting staff across the globe and covers the oil, gas, power, and coal markets worldwide.

The company was founded in 1983 by Pulitzer Prize winning author Daniel Yergin, James Rosenfield and Joseph Stanislaw. Comprising experts from many fields within the energy industry, CERA was acquired by IHS Energy in 2004. In 2009 it modified its name to IHS Cambridge Energy Research Associates (IHS CERA) as part of the IHS brand integration in which name changes also took place for other endorsed brands under IHS, including IHS Jane's, IHS Global Insight, IHS EViews, and IHS Herold.

S&P Global acquired IHS, and CERA is now part of S&P Global Energy.

== CERAWeek ==
Some of the company's largest clients include international energy companies, energy consumers, governments, utilities, technology companies, and financial institutions. Many of them attend "CERAWeek", the company's annual conference held at the Hilton Americas Hotel in Houston, Texas. Daily programs usually revolve around the topics of oil, natural gas, electric power, renewables, and technology.

Past keynote speeches have been given by the energy secretaries and ministers of Saudi Arabia, Iraq, Mexico, Norway, and the United States. Other notable speakers have included former United States Secretary of the Treasury Robert Rubin, United States Secretary of Energy Samuel Bodman, former Colorado Senator Gary Hart; former United States Secretary of Commerce Donald L. Evans; former Federal Reserve Chairman Alan Greenspan, Microsoft CEO Steve Ballmer, and former Secretary General of OPEC Rilwanu Lukman.

CERA also manages the Upstream Capital Costs Index.

== Peak oil ==
As the controversy over peak oil intensified in 2006, CERA found itself on the optimistic side of predictions, forecasting that a peak would not occur before 2030, and this would not be a "peak" but rather an "undulating plateau". This opinion has been met with criticism by those who believe a peak has already occurred or is imminent. ASPO-USA described CERA's position as having a credibility problem. Chris Skrebowski considered the CERA report to be a polemic that confused stocks and flows.

In June 2008, Daniel Yergin said that markets have helped fuel a "shortage psychology" that the world is "running out of oil". He also described $120–$150 per barrel as the "break point" for oil, the point where demand erosion would affect the price rise.

CERA researchers have predicted in September 2009 that peak demand has come and gone in the OECD world, likely sometime in 2005. This is not, however, in agreement with peak oil, which is more on the extraction and production side. CERA continues to believe that there is plenty of oil under ground. In predicting peak demand in developed countries, CERA states that long-term demand is softening as a result of demographic and socioeconomic changes in developed countries (such as the aging of OECD populations), improved transportation efficiency, and encroachment by substitutes such as biofuels and natural gas.

== Leadership ==
- Daniel Yergin, Chairman
- James Rosenfield, Co-Founder
