= Technocracy (disambiguation) =

Technocracy is a form of government by technicians; specifically: management of society by technical experts.

Technocracy or technocrat may also refer to:

- Technocracy movement, a social movement that started in the United States, advocating a post-scarcity society based on energy accounting
  - Technocracy Study Course, a book written by M. King Hubbert which forms the ideological basis for the Technocracy movement
- Technocracy, a band formed by Phil Demmel
- The technocratic paradigm, a reliance on technology's ability to resolve all problems, criticised by Pope Francis in his encyclical letter Laudato si'
- Technocracy (EP), a 1987 EP by the band Corrosion of Conformity
- Technocracy (Mage: The Ascension), or Technocratic Union, a worldwide conspiracy in the roleplaying game Mage: The Ascension
- Technocrat (character), a DC Comics character and former member of the Outsiders
- Technocratic government (Italy)
