= Fred Meissner =

American geologist and engineer

- Grand Canyon Field Trip
- Born: November 10, 1931; Denver
- Died: September 18, 2007 (aged 75)
- Education: Colorado School of Mines
- Awards: Sidney Powers Memorial Award
- Scientific career
- Fields: geology, geophysics, and engineering

Fred F. Meissner (November 10, 1931 – September 18, 2007) was an American geologist and engineer who contributed to the fields of geology, geophysics, engineering, petroleum engineering, geochemistry, mineralogy, physics, mining, economic geology, and fishing.

== Biography ==
Meissner was an honored exploration geologist, college professor at the Colorado School of Mines and consultant, and a pioneer of the concept that methane gas could be extracted from coal beds (see coal bed methane extraction). He was the 2008 recipient of the Sidney Powers Memorial Award. He also received the Grover Murray Distinguished Educator Award in 2005, the Mines Medal in 1997, and the distinguished service award in 1987.

As an independent petroleum geologist and consultant, Meissner developed exploration projects in the Rocky Mountains and other U.S. and foreign (Indonesia, Nigeria, Chile, Jordan) areas for sale and promotion to industry partners. He has consulted for a number of major and independent petroleum companies, both domestic and international.

As a Colorado School of Mines adjunct professor, Meissner taught advanced petroleum geology, a graduate level course, and was a guest or temporary replacement lecturer for courses taught by other professors. He was also a member of numerous graduate student committees.

From 1980 to 1991 Meissner was exploration manager at Bird Oil Corporation; he also served as exploration manager of the Rocky Mountain region for Standard Oil of Ohio (Sohio). During his career he was associated with Webb Resources, Filon Exploration Corporation, Trend Minerals Corporation, and Shell Oil Company.

Meissner held a number of leadership positions with the American Association of Petroleum Geologists (AAPG), which honored him with the A.L. Levorson Award for the Rocky Mountain Section in 1975. He is also a member of the Geological Society of America and was elected a fellow in 1988. He served as president of the Rocky Mountain Association of Geologists (RMAG) in 1997 and the organization named him Scientist of the Year in 1976 and presented him with the Distinguished Service Award in 1991. In 1986 he received the Distinguished Service Medal from Colorado School of Mines.

== Awards ==
The American Association of Petroleum Geologists (AAPG) awarded Meissner the A.L. Levorson Award for the Rocky Mountain Section in 1976, and awarded him an honorary AAPG membership in 2001. He was a member of the Geological Society of America and was elected a fellow in 1988. He was named Scientist of the Year by Rocky Mountain Association of Geologists (RMAG) in 1976, presented with the RMAG's Distinguished Service Award in 1991, served as president of RMAG in 1997, and is an honorary member. In 1986 he received a Distinguished Service Medal for career achievement from Colorado School of Mines and was awarded the Mines Medal for unusual and exemplary service to the School in 2000.

Meissner was active in the Freemasons at Corinthian Lodge #35 in Leadville, Colorado and was a 32 degree.

Meissner was a prolific technical writer and authored over 45 publications, papers, and poster sessions focusing primarily on hydrocarbon generation, migration and accumulation.

His 48 years of industry experience included 16 years with Shell Oil Company working the Permian Basin, Gulf Coast, Rocky Mountain and Mid-Continent Oil Province areas. He had over 20 years cumulative experience with several independents that “found oil and were sold” including Trend Exploration, Filon Exploration, Webb Resources, and Bird Oil. He was a principal in all, with professional responsibilities ranging from exploration manager to vice president.

After leaving Bird Oil in 1991 he has been an independent consultant and professor of geology at the Colorado School of Mines where he sat on thesis committees, taught a graduate course in Advanced Petroleum geology, and was a guest lecturer.

Self-described as an explorationist, he was recognized internationally for his expertise in understanding and predicting the behavior of petroleum systems, including aspects of hydrocarbon generation and migration, basin-wide hydrodynamics, abnormal pressure, and the occurrence of fractured reservoirs, especially as they relate to “basin-center” oil and gas accumulations.

His consultancy, Fred F. Meissner and Associates, undertook investigations for clients in several domestic U.S. areas as well as in West Africa, South America, Europe, Asia and Canada. He also provided public and private instruction on subsurface fluid pressures and their relation to patterns of petroleum generation, migration and accumulation worldwide, and taught several short courses for the Rocky Mountain Region of Petroleum Technology Transfer Council (PTTC).

== History ==
Meissner was born and raised in Denver, Colorado and graduated from South High School. Both of his parents were the first generation in their families that was not involved in the extraction of Western U.S. natural resources. It was here that his connection to the Rocky Mountains was cemented. He developed an interest in rocks and mining and attended the Colorado School of Mines, graduating with the degree in Geological Engineering in 1953. He was an ROTC cadet at Mines and received a commission upon graduation, but deferred his call to Korean War era service for one year in order to complete his master's degree, graduating in 1954, the year he joined AAPG. Funded by a Shell fellowship, his master's thesis concerned the geology of the Doctor Mine, a lead zinc replacement deposit in the Leadville Limestone, in Gunnison County, Colorado.

After completing a tour of duty with the United States Army Corps of Engineers in 1956 he began his professional career with Shell Oil Company, where he worked for the next 17 years. While enrolled in Advanced Petroleum Geology as a graduate student (a course Meissner taught at Mines), he studied the hydrodynamic work of Dr. M. King Hubbert and recognized it as a key to certain aspects of petroleum migration and trapping. While at Shell Oil Company he worked with a number of leading petroleum explorationists and, notably, with M. King Hubbert, acknowledged by Meissner as his mentor.

While with Shell he was able to apply hydrodynamic concepts to the occurrence of oil accumulations in deep-water turbidite channels that he identified and mapped in the Delaware Basin of West Texas and southeastern New Mexico. Recognizing the presence and potential of tilted oil water contacts in the turbidities, he presented his ideas to management. The manager derided them, refusing to recognize that water contacts could be anything other than horizontal. Shortly after this, the manager retired and Shell brought in a new manager that recognized the potential of the concept and encouraged Meissner to pursue his ideas. As a result, he developed several prospects, three of which subsequently “found oil fields.”

In recognition of Meissner's potential, in 1965 he was transferred to Shell Development Company in Houston where he conducted basic research on hydrocarbon origin, migration and accumulation. In Houston Meissner refined his understanding of the fundamental controls on the existence of petroleum systems. This evolved into a macro-framework understanding of hydrocarbon systems produced as a result of source rock maturity and the existence of fluid potential energy fields in a basin. This has provided a key to understanding the creation of overpressured and underpressured “basin centered” or “deep basin” oil and gas accumulations currently being exploited in the Rockies.

== Bibliography ==
Meissner was a prolific technical writer and authored over 45 publications and papers focusing primarily on hydrocarbon generation, migration and accumulation.

=== Non-fiction ===
See also: Fred F. Meissner, Fred Franke Meissner

- Meissner, F. F., 2002, Experiences of a Petroleum Hydrogeologist, in, Introduction to Hydrogeology by David Deming, pp. 330–331: McGraw-Hill Higher Education, New York.
- Fred Meissner. An Epsomite Occurrence in the Tintic District, Utah, Rocks & Minerals Magazine, 1950, Rocks & Minerals Magazine, 1950. Pages 132–134,
- Walter Dean, Edward Dolly, Robert McDonald, and Fred Meissner. Oil and gas from fractured shale reservoirs in Colorado and northwest New Mexico,1978
- Fred F. Meissner. Causes of Anomalous Deep Basin Fluid Pressure in Rocky Mountain Basins and their Relation to Regional Gas Accumulation, 2000
- Woodward, Jane, Fred F. Meissner, and Jerry L. Clayton. Hydrocarbon Source Rocks of the Greater Rocky Mountain Region. Denver, Colo: Rocky Mountain Association of Geologists, 1984.
- Thomasson, M. R., & Meissner, F. F. (2001). Exploration & Development – Rocky Mountain Giants-1: Rockies dominates US onshore in 'discovery' of 1990s giants. The Oil and Gas Journal. 99, 44.
- Thomasson, M. R., & Meissner, F. F. (2001). Exploration & Development – Rocky Mountain Giants-2: US Rockies 'discoveries': Analogs for the future. The Oil and Gas Journal. 99, 44.
- AAPG Convention, Warme, J. E., Meissner, F. F., & Chamberlain, A. (1994). Field trip guidebook trip #16, RMAG : petroleum geology and sequence stratigraphy of Devonian carbonates of eastern Nevada, and the catastrophic Alamo Breccia. [Denver?], AAPG Annual Convention.
- Meissner, F.F., 1987, Mechanisms and patterns of gas generation/ storage/ expulsion-migration/accumulation associated with coal measures in the Green River and San Juan Basins, Rocky Mountain Region, U.S.A., in Doligez, B., ed., Migration of hydrocarbons in sedimentary basins, 2nd IFP Exploration Research Conf., Carcais France, June 15–19, 1987: Editions Technip, Paris, pp. 79–112.
- Thomasson, M.R. and Meissner, F., 2002, Rocky mountain giants: Rockies region dominates US in the 'discovery' of 1990s giant fields; Houston Geological Society Bulletin, Volume 45, No. 4, December 2002. Pages 43–50.

=== Academic and other works ===
- Fred F. Meissner and Richard B. Banks. Computer Simulation of Hydrocarbon Generation, Migration, and Accumulation under Hydrodynamic Conditions—Examples from the Williston and San Juan Basins, USA*, Search and Discovery Article #40179 November 10, 2005
- Why There is so Much Gas in The Rockies & Where Future Supplies Will be Found , Society of Independent Professional Earth Scientists (SIPES) Newsletter, February 2004
- Fred Meissner. Relation of Fractures to Fluid Pressure and Hydrocarbon Generation, Migration and Accumulation", "WeimerFest” Symposium 3 – 5 November 2004 Petroleum Hall, Green Center, Colorado School of Mines Technical and Social Program
- AAPG Hedberg Conference, Fred F. Meissner. Petroleum Systems Related to Source Rocks in the Mississippian Antler Foredeep of Eastern Nevada and Western Utah—Emphasis on Source Rocks, Oil Generation, Migration, Entrapment and Timing, AAPG Hedberg Conference "Late Paleozoic Tectonics and Hydrocarbon Systems of Western North America-The Greater Ancestral Rocky Mountains" July 21–26, 2002, Vail, Colorado
