= Holznot =

Supply crisis of wood

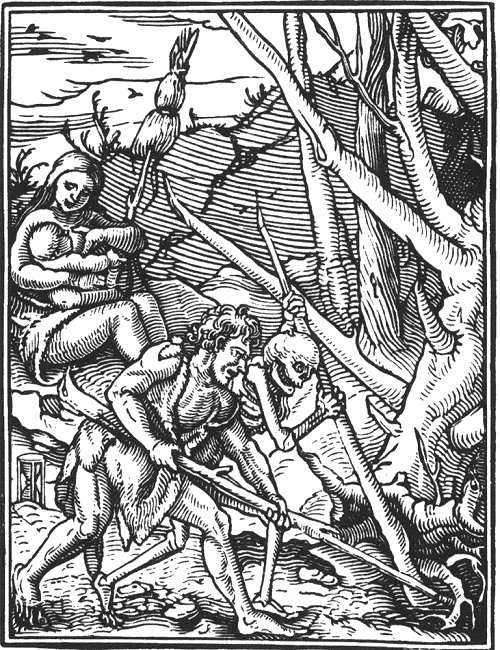
Deforestation as part of the "Danse Macabre" (1538) by Hans Holbein the Younger

Holznot (German for wood crisis) is a historic term for an existing or imminent supply crisis of wood.

== Historical use ==
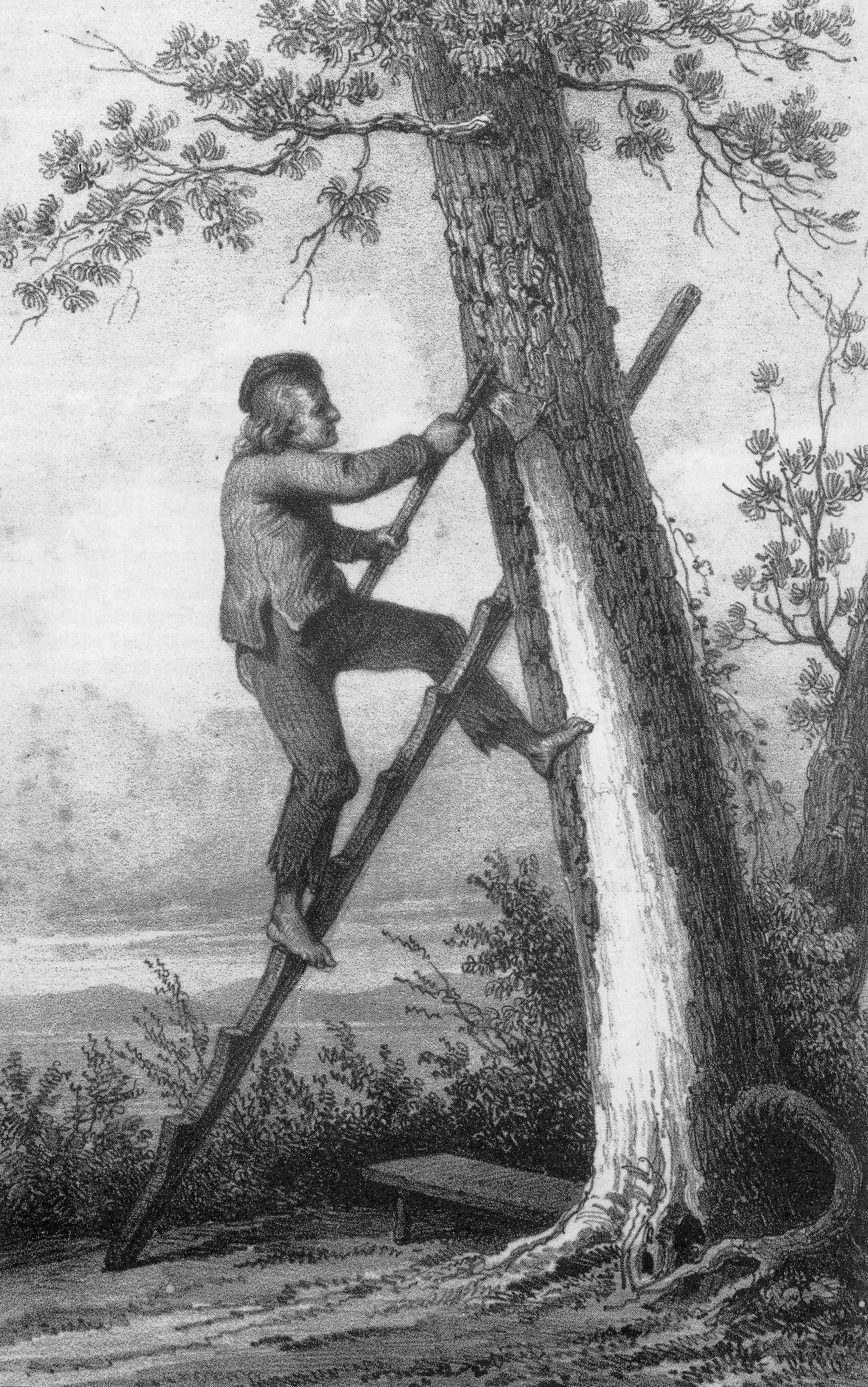
Resin workers were seen as outdated and damaging to modern forestry.

In particular, the concept was applied to Central Europe around the end of the 16th century until the start of the early 19th century in numerous sources. In almost all German-speaking regions, a wood shortage and resulting wood-saving measures became an important topic. Forestry and history scholars did not dispute the wood shortage per se for a long time. Besides the tragedy of the commons legend, the alleged Holznot was critical to motivate the shift from forest use as part of subsistence agriculture to modern professional forestry and was an important base of the development of modern forestry science around 1800. Around the 1980s, environmental historian Joachim Radkau began raising doubts about the alleged 18th-century wood shortage started a research controversy among German historians, called the "Holznotdebatte". Radkau debated e.g. with Rolf Peter Sieferle about the existence, extent, and spatial and social impact of perceived or real existing wood shortages and the associated ideological and economic background. Radkau doubted the Holznot had existed at all. Similar as with the tragedy of the commons he saw a strong ideological motive to get rid of the traditional farmers' forest access.

Radkau repeats Werner Sombart's notion of the pre-industrial phase as a "Wooden Age", where wood constituted the key substance for fuel energy, construction and machinery. While Sombart was positive about the change to an "iron age", Radkau is critical about the alleged decline of "wooden civilisation". Before the industrial century, the "wood brake", as he names it, was a component of stability, of the ecology and the traditional economic and social order. In connection with the first medieval mining rushes in the Ore Mountains ("Berggeschrey") regional wood shortages gave rise to the first use of sustainability in German forestry.

However, the situation began to change in the 16th century, as meeting point of the capitalist expansion and the formation of the absolutist state. From the 16th century, world maritime trade, housing construction in Europe, and the mountain mining industry brought a sharp rise in timber consumption. The absolutist state asked for a new order of the use of forests and area property rights at the expense of livestock grazing and traditional forest use, as in resin extraction. Complaints about wood shortages served, according Radkau, to legitimate state intervention and to exclude traditional groups of users such as resin workers and wood pasture in favour of more profitable timber consumers.

== Peak wood ==
The term peak wood refers to the point in time when the maximum rate of wood harvesting is reached. The term 'peak' refers to the Hubbert peak of a resource. Thus peak wood and peak oil cannot be compared directly. Unlike resources such as petroleum, which are destroyed in use, wood continually grows and is recycled, but it requires habitat (forests, woodland and timber plantations).

Author Steve Hallett argues in the 2011 book Life Without Oil that deforestation during the Roman period may have ultimately caused the fall of the Roman Empire. As wood had to be hauled from ever further away, Hallett suggests the law of diminishing returns undermined the economic performance of Roman industry, leaving Rome vulnerable to other, well documented problems of invasion and internal division. Hallett presents the history as a cautionary tale, drawing comparisons to contemporary society's potential fate following a peak oil scenario.
