= Hubbert curve =

Approximation of the production rate of a resource over time

The Hubbert curve is an approximation of the production rate of a resource over time. It is a symmetric logistic distribution curve, often confused with the "normal" gaussian function. It first appeared in "Nuclear Energy and the Fossil Fuels," geologist M. King Hubbert's 1956 presentation to the American Petroleum Institute, as an idealized symmetric curve, during his tenure at the Shell Oil Company. It has gained a high degree of popularity in the scientific community for predicting the depletion of various natural resources. The curve is the main component of Hubbert peak theory, which has led to the rise of peak oil concerns. Basing his calculations on the peak of oil well discovery in 1948, Hubbert used his model in 1956 to create a curve which predicted that oil production in the contiguous United States would peak around 1970.

== Shape ==
Plot of the Hubbert curve

The prototypical Hubbert curve is a probability density function of a logistic distribution curve. It is not a gaussian function (which is used to plot normal distributions), but the two have a similar appearance. The density of a Hubbert curve approaches zero more slowly than a gaussian function:

$$x = {e^{-t}\over(1+e^{-t})^2}={1\over2+2\cosh t}={1\over4}\operatorname{sech}^{2} {t\over2}.$$

The graph of a Hubbert curve consists of three key elements:

1. a gradual rise from zero resource production that then increases quickly
2. a "Hubbert peak", representing the maximum production level
3. a drop from the peak that then follows a steep production decline.

The actual shape of a graph of real world production trends is determined by various factors, such as development of enhanced production techniques, availability of competing resources, and government regulations on production or consumption. Because of such factors, real world Hubbert curves are often not symmetrical.

== Application ==
=== Peak oil ===
Using the curve, Hubbert modeled the rate of petroleum production for several regions, determined by the rate of new oil well discovery, and extrapolated a world production curve. The relative steepness of decline in this projection is the main concern in peak oil discussions. This is because a steep drop in the production implies that global oil production will decline so rapidly that the world will not have enough time to develop sources of energy to replace the energy now used from oil, possibly leading to drastic social and economic impacts.

=== Other resources ===
Hubbert models have been used to predict the production trends of various resources, such as natural gas (Hubbert's attempt in the late 1970s resulted in an inaccurate prediction that natural gas production would fall dramatically in the 1980s), Coal, fissionable materials, Helium, transition metals (such as copper), and water. At least one researcher has attempted to create a Hubbert curve for the whaling industry and caviar, while another applied it to cod.

=== Critique ===
After the predicted early-1970s peak of oil production in the U.S., production declined over the following 35 years in a pattern closely matching the Hubbert curve. However, new extraction methods began reversing this trend beginning in the mid-2000s decade, with production reaching 10.07 million b/d in November 2017 – the highest monthly level of crude oil production in U.S. history. As such, the Hubbert curve has to be calculated separately for different oil provinces, whose exploration has started at a different time, and oil extracted by new techniques, sometimes called unconventional oil, resulting in individual Hubbert cycles. The Hubbert Curve for US oil production is generally measured in years.

== See also ==
- Bioeconomics (biophysical)
- Energy accounting
- Gaussian function, a "bell curve" shape
- Thermoeconomics
