= Transport energy futures: long-term oil supply trends and projections =

Transport Energy Futures: Long-Term Oil Supply Trends and Projections is a report published by the Department of Infrastructure, Transport, Regional Development and Local Government, and prepared by the Bureau of Infrastructure, Transport and Regional Economics (BITRE) of Australia in 2009, which calculate peak oil to occur in 2017, after which oil supply is projected to decline rapidly. It is report number 117.

== Alleged cover-up ==
On 20 January 2012, an article in the Daily Telegraph of Australia reports that a French man had put the report on the internet, while there is no sign of it anywhere on the official webpages of BITRE. The author of the article accuses the government of purposely covering up the report from the public eye, while at the same time postulated that the report was sent to a number of European organisations, reasoning this was an explanation for the report being leaked.

== See also ==
- Peak Oil
- ASPO
- Hubbert Peak Theory
