= Peak gas =

Year when the maximum rate of gas production is reached

Peak gas is the point in time when the maximum global natural gas (fossil gas) production rate will be reached, after which the rate of production will enter its terminal decline. Although demand is peaking in the United States and Europe, it continues to rise globally due to consumers in Asia, especially China. Natural gas derived from fossil fuels is a non-renewable energy source that produces significant greenhouse gas emissions.

Natural gas is expected to peak after other fossil fuels. One forecast is for natural gas demand to peak in 2035.

The concept of peak gas follows from Hubbert peak theory, which is most commonly associated with peak oil. Hubbert saw gas, coal and oil as natural resources, each of which would peak in production and eventually run out for a region, a country, or the world.

== Gas demand ==
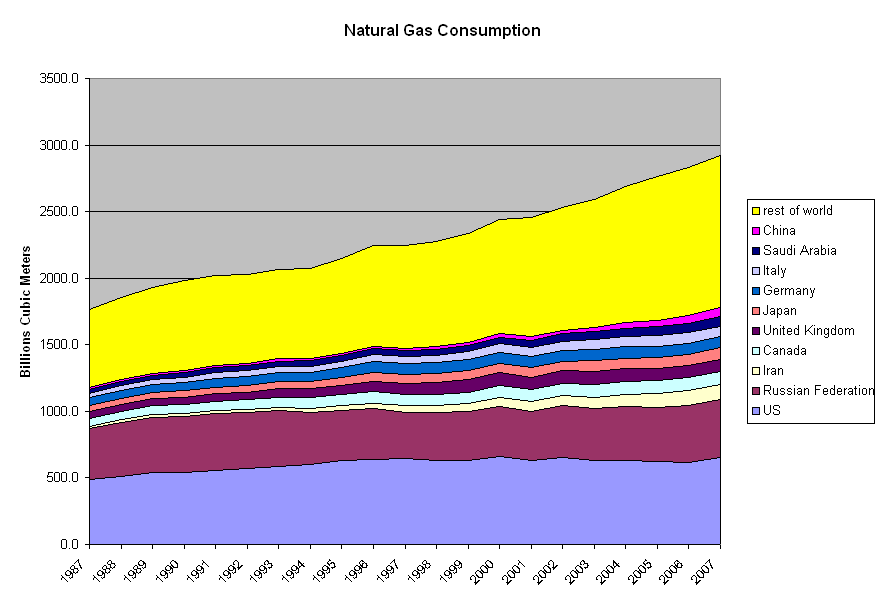
Natural gas consumption (billions of cubic meters)

The world gets almost one quarter of its energy from natural gas. The largest increments in future gas demand are expected to come from developing countries.

== Gas supply ==
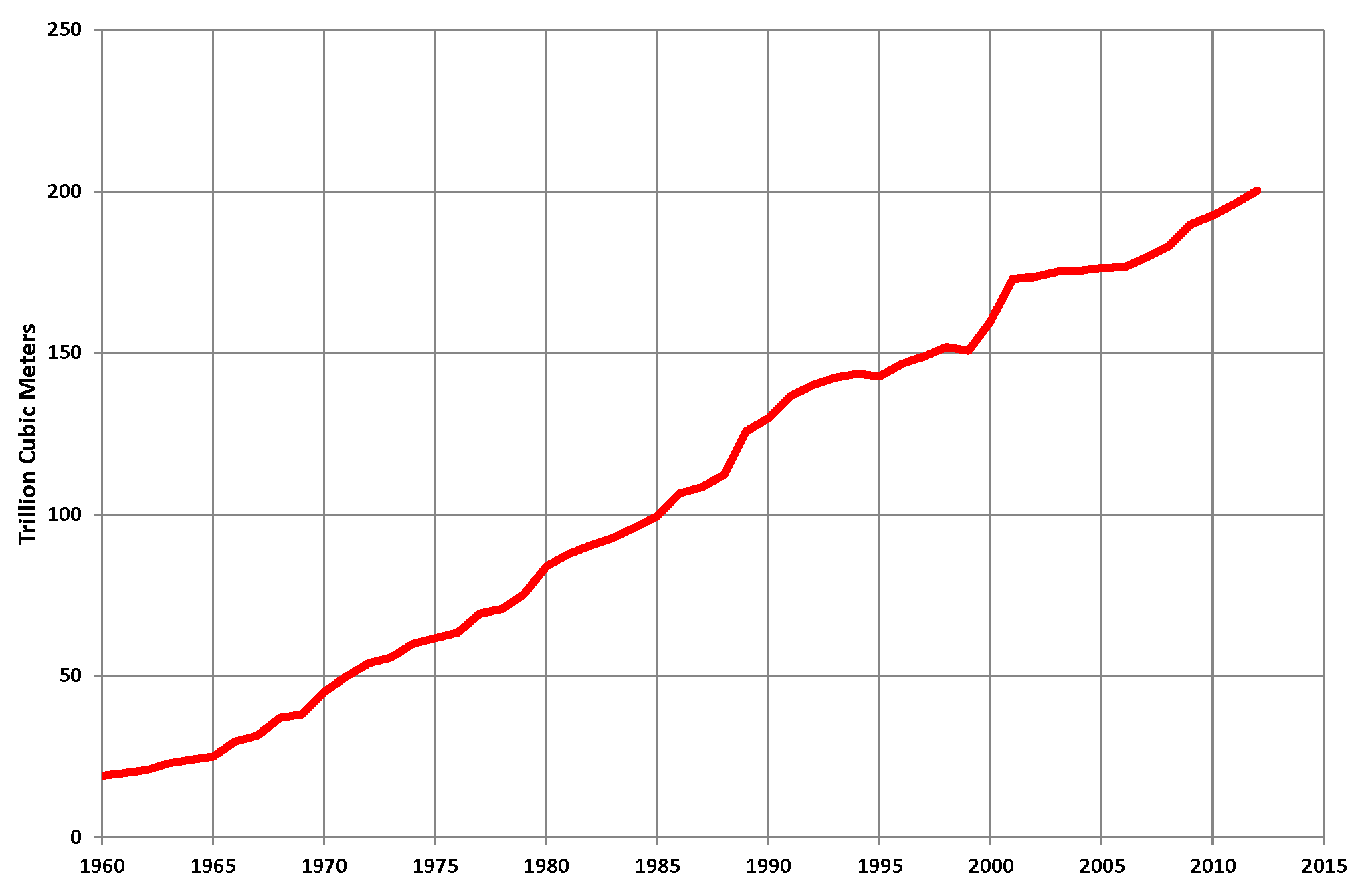
World natural gas proven reserves 1980–2011 (US EIA)

Hubbert's original peak theory predicts that natural gas will experience three equally spaced events: first, the rate of discoveries will peak, then X years later reserves will peak, and finally X years after peak reserves, gas production will peak at the same rate as the previous peak of discoveries. For the United States, for instance, Hubbert projected that the natural gas discovery rate was peaking in 1962 at about 570 billion cubic metres (20 trillion cubic feet) per year. From his curves, he predicted that proved reserves would peak eight years later, in 1970, and that production would peak after another eight years, in 1978, at 570 billion cubic metres (20 trillion cubic feet) per year, about equal to the rate of peak discoveries.

Of the three peaks, Hubbert found the peak in discoveries most difficult to define, because of large year-to-year scatter, and the phenomenon of “reserve growth.” Initial estimates of a discovery are usually much lower than ultimate recovery, especially if the conservative estimate of proven reserves is the measure. As the discovery is drilled out, estimates rise. Sometimes estimates of recoverable oil and gas in a discovery continue to rise for many years after the discovery. To find the peak in discoveries, Hubbert backdated reserve growth to the date of field discovery.

=== New gas discoveries ===
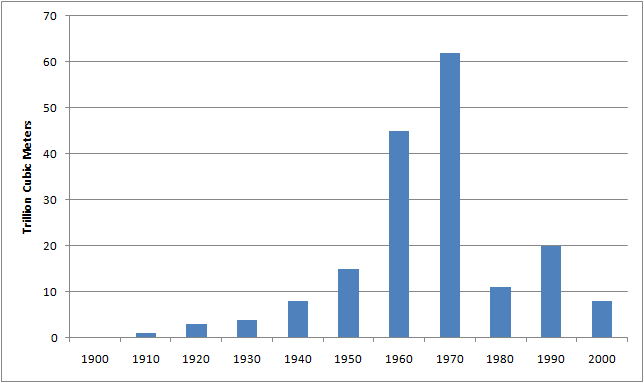
Natural gas discoveries by decade

According to David L. Goodstein, the worldwide rate of discovery peaked around 1960 and has been declining ever since. Exxon Mobil Vice President, Harry J. Longwell places the peak of global gas discovery around 1970 and has observed a sharp decline in natural gas discovery rates since then. The rate of discovery has fallen below the rate of consumption in 1980. The gap has been widening ever since. Declining gas discovery rates foreshadow future production decline rates because gas production can only follow gas discoveries.

Despite the reported fall in new-field discoveries, world proved reserves of natural gas have continued to grow, from 19 billion cubic meters (bcm) in 1960, 45 bcm in 1970 and 84 bcm in 1980, to a record high 200 bcm in 2012. A researcher for the US Energy Information Administration pointed out that after the first wave of discoveries in an area, most oil and natural gas reserve growth comes not from discoveries of new fields, but from extensions and additional gas found within existing fields.

Dr. Anthony Hayward CCMI, chief executive of BP stated in October 2009 that proven natural gas reserves around the world have risen to 190 cubic kilometres (1.2 trillion barrels) of oil equivalent, enough for 60 years' supply if consumption is non-increasing, and that gas reserves are trending upward. A similar situation exists with oil reserves in that they have increased despite the actual declines of worldwide discoveries for decades and despite increases in consumption. BP's former Chief Petroleum Engineer Jeremy Gilbert stated in 2007 that the growth in oil reserves "results largely from distortions created by the..reporting rules of the US Securities and Exchange Commission" that force companies to be overly conservative in their calculation of reserves, but that "even this illusory growth is unlikely to last," because fewer oil reserves are coming under the control of SEC-regulated companies. However, since Gilbert's statement, proven reserves of both oil and gas have continued to rise, proven oil reserves increasing 23%, from 1.20 trillion barrels in 2007, to 1.48 trillion barrels in 2012.

=== Production ===
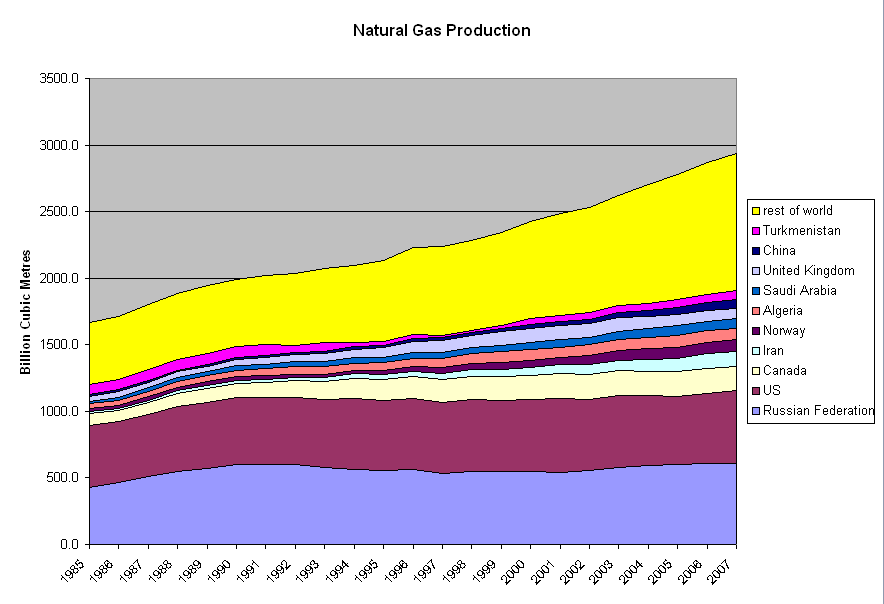
Natural gas production

=== Reserves ===
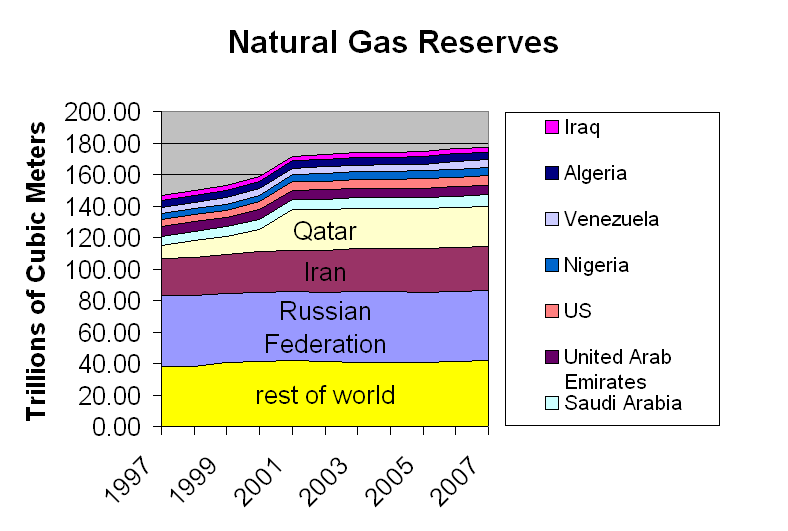
Natural gas reserves

== By country ==
=== Italy ===
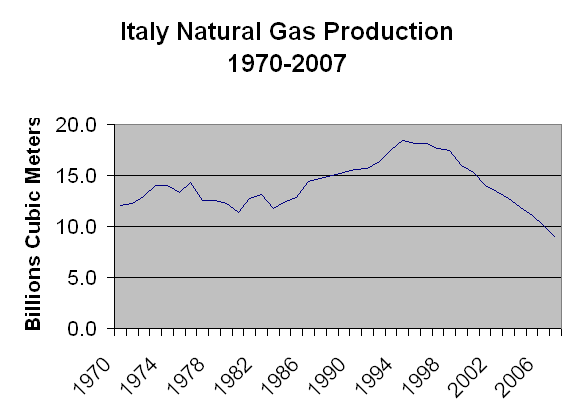
Italy gas production 1970–2007

Italy's gas consumption is presently third-highest in Europe, behind only Germany and the United Kingdom. Gas consumption is growing at a steady rate, and gas consumption in 2001 was 50% greater than it was in 1990.

Italy's major oil and gas company is Eni. Formerly state-owned, it was privatized during the 1990s, but the government still retains around one-third of the shares. Natural gas reserves in Italy were 164 billion m^{3} at the beginning of 2007. Natural gas production in 2005 was 11.5 billion m^{3}, while consumption was 82.6 billion m^{3}. The difference was imported. The primary sources of imported gas are Algeria, Russia and the Netherlands.

=== Netherlands ===
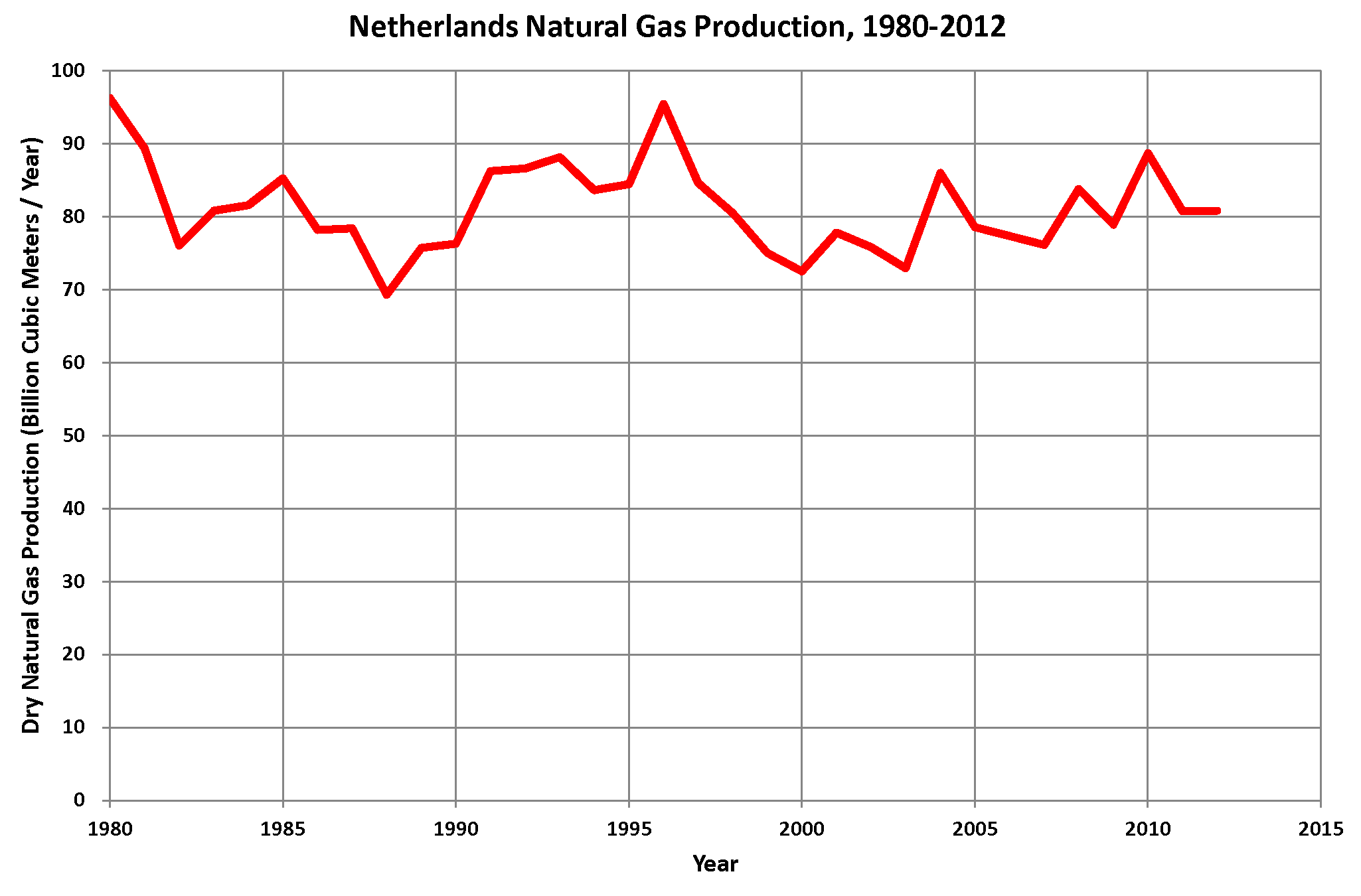
Natural gas production in the Netherlands

The Netherlands government has stated that peak gas occurred in 2007–2008 and the country will have become a net importer of natural gas by 2025.

=== Romania ===
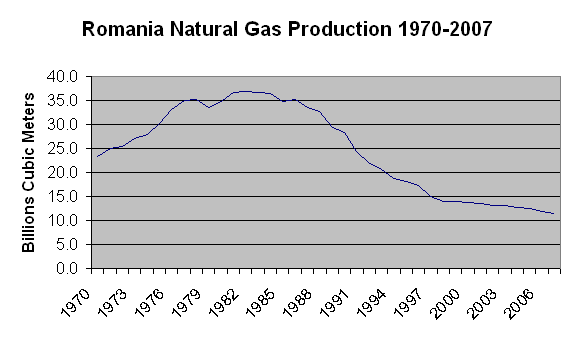
Romania gas production 1970–2007

Natural gas in Romania was discovered in 1909 in the Sărmăşel area. In 1917, Turda became the first European town lit up with natural gas. Maximum production of 29.8 billion m^{3} was achieved in 1976. Today, gas provides about 40% of the country's energy needs.

=== Russia ===
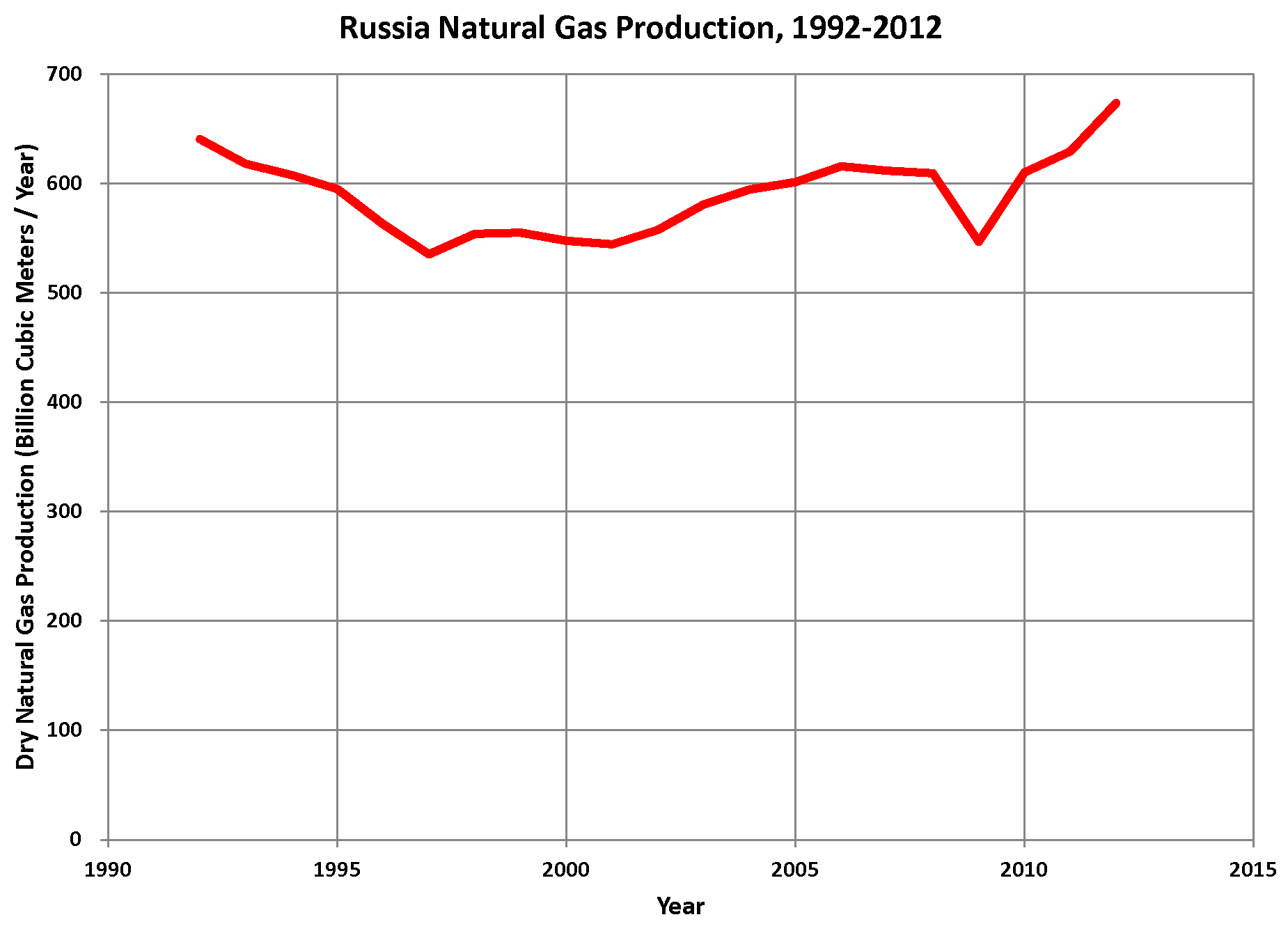
Natural gas production in Russia

Gazprom, Russia's state-controlled gas monopoly, is a firm which holds 25% of the world's gas reserves. Gazprom produces the bulk of Russia's gas.

=== United Kingdom ===
UK gas production, consumption, and net exports to 2015

UK gets its natural gas almost entirely from the North Sea. The North Sea gas field peaked in 2000 and has been falling quickly since. Production in 2004 was 12% down from the peak.

=== United States ===
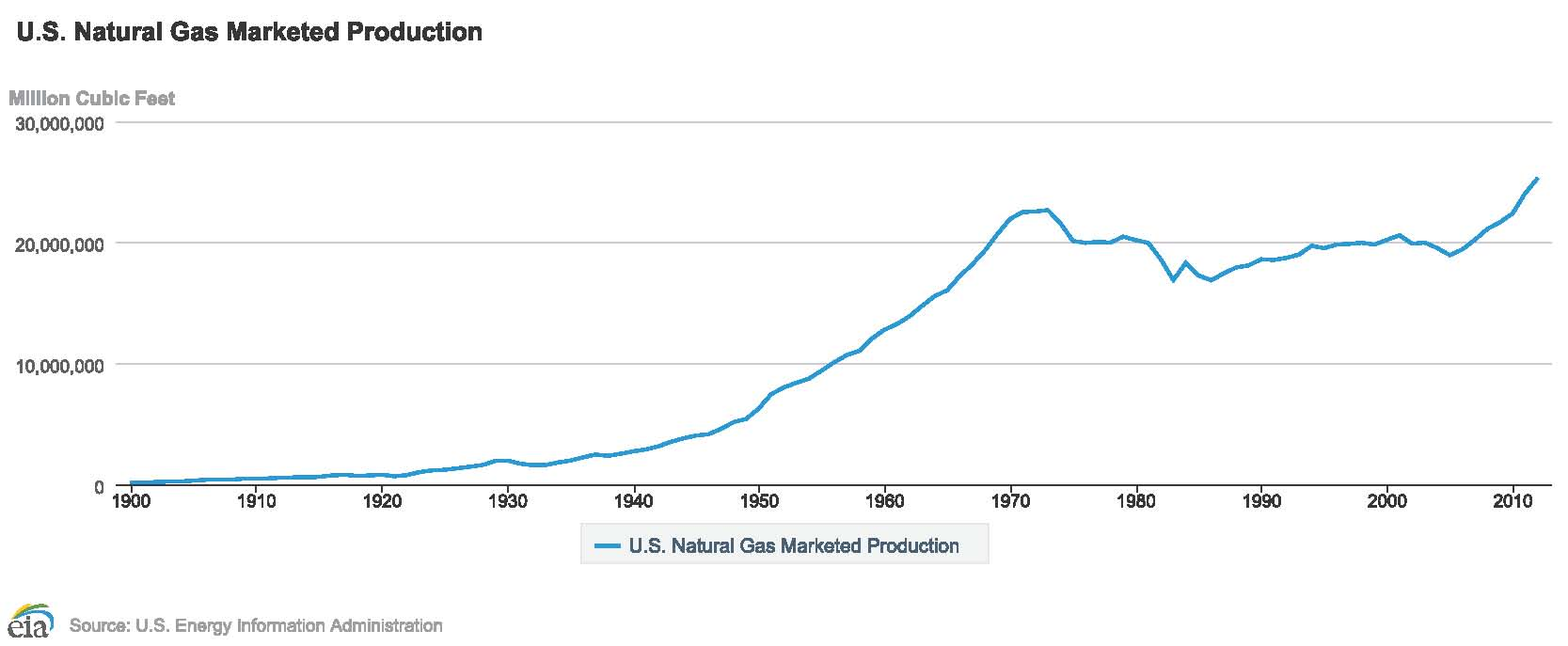
US gas production 1900–2012

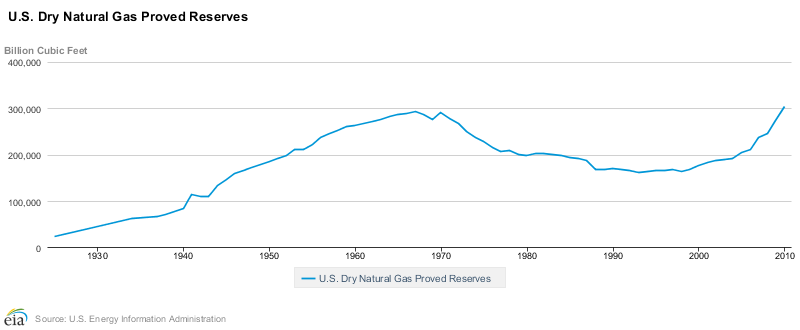
US proved reserves of natural gas 1925–2010

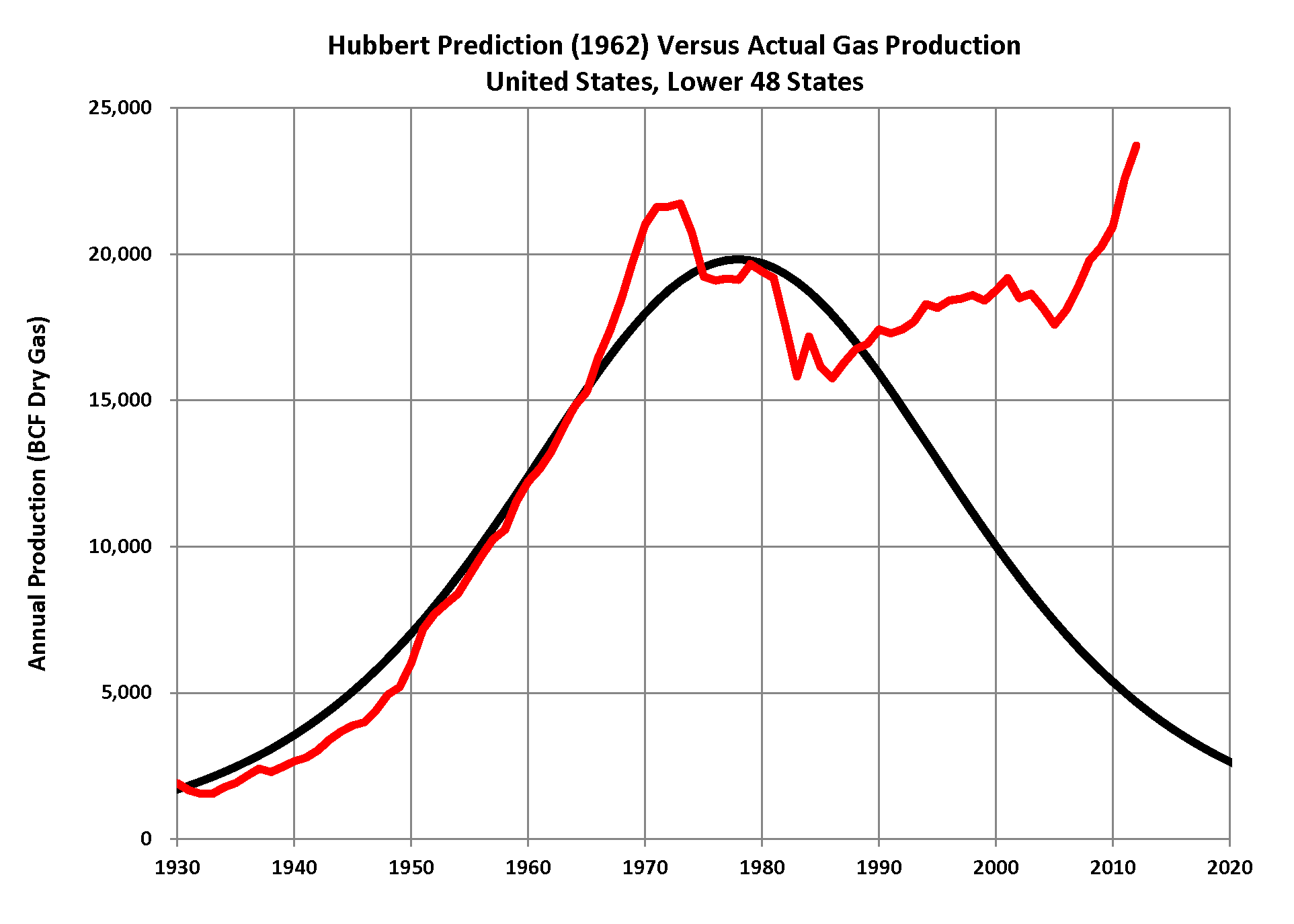
Hubbert's 1962 peak gas prediction (black) versus actual US lower-48 state gas production (red)

==== Steidle, 1952 ====
In 1952, Dr. Edward Steidle, Dean of the School of Mineral Industries at Pennsylvania State College, predicted that gas production would soon decline significantly from 1952 rates, so that gas would cease to be a significant energy source by 2002, and possibly as early as 1975.

==== M. King Hubbert ====
In 1956, Hubbert used an estimated ultimate recovery (EUR) of 850 trillion cubic feet (24,000 km^{3}) (an amount postulated by geologist Wallace Pratt) to predict a US production peak of about 14 trillion cubic feet (400 km^{3}) per year to occur "approximately 1970". Pratt, in his EUR estimate (p. 96), explicitly included what he called the "phenomenal discovery rate" that the industry was then experiencing in the offshore Gulf of Mexico.

In 1962, Hubbert pushed his predicted peak back a few years based on a more optimistic estimation of 1,000 trillion cubic feet of total original reserves. His new peak gas curve predicted a peak in 1978 at slightly more than 20 tcf per year.

US gas production reached a peak in 1973 at about 24.1 trillion cubic feet (680 km^{3}), and declined overall for the next decade. But even greater new discoveries in the offshore Gulf of Mexico than anticipated, and development of "unconventional reserves", proved Pratt's EUR estimate to be too low as US gas production rose again.

In 1971, Hubbert revised his peak gas estimate based on updated reserve information. He revised his estimated ultimate recovery upward to 1,075 trillion cubic feet (30,400 km^{3}) for the lower 48 states only, and predicted: "For natural gas, the peak of production will probably be reached between 1975 and 1980." Gas production for the lower 48 states did peak in 1979, and declined for several years, but rose again, and once more Hubbert's assumed EUR of 1,075×10^{12} ft^{3} (30,400 km^{3}) proved to be too low, as actual lower 48 state production from 1936 through 2012 has already exceeded 1,265×10^{12} ft^{3} (35,800 km^{3}), 18% higher than the estimated EUR of 1,075.

==== Recent US peak predictions ====
Economist Doug Reynolds predicted in 2005 that the North American gas peak would occur in 2007 Reynolds revised his forecast in 2009 to include Southern Canada; he predicted that the combined US Lower 48-Southern Canadian gas production would peak in 2013.

Although Hubbert had acknowledged multiple peaks in oil production in Illinois, he used single peak models for oil and gas production in the US as a whole. In 2008, Tad Patzek of the University of California rejected the single-peak model, and showed the multiple peaks of past US gas production as the sum of five different Hubbert curves. He concluded that new technology has more than doubled gas reserves. His figure 15 shows gas production declining steeply after a probable peak in known cycles in 2008. However, he refrained from predicting a date after which gas production would begin terminal decline, but noted: "The actual future of US natural gas production will be the sum of known Hubbert cycles, shown in this paper, and future Hubbert cycles." and warned: "The current drilling effort in the US cannot be sustained without major new advances to increase the productivity of tight formations."

In 2005 Exxon's CEO Lee Raymond said to Reuters that "Gas production has peaked in North America." The Reuters article continues to say "While the number of U.S. rigs drilling for natural gas has climbed about 20 percent over the last year and prices are at record highs, producers have been struggling to raise output." North American natural gas production indeed peaked in 2001 at 27.5×10^{12} ft^{3} (780 km^{3}) per year, and declined to 26.1×10^{12} ft^{3} (740 km^{3}) by 2005, but then rose again in 2006 and 2007 to a new high of 27.9×10^{12} ft^{3} (790 km^{3})in 2007 This would make the 2007 figure 1.45% higher than the 2001 figure, for an average annual increase of 0.24% per year during 2001–2007.

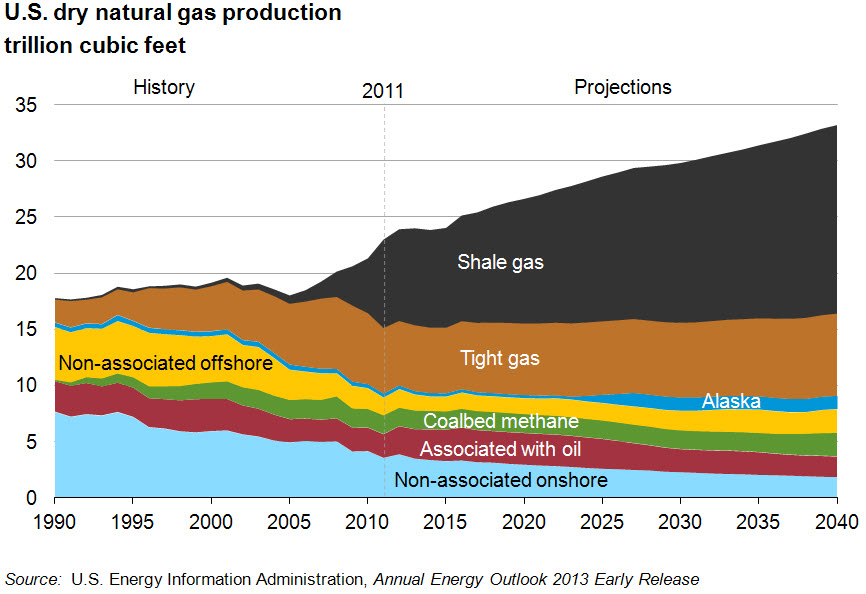
The US Energy Information Administration projects US gas production to increase through 2040, due largely to increased shale gas production.

In December 2009 the US Energy Information Administration (EIA) projected US marketed gas production will have reached a first peak at 20.60×10^{12} ft^{3} (583 km^{3}) in 2009, decline to 18.90×10^{12} ft^{3} (535 km^{3}) in 2013, then rise again to 23.27×10^{12} ft^{3} (659 km^{3}) in 2035, the final year of their projection, for an average annual rate of increase of 0.47% per year during 2009–2035 In its Annual Energy Outlook 2010 released in May 2010, EIA projected growth from 20.6×10^{12} ft^{3} (580 km^{3}) in 2008 (same amount as 2009) to 23.3 trillion cubic feet (660 km^{3}) in 2035 in the Reference case, with Alternative case estimates ranging 17.4 to 25.9×10^{12} ft^{3} (730 km^{3}) in 2035. These represent productions of average annual growth rates between −0.63% (net decline) and 0.85% in the alternate cases, and 0.46% in the reference case.

==== North American natural gas crisis, 2000–2008 ====
Natural gas prices at the Henry Hub in US Dollars per million BTUs for 2000–2012.

The natural gas crisis is typically described by upward price spikes of natural gas in North America from 2000 to 2008, due to the decline in production and the increase in demand for electricity generation. Gas production in the U.S. fell from 20,570,295×10^{6} ft^{3} (5.824859×10^{11} m^{3}) in 2001 to 18,950,734×10^{6} ft^{3} (5.366250×10^{11} m^{3}) in 2005, before rising again in 2006 and 2007.

The anticipated gas shortage in North America led some, such as former Federal Reserve Chairman Alan Greenspan, to advocate increased imports of liquefied natural gas (LNG). However, record high natural gas production rates and proved reserves in the US have put LNG imports on hold, and even spawned projects for LNG exports from North America. As of April 2015, ten LNG export terminals had been approved and six are under construction in the US and Canada.

==== Estimates of total reserve base ====
The Potential Gas Committee, a non-profit group at the Colorado School of Mines, estimated US natural gas resources to be 43,200 cubic kilometres (1,525 trillion cubic feet) in 2007 (86 times current annual consumption) and in 2009 raised their estimate again to 63,600 km^{3} (2,247 trillion ft^{3}) (almost 100 times current annual consumption). The large increase over previous years' estimates was attributed to a surge in natural gas drilling and exploration spurred by a rise in prices and new technology allowing production from once uneconomic formations, such as shale and coal seams.

== World peak gas ==
In 2002, R.W. Bentley (p. 189) predicted a global "decline in conventional gas production from about 2020."

One forecast is for natural gas demand to peak in 2035.

In their March 2013 report, "Fossil and Nuclear Fuels – The Supply Outlook", the Energy Watch Group predicted that global natural gas production "will peak around or even before the year 2020". However, the same report (page 75) postulated that US natural gas production had peaked in 2012, and predicted that it would decline steeply after 2015. Instead, US gas production has continued to rise through 2017.

== See also ==
- 2004 Argentine energy crisis – an example of the effects of a gas shortage
- Global energy crisis (2021–2023)
- Hubbert peak theory
- Methane, the principal constituent of natural gas.

=== Resource peaks ===
- Peak coal
- Peak copper
- Peak oil
- Peak soil
- Peak uranium
- Peak water
- Peak wheat
