= Resin worker =

Occupation

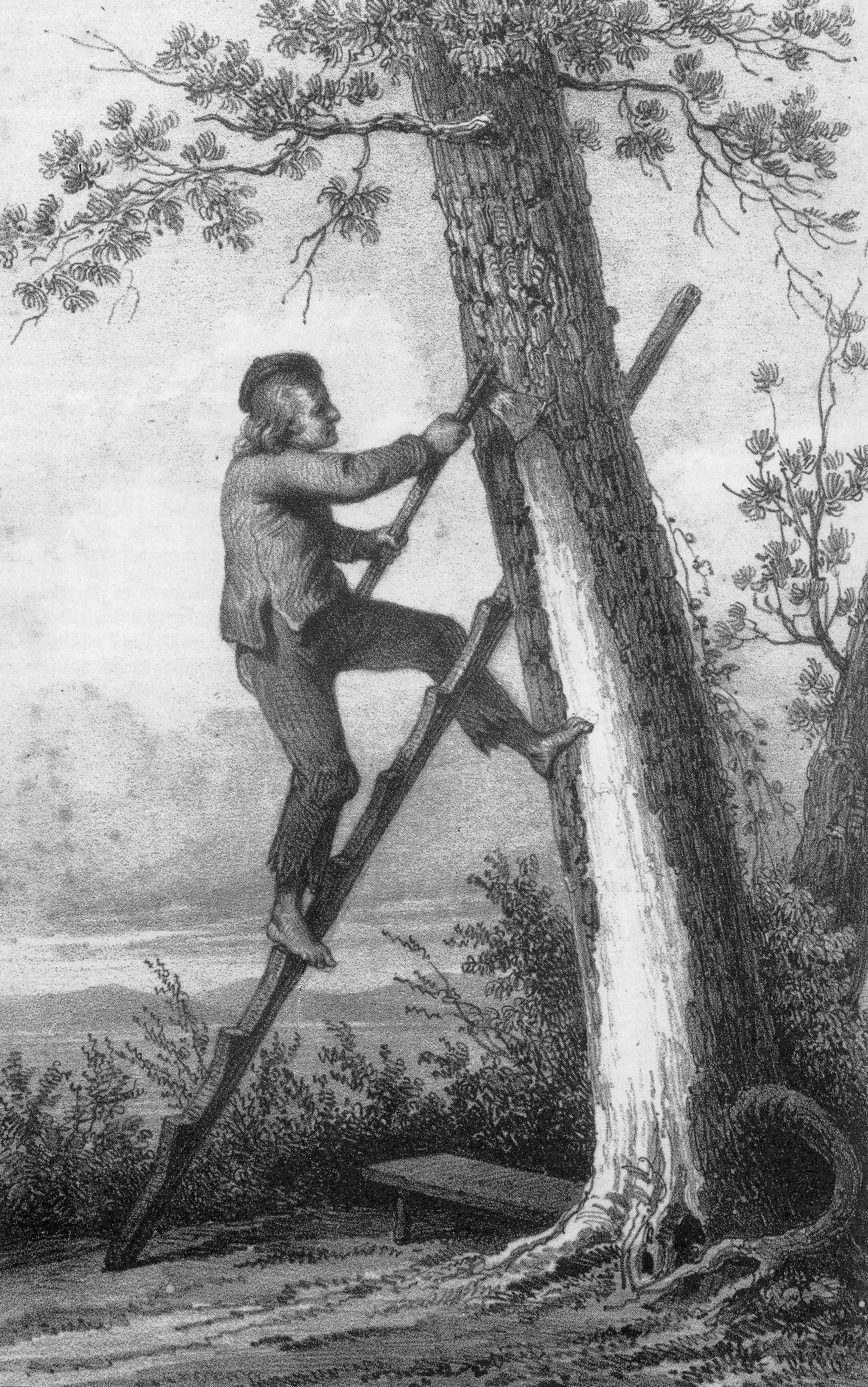
French resin burner

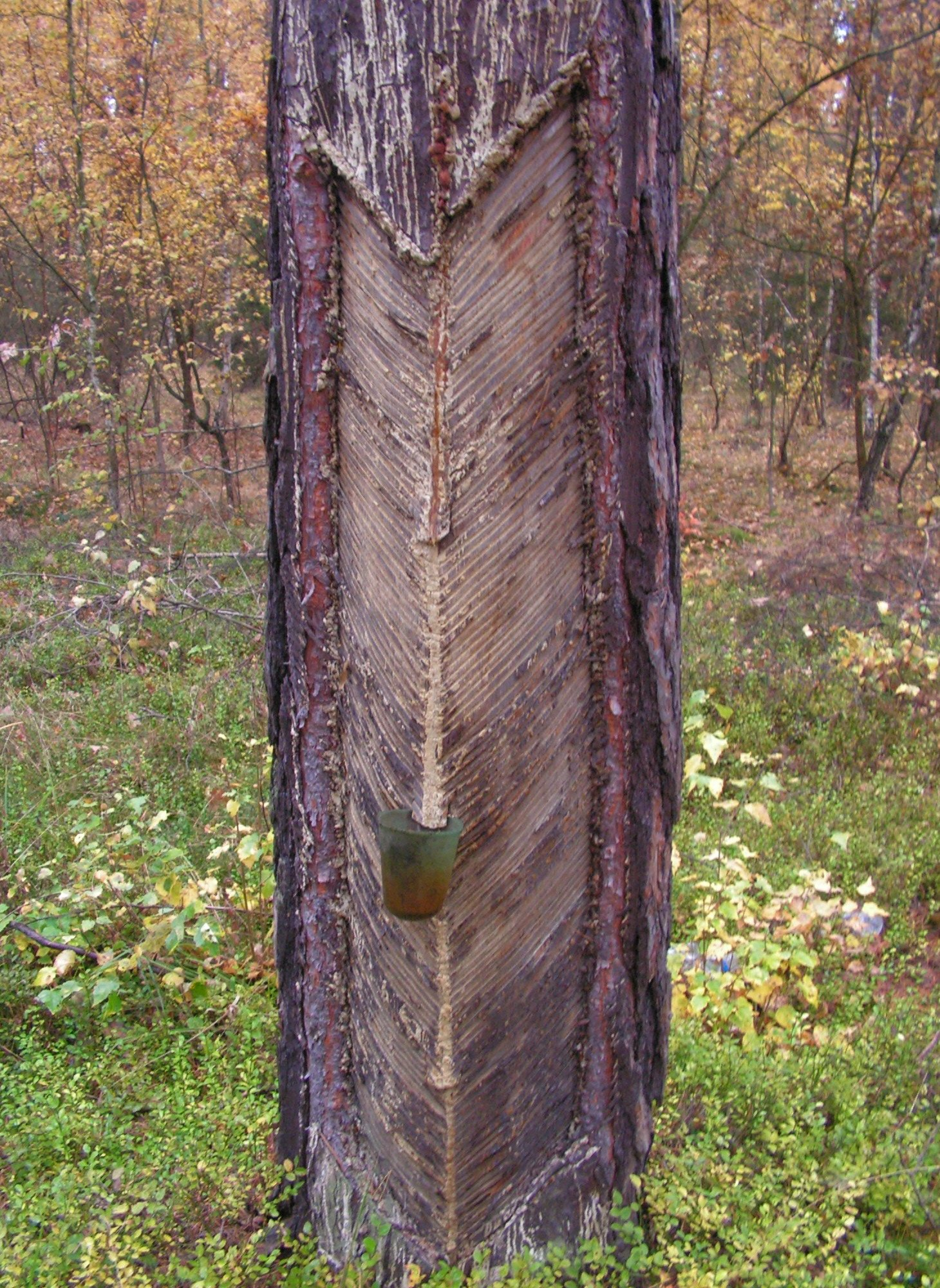
Live resin in Poland

Resin workers were people whose work involved the extraction or working of resin, which was needed as a raw material in the manufacture of pitch, tar and turpentine. Resin work was an occupation that largely died out in the 19th and 20th centuries, but it was sometimes a primary occupation as well as a secondary source of income.

== Terminology ==
As well as the general term "resin worker", the terms resin burner and resin picker are also used in the literature.

=== France ===
In France, where the occupation was common, a resin picker was a gemmeur, whilst a resin worker was a résinier.

=== Germany ===
In German-speaking lands, the general term was Harzer. Other names were Harzbrenner ("resin burner") in the Palatinate region and Pecher ("pitcher") in Lower Austria, or Pechler, Pechsieder, Harzeinsammler ("resin picker"),Harzscharrer ("resin scraper") and Pechhacker ("resin cutter").

== Resin worker's craft ==
From ancient times resin was gathered from pines in the form of "living resin" (Lebendharzung). By removing bark from the tree trunk and cutting into the underlying wood, the tree was injured in order to tap into the resin that was exuded; it was then gathered and processed. Through this cutting and "bleeding", the wood of the tree became generally unusable for construction or other purposes. That was a reason why enmity existed between resin workers and foresters.

To increase the yield, carbonizing ovens (Schwelöfen), known in the Palatine Forest as "resin ovens" (Harzöfen), were used. Using wood as a raw material, resinous pine wood (Kienholz) was turned into resin and pitch through a burning process. The burning of resin was sometimes strictly regulated in order to prevent the wanton damage of the forest.

In the 19th century, larger and larger facilities were built to extract resin. In the Palatinate area of Germany, street and place names witness to the industry that went into decline in the 20th century (e.g. Harzofen in Kaiserslautern and near Elmstein).

Resin was gathered in this way in East Germany until the Wende in 1990.

== See also ==
- de:Pecherei in Lower Austria
- Gemmage (French)
- List of obsolete occupations
