= Technocracy Study Course =

- Author: M. King Hubbert
- Language: English
- Publication date: 1934
- Publication place: United States

The Technocracy Study Course is a technocratic critique of the price system, written by M. King Hubbert and first published in 1934. It is the ideological basis for the Technocracy movement, highlighting economic and social consequences of the capitalist price system and suggests an alternative socioeconomic system based on physical laws and constraints.
