= Rocky Mountain Association of Geologists =

Non-profit organisation in Denver, Colorado

The Rocky Mountain Association of Geologists (RMAG), based in Denver, Colorado, is one of the oldest and largest regional geological societies in the United States. The society is a nonprofit organization founded in 1922. It is a regional affiliate of the American Association of Petroleum Geologists (AAPG).

RMAG publishes geological research, sponsors monthly lectures, and geological field trips. The society organizes and sponsors numerous educational conferences and continuing education courses, often in association with other geological societies.

== Publications ==
- The Mountain Geologist, a quarterly peer-reviewed journal of geological research.
- The Outcrop, a monthly newsletter.
- various conference proceedings.
