= M. King Hubbert =

American geologist (1903–1989)

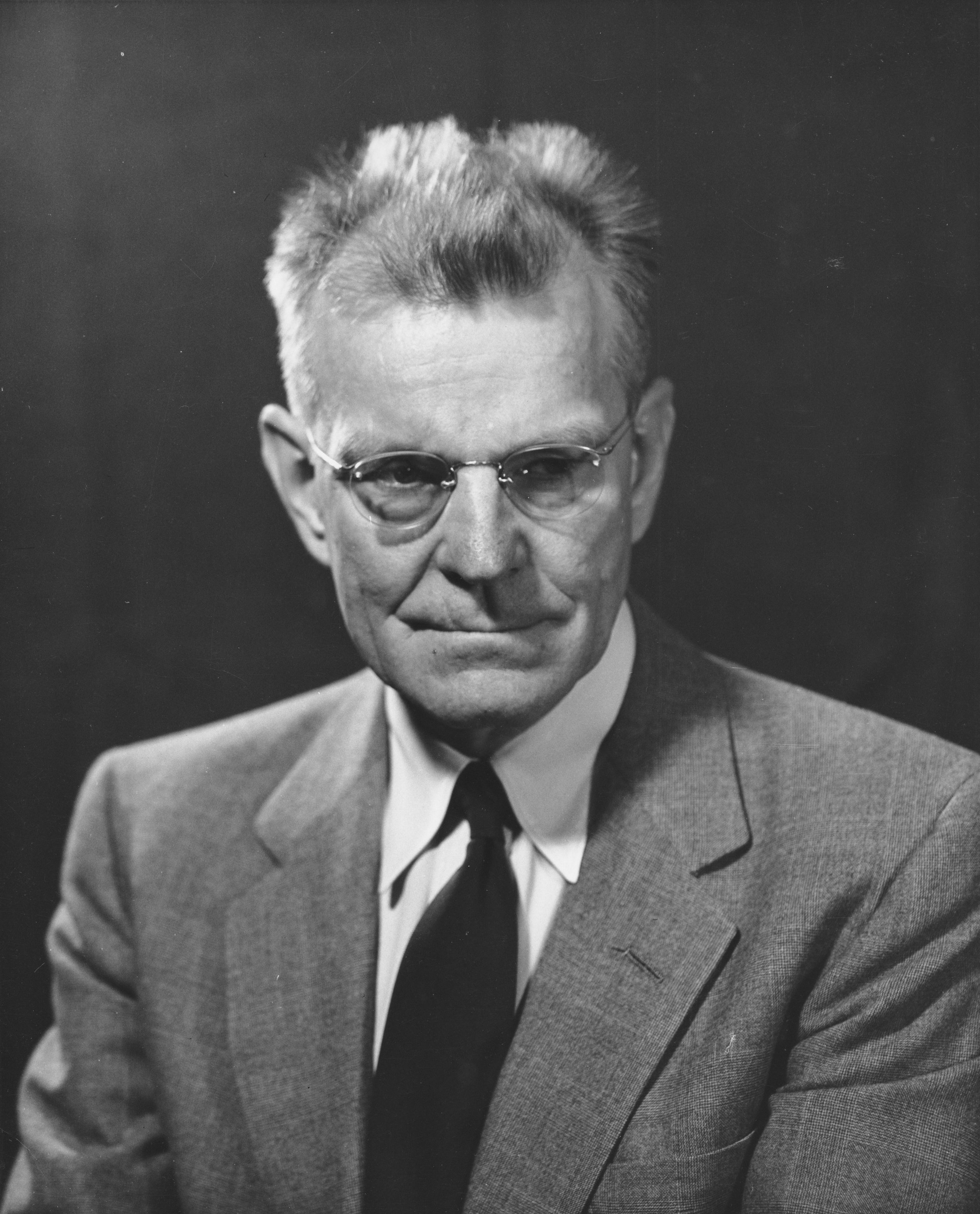
- Hubbert c. 1958
- Born: Marion King Hubbert; October 5, 1903; San Saba, Texas, U.S.
- Died: October 11, 1989 (aged 86); Bethesda, Maryland, U.S.
- Occupations: Geologist, geophysicist
- Known for: Hubbert curve Hubbert linearization Hubbert peak theory
- Awards: Arthur L. Day Medal (1954); Penrose Medal (1973); William Smith Medal (1978); Vetlesen Prize (1981); Elliott Cresson Medal (1981)

Marion King Hubbert (October 5, 1903 – October 11, 1989) was an American geologist and geophysicist. He worked at the Shell research lab in Houston, Texas. He made several important contributions to geology, geophysics, and petroleum geology, most notably the Hubbert curve and Hubbert peak theory (a basic component of peak oil), with important political ramifications. He was often referred to as "M. King Hubbert" or "King Hubbert".

== Biography ==
Hubbert was born in San Saba, Texas. He attended the University of Chicago, where he received a Bachelor of Science in 1926, a Master of Science in 1928, and a Doctor of Philosophy in 1937, studying geology, mathematics, and physics. He worked as an assistant geologist for the Amerada Petroleum Company for two years while pursuing the PhD, additionally teaching geophysics at Columbia University. He also served as a senior analyst at the Board of Economic Warfare. He joined the Shell Oil Company in 1943, retiring from that firm in 1964. After he retired from Shell, he became a senior research geophysicist for the United States Geological Survey until his retirement in 1976. He also held positions as a professor of geology and geophysics at Stanford University from 1963 to 1968, and as a professor at UC Berkeley from 1973 to 1976.

Hubbert was an avid technocrat. He co-founded Technocracy Incorporated with Howard Scott. Hubbert wrote a study course that was published without attribution called the Technocracy Study Course, which advocates a non-market economics form of energy accounting, in contrast to the current price system method.

Hubbert was a member of the board of governors, and served as secretary of education in that organization. Hubbert died on October 11, 1989, at the age of 86 while receiving treatment for pulmonary embolism.

== Research ==
A bell-shaped production curve, as originally suggested by M. King Hubbert in 1956

Hubbert made several contributions to geophysics, including a mathematical demonstration that rock in the Earth's crust, because it is under immense pressure in large areas, should exhibit plasticity, similar to clay. This demonstration explained the observed results that the Earth's crust deforms over time. He also studied the flow of underground fluids.

Based on theoretical arguments, Hubbert (1940) proposed a constitutive equation $K_\text{abs} = N D^2$ for absolute permeability $K_\text{abs}$ of an underground water or oil reservoir where $D$ is the average grain diameter and $N$ is a dimensionless proportionality constant. However, Kozeny (1927) proposed a constitutive equation for absolute permeability which contains Hubbert's proposal as a factor. Hubbert (1940, 1956) also presented a force potential, denoted $\Phi$ or $\Phi_h$, that bears his name:

$$\Phi = \int_\text{Pref}^P \frac{dP}{\rho(P)}-gz \implies \nabla\Phi_h =\frac 1\rho \, \nabla P - g \, \nabla z$$

Some years later Hubbert (1956) showed that Darcy's law can be derived from the Navier–Stokes equation of motion of a viscous fluid.

Hubbert is best known for his studies on the size of oil fields and natural gas reserves, and the limits these impose on rates of oil and gas production. He predicted that for any oil-producing area, whether a province, a nation, or the planet as a whole, the rate of petroleum production of the reserve over time would resemble a bell curve. Based on his theory, he presented a paper to the 1956 meeting of the American Petroleum Institute in San Antonio, Texas, which predicted that overall petroleum production would peak in the United States between 1965, which he considered most likely, and 1970, which he considered an upper bound. At first his prediction received much criticism, for the most part because many other predictions of oil capacity had been made over the preceding half century, but these had usually been based on the reserves-to-production ratio, had not taken into account future discoveries, and had proven false. Hubbert became famous when U.S. oil production hit a peak in 1970 and began to decline, as he had predicted.

In 1974, Hubbert projected that global oil production would peak in 1995 "if current trends continue". Various subsequent predictions have been made by others as trends have fluctuated in the intervening years.

Hubbert believed that solar power would be a practical renewable energy replacement for fossil fuels, and that nuclear energy in breeder reactors would be able to sustain humanity for centuries. He also states that "provided world population can somehow be brought under control, we may at last have found an energy supply (uranium) adequate for our needs for at least the next few centuries of the 'foreseeable future'."

=== Contributions ===
Hubbert's contributions to science have been summarized as follows:

- Mathematical demonstration that rock in the Earth's crust is plastic, and that the Earth's crust deforms over time.
- Prediction of migration paths of hydrocarbons.
- Predictions of peak rates of oil and gas mining, based on a consistent mathematical model which ties reserves, discovery rates, and production rates. His model remains highly influential, and has been widely applied to other finite resources.

=== Renewable resources ===
- Fisheries: At least one researcher has attempted to perform Hubbert linearization (Hubbert curve) on the whaling industry, as well as charting the transparently dependent price of caviar on sturgeon depletion. The Atlantic northwest cod fishery was a renewable resource, but the numbers of fish taken exceeded the fish's rate of recovery. The end of the cod fishery matches the exponential drop of the Hubbert bell curve. The comparison of the cases of fisheries and of mineral extraction shows that the human pressure on the environment is causing a wide range of resources to go through a depletion cycle which mirrors the Hubbert curve.

== Accolades ==
Hubbert was a member of the National Academy of Sciences and the American Academy of Arts and Sciences. He was long affiliated with the Geological Society of America, receiving their Arthur L. Day Medal in 1954, being elected President of the Society in 1962, and receiving the Society's Penrose Medal in 1973. He received the Vetlesen Prize from the G. Unger Vetlesen Foundation and Columbia University in 1981. He also received the Elliott Cresson Medal in 1981.

== See also ==
- Bioeconomics (biology)
- Fred Meissner
- The Limits to Growth
