= CNH =

CNH may refer to:

- Claremont Municipal Airport in Claremont, New Hampshire, United States
- CNH Industrial, an agriculture and construction equipment company
  - CNH Global, a subsidiary of CNH Industrial
- Carteira Nacional de Habilitação, the Driving licence in Brazil
- the unofficial currency code for the Chinese Yuan in the offshore market, see Renminbi
- The ISO 639-3 code for the Hakha Chin language
- Consejo Nacional de Huelga, "National Strike Council", an organization for human rights founded in Mexico, 1968
- Comisión Nacional de Hidrocarburos (Mexico), the National Hydrocarbons Commission
- Central neurogenic hyperventilation in medicine
