= Oil reserves in Mexico =

As of 2007, the proven oil reserves in Mexico were 12.4 billion barrels (1.97×10^{9} m^{3}). The US Energy Information Administration estimated Mexican proved reserves to be 10.3 billion barrels (1.64×10^{9} m^{3}) as of 2013.

== Production ==
Mexico was the seventh-largest oil producer in the world as of 2006, producing 3.71 million barrels per day (590×10^{3} m^{3}/d) of petroleum products, of which 3.25 million barrels per day (517×10^{3} m^{3}/d) was crude oil. Mexican oil production has started to decline rapidly. The U.S. Energy Information Administration had estimated that Mexican production of petroleum products would decline to 3.52 million barrels per day (560×10^{3} m^{3}/d) in 2007 and 3.32 million barrels per day (528×10^{3} m^{3}/d) in 2008.

Mexican crude oil production fell in 2007, and was below 3.0 million barrels per day (480×10^{3} m^{3}/d) by the start of 2008. In mid-2008, Pemex said that it would try to keep crude oil production above 2.8 million barrels per day (450×10^{3} m^{3}/d) for the rest of the year. Mexican authorities expected the decline to continue in future, and were pessimistic that it could be raised back to previous levels even with foreign investment.

The constitution of Mexico gives the state oil company, Pemex, exclusive rights over oil production, and the Mexican government treats Pemex as a major source of revenue. As a result, Pemex has insufficient capital to develop new and more expensive resources on its own, and cannot take on foreign partners to supply money and technology it lacks. To address some of these problems, in September 2007, Mexico’s Congress approved reforms including a reduction in the taxes levied on Pemex.

Most of Mexico's production decline involves one enormous oil field in the Gulf of Mexico. From 1979 to 2007, Mexico produced most of its oil from the supergiant Cantarell Field, which used to be the second-biggest oil field in the world by production. Because of falling production, in 1997 Pemex started a massive nitrogen injection project to maintain oil flow, which now consumes half the nitrogen produced in the world. As a result of nitrogen injection, production at Cantarell rose from 1.1 million barrels per day (170×10^{3} m^{3}/d) in 1996 to a peak of 2.1 million barrels per day (330×10^{3} m^{3}/d) in 2004. However, during 2006 Cantarell's output fell 25% from 2.0 million barrels per day (320×10^{3} m^{3}/d) in January to 1.5 million barrels per day (240×10^{3} m^{3}/d) in December, with the decline continuing through 2007.

In mid-2008, Pemex announced that it would try to end the year with Cantarell producing at least 1.0 million barrels per day (160×10^{3} m^{3}/d). However, in January 2008, Pemex said that the oil production rate at Cantarell had fallen to 811,000 barrels per day (129,000 m^{3}/d) by December 2008, a decline of 36 percent from a year earlier. This resulted in a decline of total Mexican oil production declining by 9.2 percent from 3.1 million barrels per day (490×10^{3} m^{3}/d) in 2007 to 2.8 million barrels per day (450×10^{3} m^{3}/d) in 2008, the lowest rate of oil production since 1995.

As for its other fields, 40% of Mexico's remaining reserves are in the Chicontepec Field, which was found in 1926. The field has remained undeveloped because the oil is trapped in impermeable rock, requiring advanced technology and very large numbers of oil wells to extract it. The remainder of Mexico's fields are smaller, more expensive to develop, and contain heavy oil and trades at a significant discount to light and medium oil, which is easier to refine.

In June 2007, former U.S. Federal Reserve Chairman Alan Greenspan warned that declining oil production in Mexico could cause a major fiscal crisis there, and that Mexico needed to increase investment in its energy sector to prevent it.

== Future resources ==
In February 2009, DeGolyer and MacNaughton estimated that the Chicontepec Field had 139 billion barrels of oil in place, but that there was as yet no technical way to recover it. Some government officials were unhappy with the results at Chicontepec, expressing concern that costs were higher and oil production lower than expected. Mexico had spent $3.4 billion on the field, but it was producing only 30,800 barrels per day (4,900 m^{3}/d) by June, 2009 and increased only slightly to 46,000 barrels per day (7,300 m^{3}/d) in the 3rd quarter 2010, causing them to question whether more investment in the field was justified.

The 2013 Energy Reform has introduced private investment by international energy companies in exploration efforts in Mexico. Italian company Eni announced in July 2017 that a new well in its Amoca Field exploration project put the field's resources at 1 billion barrels. The company plans to begin production from the field in 2019 at a rate of 30,000 to 50,000 barrels per day. Also in July 2017, Premier Oil, Talos Energy, and Sierra Oil & Gas announced that exploratory drilling in the Zama-1 field, located in the shallow waters of the Gulf of Mexico, had uncovered a formation with between 1.4 billion and two billion barrels of light crude oil. Because not all oil present in such a formation is technically recovered, it is believed that the formation could yield about 425 million barrels.

== See also ==
- Petroleum industry in Mexico
