= Super basin =

Oil industry geological term

Super basin is a term in Petroleum Geology referring to the most important basins for the oil industry. The top 30 super basin contain about 57% of the biggest oil fields in the world. The term was coined in 2016 by Bob Fryklund and Pete Stark.

== Definition ==
In 2016, Bob Fryklund and Pete Stark defined "super basin" combining commerciality, geoscience architecture, infrastructure, and above-ground issues. According to the original paper published in IHS Markit, a basin must count with at least five barrels of oil equivalent (BBOe) produced and at the same volume of recoverable remaining reserves; two or more petroleum systems or source rocks; stacked reservoirs; existing infrastructure and oil field services; and good access to markets. A characteristic is richness measured as the total volume of hydrocarbons per square kilometer.

== Location ==
The US Permian Basin is the archetypal onshore super basin. However, other basins are located around the world, such as South America's Neuquen Basin in 2018, which counts with favorable regulations and government support. In Mexico, there are potentially ripe basins. Offshore basins in the North Sea, Brazil, and the Gulf of Mexico are benefiting from geophysical enhancements. The top 30 super basin contain about 57% of the biggest oil fields in the world.

== List of super basins ==
The top 30 super basin contain about 57% of the biggest oil fields in the world. Some of the super basins in the world are:

- Alberta
- Williston
- Appalachian Foreland
- East Texas & Arkoma, Gulf Coast
- Permian
- Tampico-Misantla
- Maracaibo
- East Venezuela
- Santos
- Neuquen
- Congo Fan
- Niger Delta
- Illizi
- Sirte
- Hassi Massoud
- Central Arabian
- Rub’Al Khali
- Oman
- South Caspian
- North Carnarvon
- Bohal Gulf
- Songliao
- West Siberian
- Timan-Pechora
- Volga-Urals
- Pre-Caspian
- Zagros
- Viking Graben
- Moray Firth
- Central Graben
- Northwest German
- Sureste Basin
- Anadarko
