= Sureste Basin =

Hydrocarbon province in southeast Mexico

Coordinates: 19.090°N 92.314°W

The Sureste Basin or Salinas-Sureste Basin is a hydrocarbon province located in southeast Mexico. The basin covers an area of 188,000 km^{2} (73,000 sq mi) and comprises proven reserves of 50 billion barrels of oil. Due to recent successful explorations, the area has been called a Super Basin.

The first oil explorations in the onshore Sureste Basin started in 1907. Offshore explorations started in the mid 20th century. Improvement of drilling techniques in the 1970s allowed the discovering of giant oil fields, such as Cantarell. Since 2015, oil companies have started exploration in deep waters. In 2017, the Zama oil field was discovered.

== Description ==
Sureste Basin covers an area of 188,000 km^{2} (73,000 sq mi), that extends from the Chiapas fold belt in the onshore southern limit, to the base of the Campeche Slope in the deep-waters region. It includes prolific oil sub-basins such as Salina, Sonda de Campeche, and Campeche-Tabasco. Deposits range from the late Triassic to Holocene ages. It's described as a highly structural salt basin.

== Other Names ==
The basin has been previously named Campeche Basin (Cuenca de Campeche), Isthmian Salt Basin (Cuenca de Salina del Istmo) and Cuenca Salina (Salt Basin). Also, the northern part of the basin has been named separately as Yucatán Salt Basin, despite there are not geological separation.

The Mexican National Commission of Hydrocarbons (Comisión Nacional de Hidrocarburos, CNH) and the Mexican state-owned oil company PEMEX adopted the name Sureste Basin.

== Oil Explorations ==
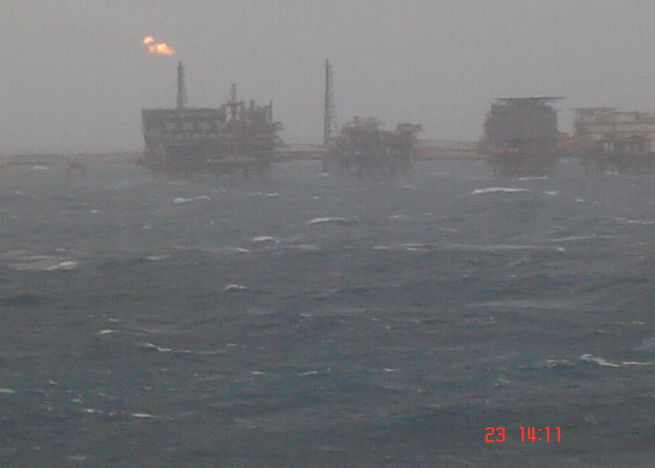
Cantarell oil field, located in the Sureste Basin

In the onshore and shallow-water area of the Sureste Basin, there had been made around 140 oil discoveries until 2017. However, in the deep waters area of the basin, there had been made only 12 exploration wildcats. In 2017, proven reserves of the Sureste Basin were over 50 billion barrels of oil.

First oil discoveries were made in onshore Tabasco by wildcatters following oil seepage around the flanks of onshore surface piercing. Due to the complex salt-core geology of the region, these first efforts were cautious. The Filisola oil field was the first discovery in the area, made in 1907, and followed by the Ixhuatlán oil field in 1911. By 1930, around 50 exploration wildcats were made, allowing the discovery of several oil fields such as Tupilco, Tonala, and Nuevo Teapa.

Offshore exploration started in 1949 after a marine geophysical survey of the Coatzacoalcos and Grijalva rivers was acquired. In 1959, the Santa Ana field was discovered offshore. 2D seismic technology and better deep drilling techniques allowed the discovering of giant oil fields in the 1970s, such as Cactus, Samaria, Cunducuan, Iride, and Cantarell.

Since 2014, oil companies have explored the deep-water extension with 3D seismic technology. In 2017, Zama oil field was discovered. In 2020, Italian-based oil company Eni announced its plans to invest $130 million for drilling oil and gas explorations wells in the Sureste Basin.

== See also ==
- Cantarell Field
- List of oil fields
