= 2017 Mexican protests =

Series of protests against a hike in the price of gasoline by the Mexican government

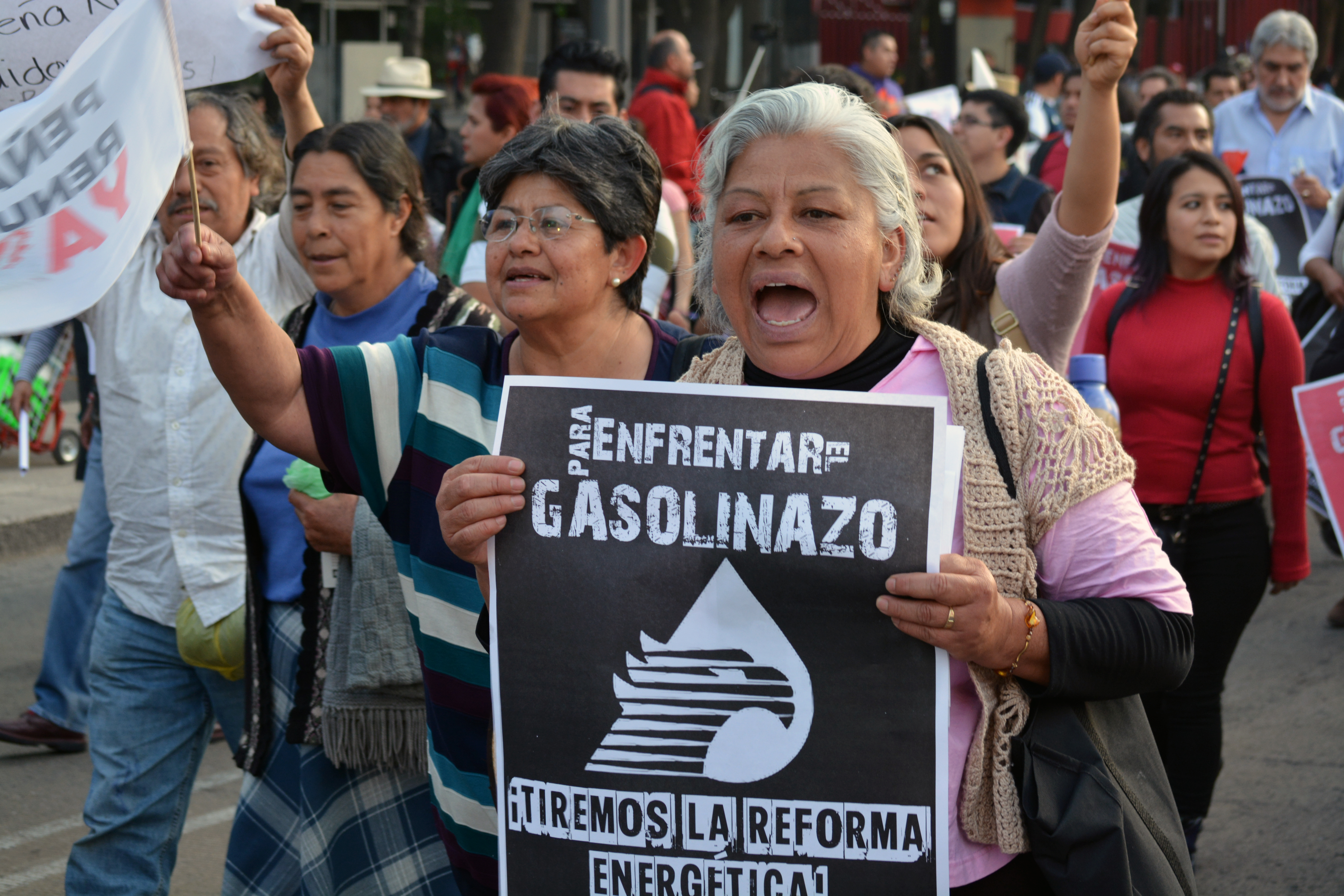
- Protestors march in the streets of Mexico City
- Date: January 1, 2017 – January 10, 2017
- Location: Mexico
- Caused by: Rise in gasoline prices
- Methods: Demonstrations; Riots; Strike action

Parties
National Regeneration Movement	Government of Mexico; Federal Police (Mexico)

Lead figures
Andrés Manuel López Obrador	Enrique Peña Nieto; Salvador Cienfuegos Zepeda; José Antonio Meade Kuribreña

Casualties
- Death: 5(1 Police Officer)
- Arrested: 1,461

The 2017 Mexican protests were a series of protests against a hike in the price of gasoline by the Mexican government which came into effect on 1 January 2017. Thousands of protestors marched, blocked highways and shut down state-owned gas stations. The rise in price—known in Mexico as the gasolinazo—was a result of president Enrique Peña Nieto's privatization of the Mexican oil industry. Other factors that led to the protests include high inflation, a weak peso, widespread violence due to the Mexican drug war, and Peña Nieto's low approval rating and corruption allegations.

== Background ==
On 26 December 2016, the Mexican government announced that gasoline prices would rise by up to 20% in January as result of the transition towards eliminating price controls. Beginning with the Mexican oil expropriation in 1938, the government controlled the country's entire petroleum industry, including both production and retail sales. The state-owned company, Pemex, held a monopoly on all gasoline sales in the country, and prices were set by the government. In 2013, the newly elected President Enrique Peña Nieto began the process of privatizing Mexico's oil industry, which would eventually allow private companies to establish their own gas stations.

The Mexican government planned to transition to market prices gradually throughout 2017. Finance Minister José Antonio Meade explained that the price hike was "an important change," which would "allow prices to reflect costs, and avoid artificial distortions." The rise in gasoline prices was also a result of the government ending subsidies to the oil industry and may have been motivated by projected budget deficits because of the Mexican peso's weakening value relative to the US dollar.

The price hike, scheduled to begin on 1 January 2017, coincided with an economy marked by high inflation in addition to the weak peso. Donald Trump's recent election as president of the United States led to uncertainty, as he had campaigned on strong economic protectionism. Furthermore, Peña Nieto was experiencing historically-low approval ratings and was involved in numerous scandals.

Tensions in Mexico were also raised by the high homicide rates associated with the continued Mexican drug war, which had begun over ten years earlier.

== Protests ==
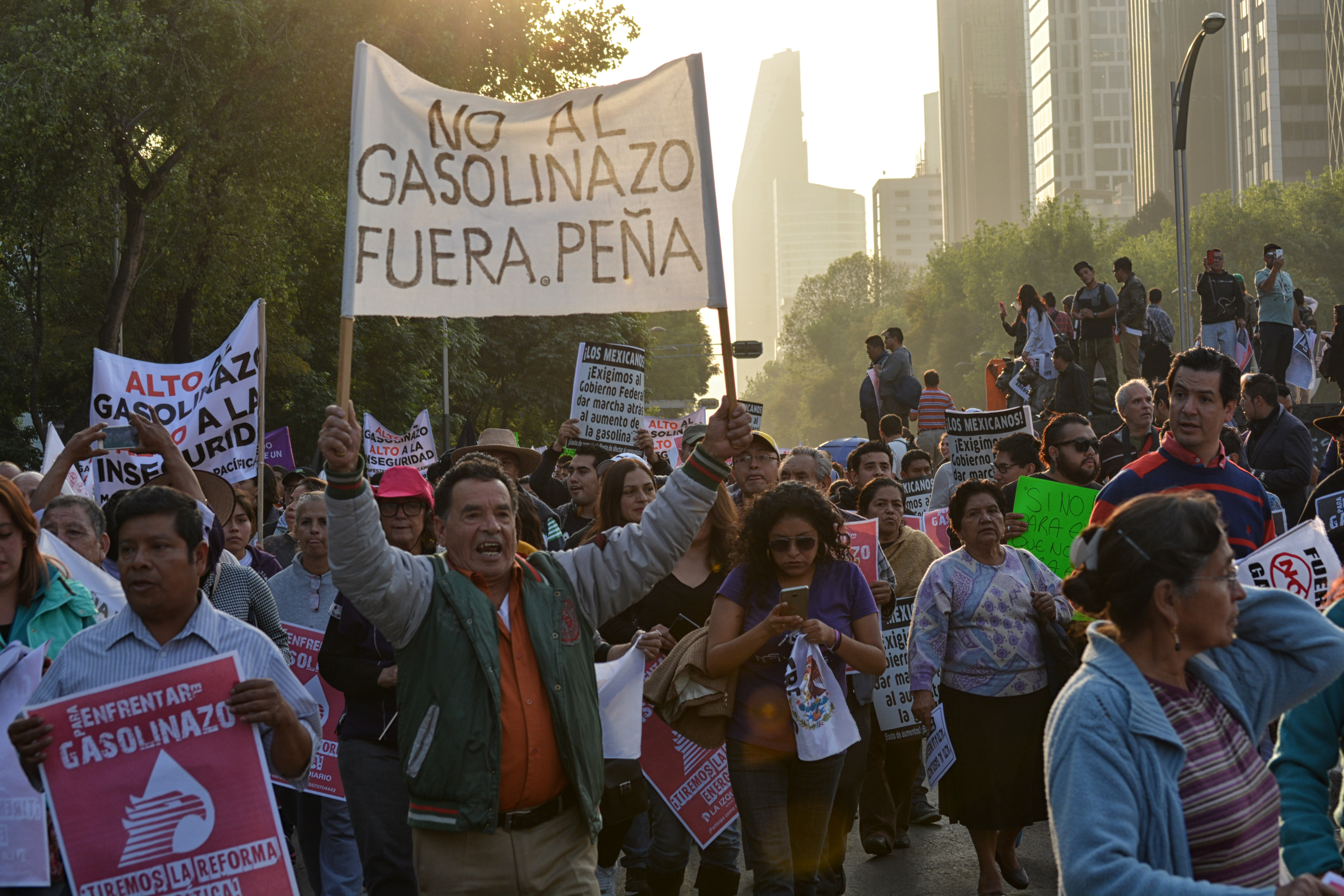
Protestors in Mexico City on 9 January 2017

Protests began on 1 January, the same day the new prices took effect. Activists used social media to organize protests and shut down gas stations throughout the country. Protestors also blockaded major highways and border crossings. Their demands included cheaper gasoline prices as well as the resignation of president Peña Nieto.

Protests and riots took place all over the country. Demonstrations in Tijuana and Nogales forced authorities to temporarily close Mexico–United States border crossings. In Rosarito, a man intentionally drove his vehicle into federal police officers. Looting was reported in Veracruz. In Tabasco, a convenience store was ransacked and burned. Mexico City had two large demonstrations in early January, with thousands of protestors in attendance.

Over 250 stores were looted during the protests. At least one police officer was killed while trying to prevent looting. At least four deaths have been attributed to the protests, as well as 1,500 arrests.

== See also ==
- Gasoline and diesel usage and pricing
- Petroleum industry in Mexico
- Pemex
- Yo Soy 132
- List of fuel protests
