= Tourmaline Oil =

Canadian petroleum and natural gas company

- Type: Public company
- Traded as: TSX: TOU
- Industry: Petroleum industry
- Founded: 2008; 18 years ago
- Headquarters: 2900 250 6th Ave SW; Calgary, Alberta, Canada
- Key people: Michael L. Rose, President & CEO; Brian G. Robinson, Vice President, Finance & Chief Financial Officer
- Products: Crude oil Natural gas Natural gas liquids
- Revenue: ▼CA$5.538 billion (2023)
- Operating income: ▼CA$2.244 billion (2023)
- Net income: ▼CA$1.736 billion (2023)
- Total assets: ▲CA$20.097 billion (2023)
- Total equity: ▲CA$14.016 billion (2023)
- Number of employees: 1045 (2024)
- Website: www.tourmalineoil.com

Tourmaline Oil is a Canadian energy company engaged in the exploration, development, and extraction of crude oil and natural gas. It is headquartered in Calgary, Alberta in Canada. A major natural gas producer, it became the largest natural gas producer in Canada in 2021. It is also the first Canadian oil and gas exploration and development company to directly engage in the liquified natural gas business.

== Corporate overview ==
As of October 2021, Tourmaline was the largest natural gas producer in Canada, and the fifth largest natural gas producer in North America. In Canada, the firm was also the second-largest producer of processed natural gas liquids, and the second-largest producer of natural gas condensate.

Tourmaline primarily focuses on the Alberta Basin, Montney Formation, and Peace River oil sands. Its product mix is 80 percent natural gas and 20 percent crude petroleum and natural gas liquids. The company had 1,600 wells in 2020, and owned and operated 19 natural gas processing plants. The company sold 28 percent of its natural gas in the United States.

As of March 6, 2024, Tourmaline has 298 full time employees and 117 consultants located at its Calgary office, and 106 full time employees and 524 contract operators in various field locations.

== Corporate history ==
=== Founding and IPO ===
Michael L. Rose graduated from Queen's University at Kingston in 1979. He went to work for Shell Canada, where became deeply familiar with the natural gas fields in Alberta and British Columbia. He left Shell and founded Berkley Petroleum in 1993. He sold the company to Anadarko Petroleum in 2001 for CAN$1.5 billion. In June 2001, he founded Duvernay Oil, and sold it to Shell Canada in 2008 for CAN$5.9 billion.

In August 2008, Rose founded Tourmaline Oil. Many members of the leadership team at Berkley Petroleum joined Rose at Duvernay Oil, and moved with him a second time to Tourmaline Oil. Tourmaline's management invested CAN$253 million of their own money to get the company up and running. The company went public in mid-November 2010, raising CAN$228 million. Tourmaline management purchased 30 percent of the stock offering.

From the beginning, Tourmaline management intended to limit the firm's indebtedness. Tourmaline was to be largely self-financing, funding expansion with cash generated from operations.

=== Early years ===
Tourmaline Oil grew rapidly by buying up very small producers and owners of mineral rights, and signing farmout agreements. By the end of 2010, it was one of the largest property owners in the Alberta Basin, and was a major producer in the Montney in British Columbia. The company drilled more than 70 wells, and announced plans to drill another 55 in 2011. Production reached 23,000 boe (barrels of oil equivalent) per day, with 85 percent of its product consisting of natural gas. The company issued 4 million new shares in August 2012, raising CAN$117 million. In October, it acquired Huron Energy Corp. for CAN$258 million the next month exploration company APL Oil & Gas for $84 million.

The company quietly absorbed its acquisitions and brought new wells online in 2013, but in 2014 Tourmaline purchased Santonia Energy's Deep Basin assets for CAN$189.1 million. Tourmaline issued 3.23 million new shares to pay for the deal, which brought 221,000 acres (89,000 ha) of new land under Tourmaline's control. In November 2014, the company announced a major joint venture with Canadian Non-Operated Resources (CNOR), a subsidiary of Grafton Asset Management and other investment funds. CNOR invested CAN$500 million, giving CNOR a 25 percent ownership interest in Tourmaline's Peace River facilities, land, production, reserves, and wells. Tourmaline said it would spend CAN$400 million over five years on new drilling and production facilities in the Peace River oil sands.

Tourmaline bought out partner Perpetual Energy in March 2015. The two companies had a joint venture to develop oil and gas properties in the West Edson gas field of west-central Alberta. Tourmaline gained the mineral rights by giving Perpetual Energy about 6.75 million share of Tourmaline stock, worth approximately CAN$256.5 million. Perpetual Energy's chief executive officer was Susan Riddell Rose, Michael Rose's wife. The following June, Tourmaline purchased Mapan Energy for CAN$106 million in stock. Mapan had purchased Duvernay Oil assets in the Deep Basin and Rocky Mountain Foothills from Shell Canada.

=== Growth years ===
The Mapan deal may have foreshadowed a major 2016 acquisition, in which Tourmaline purchased a large amount of non-core Shell Canada mineral assets for nearly CAN$1.04 billion. Tourmaline gained access to 61,000 acres (25,000 ha) in Gundy area on the British Columbia-Alberta border, and 145,000 acres (59,000 ha) in the Deep Basin. The deal included developed and undeveloped land and facilities.

By 2019, Tourmaline Oil and Canadian Natural Resources were tied as Canada's largest natural gas producers. Tourmaline was expected to pass Canadian Natural Resources in 2020, after bringing a natural gas processing plant in British Columbia online. To raise additional capital and achieve what it believed was a more accurate valuation for its businesses, Tourmaline spun off a new company named Topaz Oil to a group of private investors. Topaz Oil took control of Tourmaline mineral rights on 2,200,000 acres (890,000 ha), and a 45 percent silent ownership in two Tourmaline natural gas processing plants.

Tourmaline Oil acquired in November 2020 Modern Resources in a cash and stock deal worth CAN$144 million and Jupiter Resources in an all-stock deal worth CAN$626 million. The Modern Resources transaction gave Tourmaline additional assets in the Deep Basin as well as a natural gas processing plant. The Jupiter Resources agreement added Deep Basin assets and interests in two natural gas processing plants. Along with three other acquisitions worth a total of CAN$1.53 billion, Tourmaline Oil became Canada's largest natural gas producer just as natural gas prices doubled. The company's share price rose six-fold between March 2020 and October 2021, and its market valuation rose to more than CAN$14 billion.

The company purchased three more companies, each with assets in the Montney Formation gas fields, in 2021. The largest of these were the CAN$869.5 million takeover of Black Swan Energy and the purchase of Saguaro Resources for CAN$205 million. Tourmaline acquired several other smaller firms for a total of CAN$290.6 million. In July 2021, Tourmaline signed a deal with Cheniere Energy, an American liquified natural gas (LNG) exporter. Under the agreement, Tourmaline will ship natural gas via pipeline to Cheniere's LNG plant in Corpus Christi, Texas, with shipments to begin in 2023. This makes Tourmaline the first Canadian exploration and development company to directly engage in the LNG business.

In October 2021, Tourmaline announced a major debt reduction plan and paid a CAN$223 million special dividend to shareholders.

In August 2024, Tourmaline acquired Crew Energy Inc. for CAD$1.3 Billion, including Crew's net debt estimated to be CAD$240 million. Crew Energy was a pure play Montney producer in NEBC. Tourmaline acquired assets included: Crew’s Montney area assets include Septimus / West Septimus, Tower, Groundbirch, Attachie, Oak/Flatrock and Portage and are situated in northeast British Columbia. Their operations include liquids rich natural gas and light oil production from the siltstone Montney formation. Tourmaline acquired approx. 264,000 net acres.

== Safety ==
On April 14, 2025 around 6PM one worker was fatality injured and another was hospitalized due to a line strike that occurred at the Gundy C-60 Gas Plant roughly 150km north of Fort St John.

== Fossil find ==
On October 1, 2013, a Tourmaline Oil crew was clearing land for a new pipeline near Spirit River, Alberta, when a backhoe operator uncovered a massive fossil tailbone. According to Brian Brake, executive director of the Philip J. Currie Dinosaur Museum, the remains were of a hadrosaur, and were one of the most complete fossil skeletons found in that part of the province.

== Carbon emissions ==
Tourmaline greenhouse gas emissions intensity is less than a third of that of other large Canadian petroleum companies, such as Canadian Natural Resources, Cenovus Energy, and Suncor Energy. Between 2013 and 2018, Tourmaline reduced its greenhouse gas emissions intensity by 46 percent, and was planning to reduce emissions intensity by another 25 percent by 2023. Tourmaline is a financial backer of the Natural Gas Innovation Fund (NGIF), a venture capital fund which invests in natural gas clean technology. Tourmaline's natural gas processing plant at Edson, Alberta, is the site of a CAN$35 million clean technology project, where NGIF partner companies test emissions-reduction technologies.

However, in January 2020, the Alberta Energy Regulator, a government-chartered corporation charged, in part, with enforcing the Alberta Environmental Protection and Enhancement Act, filed five charges against Tourmaline Energy and Topaz Oil over the excessive release of hydrogen sulfide on February 25, 2018, near Spirit River, Alberta. The toxic gas affected the health of local residents.
