= Zama oil field =

Oil field off Tabasco, Mexico

Coordinates: 18.927°N 92.869°W

The Zama Oil Field is an oil field located 60 km off the coast of Tabasco, Mexico, in the Block 7 of the Sureste Basin. It was discovered in July 2017 by Talos Energy’s Zama-1 well. It’s estimated to hold up to two billion barrels of oil. Zama is named after the Maya word for "dawn".

== History ==
Zama oil field was discovered by the Zama-1 well in July 2017 in the Block 7 of the Sureste Basin. It was the first exploration well to be drilled by the private sector in Mexico since the Mexican oil expropriation. Talos Energy was the operator of the project in a joint-venture with Sierra Oil & Gas and Premier Oil. In September 2018, Mexico’s National Hydrocarbons Commission approved a $325m budget for appraisal drilling at Zama. However, the presidency of López Obrador changed the approach of the Mexican government with private oil companies. Sierra Oil & Gas sold its 40% stake in Zama to Wintershall DEA, meanwhile, Premier Oil announced that its 25% stake was for sale. Talos Energy and PEMEX are in talks about a merged project in the oil field.

== Controversies ==
Mexican state-owned oil company PEMEX claims rights over the Zama discovery, as the company has drilling rights in an adjacent oil field. The Mexican company argues that the Zama deposit extends into its territory, but the firm must prove it by drilling. A third-party reservoir engineering firm concluded Talos held 49.6% of the discovery, while the remaining 50.4% was found to be in Pemex-operated areas. However, Talos CEO Tim Duncan considered that the analysis underestimated relevant data. Talos claims 59.6% of Zama.
