= Tampico-Misantla Basin =

The Tampico-Misantla Basin or TMB is a geological depression located in the North-East Mexico. The area is well-known for its oil and gas reserves and includes the Chicontepec Formation.

The TMB is located in the coastal plain of the Gulf of Mexico, extending the area 50 km to the East until shallow waters. The basin is bordered to the west by the Sierra Madre Oriental, to the north by the Tamaulipas arch, and to the south by the Teziutlán Massif.

In 2018, IHS Markit considered Tampico-Misantla Basin as a global onshore Super Basin and compared the area with the Permian Basin.

== Oil Extraction ==
Oil has been extracted from the Tampico Misantla Basin since the 1920s, accounting for 7.4 billion BOE. Meanwhile, 5.2 billion BOE remains in discovered conventional fields of the basin. The geological area contains three mature sources of rocks: the Agua Nueva Formation, the Huayacocotla Formation, and the Pimienta Formation.

Some of the most important oil fields in the zone are Chicontepec, Golden Lane, Remolino, San Andrés, Presidene Miguel Alemán, Coatzintla, Coralillo, M.A. Camacho, Coapechaca.

== See also ==
- Permian Basin
- Super Basin
- Petroleum industry in Mexico
