= Huqf Supergroup =

Mass of rock in Oman

The Huqf Supergroup of the Sultanate of Oman is a lithostratigraphic unit (volume of rock) located in Jabal Akhdar (northern Oman), Huqf area (east-central Oman), and Mirbat area of Dhofar (southern Oman) and is penetrated by boreholes in the salt basins of the Oman interior. The Supergroup is composed of the Abu Mahara Group (ca. 725 to b645 Ma), the Nafun Group (ca.b645–547 Ma), and the Ara Group (ca. 547–540 Ma). Huqf stratigraphy is divided into four tectonically and temporally distinct units: the Cryogenian Abu Mahara Group, the Ediacaran Nafun Group, and the terminal Ediacaran to early Cambrian Ara Group. The supergroup contains a record of Neoproterozoic history, such as evidence of two glaciations, a massive reorganization of the global carbon cycle, and the Ediacaran-Cambrian transition.

The Huqf Supergroup is exposed in the Jabal Akhdar of the Al Hajar Mountains, and in the deformed and metamorphosed domal culmination of the Saih Hatat.

Source rocks of the Neoproterozoic to Cambrian Huqf Supergroup are associated with most of the South Oman oils. However, the geochemical similarity of the organic matter across the Huqf sequence has impeded to assign oils to Huqf intervals.

Huqf Supergroup preserves a complete sequence of Cryogenian, Ediacaran, and early Cambrian strata, becoming the group a reference in Earth history.

== See also ==
- Super Basin
- South Oman Salt Basin
- Geological formation
