= Rub' al Khali Basin =

Large basin containing the Rub' al Khali desert

- ٱلرُّبْع ٱلْخَالِي
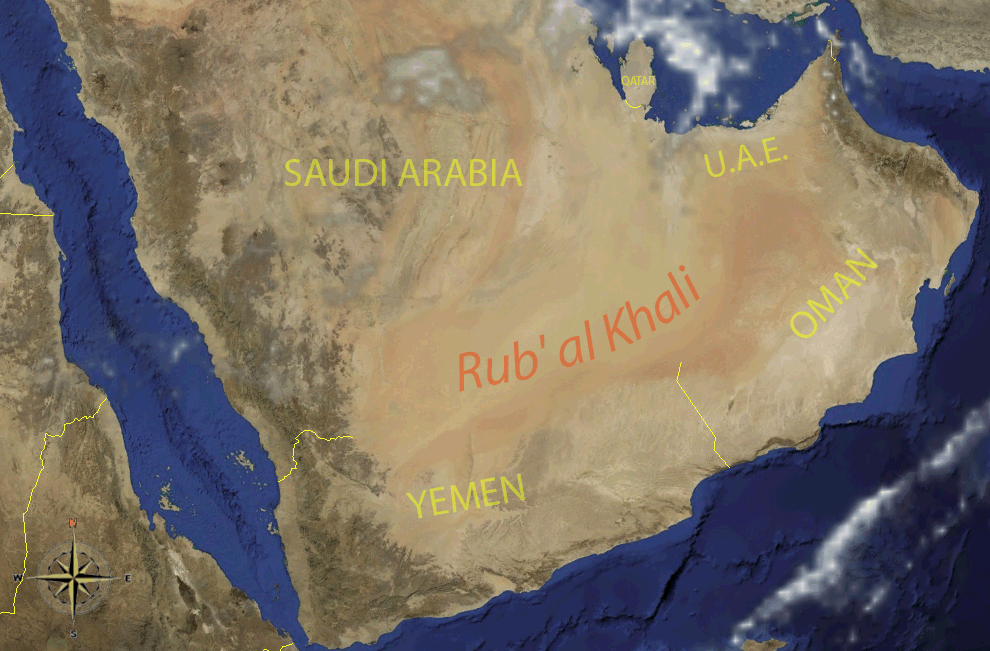
- View of the Rub' al Khali Basin

- Location within Saudi Arabia

- Tectonic elements of the Rub' al Khali Basin

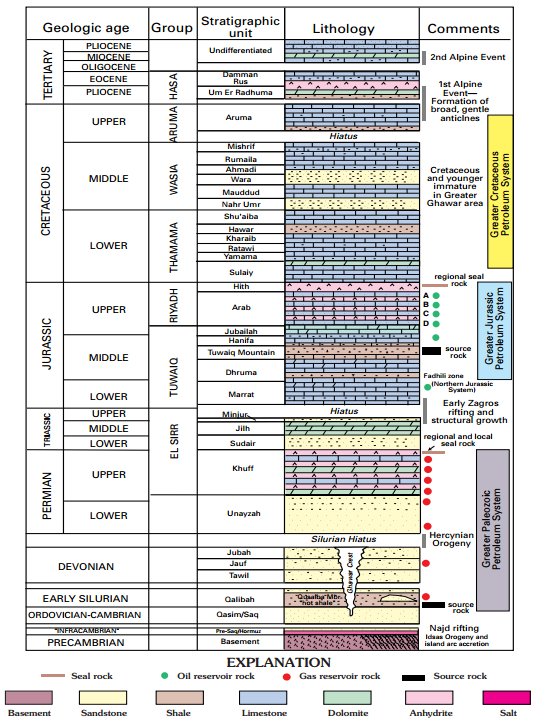
- Stratigraphic column of the eastern Arabian Peninsula
- Coordinates: 21°00′00″N 51°30′00″E
- Etymology: Arabic: "empty quarter"
- Region: Rub' al Khali
- Country: Saudi Arabia; Oman; United Arab Emirates; Yemen
- States: Eastern Province, Najran & Riyadh Regions
- Cities: Najran

Characteristics
- On/Offshore: Onshore
- Boundaries: Central Arabian Arch (N), Oman Thrust (E), Northern Hadramaut Arch (S), Arabian Shield (W)
- Part of: Arabian Desert
- Area: 560,000 km^{2} (220,000 sq mi)

Hydrology
- River: Wadis
- Lake: Occasional saline lakes

Geology
- Basin type: Active margin (early Early Cretaceous-recent); Passive margin (Early-Mid Mesozoic); Back-arc (Late Paleozoic-Early Mesozoic); Intracratonic (Proterozoic-Early Paleozoic)
- Plate: Arabian
- Orogeny: Hercynian (Paleozoic); Break-up of Pangaea (Mesozoic); Zagros-Alpine (Cenozoic)
- Age: Neoproterozoic to Holocene
- Stratigraphy: Stratigraphy
- Faults: Najd Fault System, Dibba Transform Fault
- Fields: Oil: Shaybah, Ramlah; Gas: Kidan

The Rub' al Khali Basin (ٱلرُّبْع ٱلْخَالِي) or ar-Rubʻ al-Khālī / ar-rubʿ al-ḵālī Basin, Arabic for "Empty Quarter Basin", is a major endorheic sedimentary basin of approximately 560,000 square kilometres (220,000 sq mi) in southern Saudi Arabia, northeastern Yemen, southeastern Oman and southeasternmost United Arab Emirates. The onshore foreland on Mesozoic rift basin is geographically defined by the eponymous Rub' al Khali and covers the regions of Najran and Riyadh and the Eastern Province. The basin is geologically bound by the Central Arabian Arch in the north, the Oman Thrust in the east, the Northern Hadramaut Arch in the south, and the Arabian Shield in the west. Politically, the southwestern boundary is formed by the border with Yemen and the border with Oman forms the southeastern boundary.

The stratigraphy of the basin ranges from Proterozoic to recent and comprises various cycles of clastic and carbonate sediments separated by regional unconformities. The stratigraphic column contains various levels of source rock formations, and reservoirs and seals are common in the late Paleozoic and Mesozoic succession. Traps are formed by the compression of the Oman Thrust in the east.

Compared to the petroleum-producing areas to the north of the basin, the Rub' al Khali Basin is relatively underexplored and has two producing oil fields (Shaybah and Ramlah) and a gas field; Kidan. The Total Petroleum System assessment made by the USGS in 2019 analyzed the potential of the basin, with the Silurian Qusaiba and Cretaceous Thamama/Wasia systems as most prolific.

== Stratigraphy ==
The stratigraphy of the Rub' al Khali Basin ranges from the Neoproterozoic, locally referred to as "Infracambrian", to recent deposits. The unconsolidated Quaternary cover is formed by sand dunes in various forms. Saline and freshwater lakes and ponds are rare in the region but sometimes they occur between sand dunes and barchanoid ridges.

Age	Group	Formation	Lithologies	Depositional environment	Maximum thickness	Petroleum geology	Notes
Quaternary	Alluvium		Sands, silts and conglomerates	Nonpattern dunes, sand sheets, gravel sheets, sabkhas, saline and freshwater lakes and ponds, linear sand dunes, seif dunes, barchan and mega barchan dunes, barchanoid ridges, star dunes	900 m (3,000 ft)	Overburden	
Pliocene		Dibdibba				Overburden	
Miocene		Hofuf				Overburden	
Miocene		Dam				Overburden	
Miocene		Hadrukh				Overburden	
Oligocene	Oligocene unconformity						
Eocene	Hasa	Dammam				Overburden	
Eocene	Hasa	Rus				Overburden	
Paleocene	Hasa	Umm Er Radhuma				Overburden	
Late Cretaceous	Aruma	Aruma				Reservoir, seal	
Late Cretaceous	Wasia	Mishrif - Natih				Reservoir	
Late Cretaceous	Wasia	Rumalla				Source, seal	
Late Cretaceous	Wasia	Ahmadi				Reservoir	
Late Cretaceous	Wasia	Wara				Seal	
Late Cretaceous	Wasia	Mauddud				Reservoir, seal	
Late Cretaceous	Wasia	Nahr Umr					
Early Cretaceous	Thamama	Shu'aiba				Source, reservoir	
Early Cretaceous	Thamama	Hawar					
Early Cretaceous	Thamama	Kharaib					
Early Cretaceous	Thamama	Ratawi				Reservoir	
Early Cretaceous	Thamama	Yamama					
Early Cretaceous	Thamama	Sulaiy				Source	
Late Jurassic	Riyadh	Hith				Seal	
Late Jurassic	Riyadh	Arab				Reservoir	
Middle Jurassic		Juballah				Reservoir	
Middle Jurassic		Hanifa				Reservoir	
Middle Jurassic		Tuwaiq Mountain				Source	
Early Jurassic		Dhruma				Reservoir, seal, source	
Early Jurassic		Marrat				Source	
Early Jurassic	El Sirr	Upper Minjur	Laterites	Deltaic to coastal		Reservoir	
Triassic	El Sirr	Lower Minjur	Conglomerates, sandstones and intercalated shales	Alluvial fans to shallow marine		Reservoir, seal	
Triassic	El Sirr	Jilh - Gullalah	Fine-grained clastics and dolomitic mudstones	Continental to near-shore		Reservoir	
Triassic	El Sirr	Sudair	Silty and gypsiferous shales	Shallow marine		Source	
Permian		Khuff	Dolomites, limestones, sandstones, shales, evaporites	Shallow marine to intertidal	900 m (3,000 ft)	Reservoir, seal, source	
Late Carboniferous		Unayzah				Reservoir, source, seal	
Early-Mid Carboniferous	Pre-Unayzah unconformity						
Devonian		Jubah					
Devonian		Jauf				Source	
Devonian		Tawil				Seal	
Silurian		Qalibah - Sharawra				Reservoir	
Silurian		Qusaiba	Black shale			Source, seal	
Ordovician		Qasim					
Turongian		Saq					
Turongian	Pre-Saq unconformity						
Early-Mid Cambrian	Huqf	Ara	Halite			Seal	
Neoproterozoic	Huqf	Jubaylah	Metasediments				

== Basin evolution ==
The overall history of the Rub' al Khali Basin goes back to the Proterozoic ("Precambrian"). The first regional tectonic signature in history is recorded as the end-Ediacaran unconformity, followed by the pre-Siq unconformity affecting the western and southwestern edges of the basin. Throughout the earlier periods of the Paleozoic, the intracratonic basin went through an extensional tectonic phase, which ended with a regional Carboniferous unconformity, representing the Hercynian orogenic compressional stage. From the Early Permian onwards, the basin experienced back-arc extension on the edge of Gondwana, leading to the formation of the regional Khuff Formation with anhydrite and halite deposition. This tectonic regime gradually transitioned into a passive margin setting with the opening of the Neo-Tethys in the Early Triassic.

During the early Mesozoic, this tectonic quiescent stage remained active, laying down the majority of the sedimentary sequence, including the main reservoirs of the succession. Following the tectonic subsidence at the border of the shallow Tethys Ocean, the basin experienced its first compressional stage in the earliest Early Cretaceous, represented to the south of the basin by the Northern Hadramaut Arch. To the east of the Rub' al-Khali Basin, this resulted in the obduction of the Semail Ophiolite, an oceanic crustal sequence which today is widely studied in the Oman Mountains. Two stages of tectonic uplift are noted towards the end of the Cenomanian (around 94 Ma, close to the Cenomanian-Turonian turnover) and in the middle Santonian, approximately 80 Ma. This phase of ophiolite obduction lasted until Middle to Late Eocene times. The active compression caused by the Alpine orogeny and represented in the Middle Eastern territories by the Zagros fold and thrust belt, continued in the late Paleogene and Neogene, with the main phase of uplift lasting from about 25 to 18 Ma. The Quaternary overburden section of the active margin stage of the basin contains sands, silts, clays, and conglomerates deposited in sand dunes (ergs) and sabkhas. The sequence is disturbed by the impact of various meteorites in a series of craters known as the Wabar craters.

== Petroleum geology ==
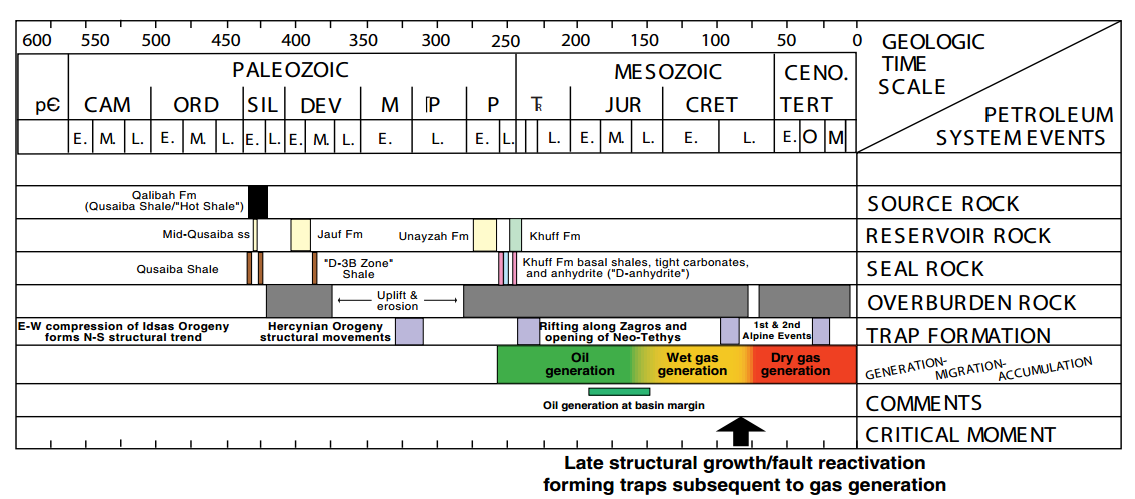
Petroleum systems events chart for central Arabia

Petroleum exploration in Saudi Arabia commenced in 1937 with the acquisition of seismic surveys, continuing until the end of the 20th century. This has resulted in almost complete coverage of the main producing areas. One of the most successful methods used is the long-range refraction profile using the Hith anhydrite as the refractor.

The Rub' al Khali Basin comprises various petroleum systems, defined as Total Petroleum Systems (TPS) by the United States Geological Survey (USGS), from most to least extensive in the basin:

1. Silurian Qusaiba (201903)
2. Cretaceous Thamama/Wasia (201901)
3. Jurassic Hanifa/Diyab-Arab (201902)
4. Arabian Sub-Basin Tuwaiq/Hanifa-Arab (202102)
5. Central Arabia Qusaiba-Paleozoic (202101)
6. North Oman Huqf-Shu'aiba (201601)
7. North Oman Huqf/'Q'-Haushi (201401)
8. Middle Cretaceous Natih (201602)

The North Oman Huqf/'Q'-Haushi TPS extends diagonally across the central portion of the Makaram-Mabrouk high portion of the Central Oman Platform, into the Ghaba Salt Basin.

The main total petroleum system of the basin centers around the Ordovician to Silurian Qusaiba Formation as source rock, charging the Permian Khuff Formation, with minor reservoirs the Silurian Tawil, Devonian Jubah and Carboniferous Unayzah Formations, all sealed by overlying shaly and evaporite levels, with as main regional seal the evaporites of the Khuff. Structural traps are formed by the compression from the east during the Late Cretaceous and Paleogene to Neogene. The critical moment for oil has been estimated to the Jurassic-Cretaceous boundary and for gas during the Late Cretaceous.

=== Petroleum exploration and production ===
Oil exploration work started in the Rub' al Khali Basin in the 1950s. Until 1990, only two oil fields were discovered by Saudi Aramco, the Shaybah and Ramlah Field, adjacent to the border with Abu Dhabi. The estimated original recoverable oil reserves of the Shaybah Field, which was discovered in 1968 are 1.828 billion barrels. The reservoir for both fields is in the Lower Cretaceous Shu'aiba Formation. In addition to the discovery of those two oil fields, the Kidan gas field was discovered in the same area in 1967. Gas accumulations were found in the Arab C, D, and Jubaila Formations of the Jurassic. The estimated recoverable gas reserves of this field are 3.3 billion cubic metres.

A 2019 USGS study on the basin concluded that the Rub' al Khali Basin could contain 242 undiscovered oil fields, ranging from 0.64 to 1,300 million cubic metres (4 to 8,192 million barrels) of oil, and a mean number of 267 gas fields with estimated volumes between 0.68 and 2,800 billion cubic metres (24 and 98,304 billion cubic feet) .

== See also ==
- Ghawar Field
- Arabian or Persian Gulf Basin

General geology

- Geology of Saudi Arabia
- Geology of Oman
- Geology of the United Arab Emirates
- Geology of Yemen
