= Abu Mahara Group =

The Abu Mahara Group (c. 725–<645 Ma) is a geologic group of formations that are spread across northern Oman (Jabal Akhdar), east-central Oman (Huqf area), and southern Oman (Mirbat area of Dhofar). It belongs to the Huqf Supergroup.

The group hosts two glacial successions in the Ghubrah and Fiq formations. Geologists have found Neoproterozoic glacial deposits in the Abu Mahara Group in the Jabal Akhdar of the Oman Mountains.

Geoscientists of Petroleum Development Oman (PDO) redefined the Abu Mahara Group as comprising a lower Ghadir Manqil Formation and an upper Masirah Bay Formation.
