= Dos Bocas oil fire =

Environmental catastrophe in Mexico

Coordinates: 21°31′33.8″N 97°37′57.98″W

The Dos Bocas oil fire occurred in Ozuluama de Mascareñas, in the Mexican state of Veracruz, in 1908 when the oil well San Diego del Mar number 3 erupted into flames, spilling the equivalent of thousands of oil barrels that severely affected the environment and makes it one of the worse environmental catastrophes in the oil industry. The fire lasted almost two months and has permanently left two giant craters in the ground leaving "Two Mouths".

== History of oil in Veracruz ==
Foreign oil extraction which began in 1900 was dominated by American and European powers alike. Each time one of these new powers entered an area, like Veracruz, they would ultimately disrupt the local wildlife, alter the landscape, and affect how society was structured as well. The oil companies would then make their own type of society that would not only affect how people would interact with each other, but how the locals would interact with the environment around them as well. A major factor that changed their society was that the oil companies were able to put a price on the locals land. This made the people uneasy at the time and did not trust the companies at first, but with very high offers on their land, the people could not refuse. Once they acquired the land, they built major infrastructure like wells, refineries, living quarters for the workers, etc..

At first the companies were hesitant in laying down pipelines, until it started to rain oil from the wells. Oil would cover entire areas with this black gold they had found and when they would work on installing the pipelines, oil would still rain down from the wells. These open wells, or pits, as they called them would reach depths as much as seven to thirty feet deep. Having these pits open would be a dangerous move because they could easily catch fire at any moment.

== The fire ==
In 1901 the Pennsylvania Oil Company, of Mexico, bought the land rights and drilled a well into the nearby lagoon called Dos Bocas, with no success in completely drilling the well. The English division of S. Pearson and Son then acquired the land rights in 1908 and decided to continue drilling the well in the lagoon. During the drilling process, the pressure in the well became powerful enough to burst through the ground, gushing oil out of the well. Pressure in the well was so great that it blew a second hole nearby. The oil was then ignited by the flames that powered the oil derrick that was lifting the drill. The fire was so bright that it could be seen 200 miles away from the ocean. Ultimately, the Dos Bocas blowout ended up being one of the largest oil spills in the history of the oil industry. It was impossible to stop the flow of oil because the well casing had been blown off during the gush. The well itself kept pouring out oil at a rate of 90,000 barrels per day. The fire lasted almost two months from July 4 1908 to August 30 1908

The heat exacerbated the difficulties workers faced when trying to stop the flow of oil. Temperatures were high which caused those working to put out the fire and contain the spill to be unable to go closer than a few hundred feet. The oil coming out was a 200-foot tall (61 m) column and the fire burned at over 1,000 °F (538 °C). Seventeen miles (27 km) away from the fire, town residents said that they were able to read a newspaper at night by the light of the flames. Extinguishing the flames was not an easy task. With the lack of technology to put out this enormous fire, the Mexican government sent 400 soldiers to combat against the fire. Oil was leaking out into the nearby fields and swamps and had to act as fast as they can. The soldiers used a centrifugal pump to suck the oil out and used 3,000 tons of gravel and sand to snuff the fire out. After the fire was extinguished by naturally losing its oil, two billion gallons of oils that was worth twenty five million dollars leaked from the well.

== See also ==
- List of environmental disasters
- Oil in Mexico
- Oil spill
