= Pemex =

Mexican state-owned petroleum corporation

Petróleos Mexicanos
- Type: State-owned corporation
- Industry: Oil and gas
- Founded: June 7, 1938; 88 years ago
- Founder: Lázaro Cárdenas government
- Headquarters: Mexico City, Mexico
- Key people: Juan Carlos Carpio
- Products: Fuel, natural gas and other petrochemicals
- Revenue: ▲US$ 96.979 billion (2023)
- Net income: ▲US$ 9.204 billion (2023)
- Total assets: ▲US$ 136.068 billion (2023)
- Total equity: ▲US$ 97.635 billion (2023)
- Owner: Mexican Government
- Number of employees: 128,616 (2023)
- Website: pemex.com

Pemex (a portmanteau of Petróleos Mexicanos, which translates to Mexican Petroleum in English; Spanish pronunciation: [ˈpemeks]) is the Mexican state-owned petroleum corporation managed and operated by the Mexican government. It was formed in 1938 by nationalization and expropriation of all private oil companies in Mexico at the time of its formation, making PEMEX an enduring symbol of Mexican nationalism. Pemex had total assets worth $101.8 billion in December 2019 and as of 2009 was Latin America's second-largest enterprise by annual revenue, surpassed only by Petrobras (the Brazilian national oil company). The company is the seventh-most polluting in the world according to The Guardian.

== History ==
Asphalt and pitch had been worked in Mexico since the time of the Aztecs. Small quantities of oil were first refined into kerosene around 1876 near Tampico. By the early 20th century, commercial quantities of oil were being extracted and refined by subsidiaries of the British Pearson and American Doheny companies and had attracted the attention of the Mexican government who then claimed all mineral rights for the state as part of its Constitution.

In 1938, President Lázaro Cárdenas (1934–40) sided with oil workers striking against foreign-owned oil companies for an increase in pay and social services. On March 18, 1938, citing Article 27 of the Constitution of 1917, President Cárdenas embarked on the state-expropriation of all resources and facilities, nationalizing the United States and Anglo–Dutch operating companies. He is famous in saying in his speech addressing the nation,

I ask the entire nation to furnish the necessary moral and material support to face the consequences of a decision which we, of our own free will, would neither have sought nor desired.

Pemex was established by Cárdenas's decree of June 7, 1938.

He framed expropriation as a necessary national response to the injustice of the operations of foreign companies operating on Mexican soil. Expropriation was not outright confiscation since the Mexican government promised to compensate companies. However, in retaliation, many foreign governments closed their markets to Mexican oil until the Allies demand for petroleum in World War II caused the boycott to be dropped. In spite of the early boycott, Pemex developed into one of the largest oil companies in the world.

In an interview on the oil news website in November 2005, a Pemex employee spoke anonymously of the company's inability to grow production, stating that the company and country is at Hubbert's Peak. The person interviewed believed export levels could not be recovered once peak had passed, as the size of current fields that have been discovered or are coming online represent a fraction of the size of the oilfields going into terminal decline. Annual production has dropped each year between 2004 and 2007. Furthermore, it has been reported the 2005–2006 daily oil production was down by approximately 500,000 barrels per day (79,000 m^{3}/d) (a large proportion of the country's 4,500,000 barrels) on the previous year. Pemex averaged 3.71 MMBPD in 2006. Pemex has never produced 4 MMBPD or higher for a yearly average. Pemex was replaced as Latin America's largest company by Petrobras, according to a Latin Business Chronicle ranking of Latin America's Top 500 companies.

To help capitalize the company, former President Vicente Fox brought forward the possibility of making shares of Pemex available to Mexican citizens and pension funds, to complement a current project-specific investment setup known as "Proyectos de Inversión Diferida En El Registro del Gasto" (Deferred Investment Projects in the Expenditure Registry). The proposal, which intended to alleviate Pemex's tax burden and create a substantial budget increase, met opposition in Congress. President Felipe Calderón made clear at the beginning of his presidency that he would try his best to open up the sector to private investment. Pemex is Latin America's second-largest company measured by revenues, according to a ranking of the region's 500 largest companies by Latin Business Chronicle, behind Brazilian oil company Petrobras. In June 2009, Pemex has asked for an extra $1.5 billion state aid to finance oil fields investments, reported Bloomberg.

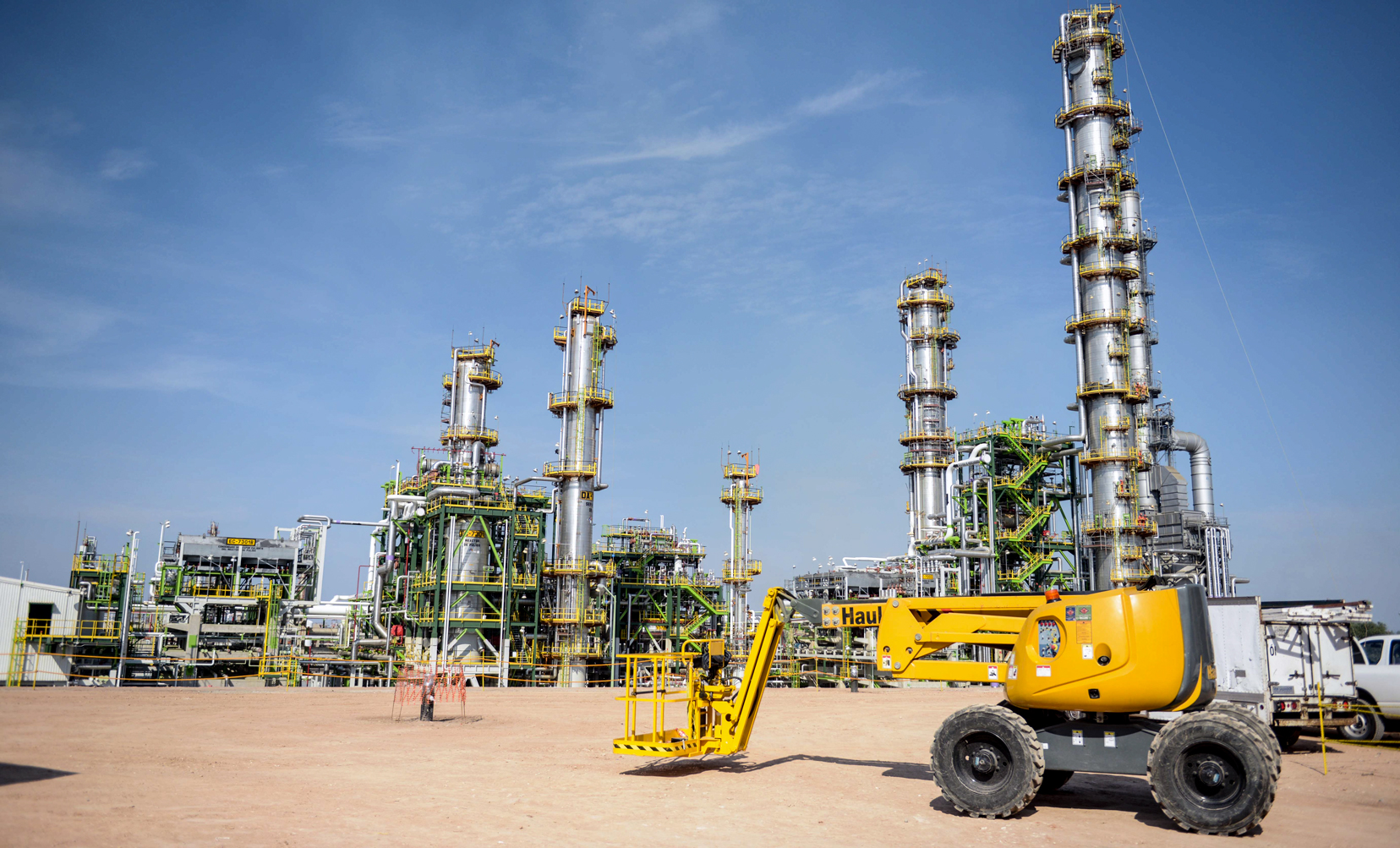
Pemex refinery in Tula de Allende, Hidalgo

President Calderón called for a change in Mexico's oil industry after output at Pemex fell at the fastest rate since 1942. His comments came after Petrobras and London-based BP said they made a "giant" oil find of as much as 3 billion barrels (480×10^{6} m^{3}) in the Gulf of Mexico, southeast of Houston. According to Mexican Energy Minister Georgina Kessel, Mexico may seek to emulate Brazilian Oil rules that strengthened Petroleo Brasileiro SA as it considers regulation changes to revive the oil industry.

In January 2014, Pemex signed a cooperation agreement with the Russian oil company Lukoil focusing on oil production and field exploration as well as exchange of knowledge in the aforementioned areas, including actions for ecological preservation and environmental protection. In February 2016, Emilio Lozoya Austin stepped down as CEO of Pemex and was replaced by José Antonio González Anaya. On November 27, 2017, José Antonio González Anaya was appointed to be the Secretary of Finance and Public Credit. Carlos Alberto Treviño Medina was appointed CEO, sequentially.

In July 2021, it was announced that PEMEX.UL for liquefied petroleum gas (LPG) distribution was to be created. Even though Pemex is highly indebted, it is still determined to assist the poor that are affected by the rising energy prices. In an unexpected turn of events, Pemex saw profits of $719 million in the second quarter of 2021. Also in July 2021, the SENER appointed Pemex as the operator for the Zama oil field which was originally discovered by Talos Energy in 2017. The two companies shall work together for the final development of Zama. In September that year, Talos disputed the governments decision, since Pemex doesn't have the required $2 billion for the oil fields development.

With debts still at over $100 billion by September 2021, Pemex and the finance ministry of Mexico's relationship was strengthened as the government decided to continue to support the company, but would not change the laws in order to directly reflect their debt. some speculation was made that the government may use International Monetary Fund (IMF) money to lighten Pemex's debt. Budget increases of 17% over 2021 amounts were proposed, with a 14% reduction of its profit-sharing duties, for 2022's exploration and production processes.

An agreement between Pemex and Braskem (BRKM5.SA) was reached in September 2021 for a new gas supply agreement and also to build a $400 million ethane terminal to be located in Laguna de Pajaritos, in Coatzacoalcos, Veracruz. In October 2021, Pemex was in debt with a recorded loss of $3.7 billion in profits for the third quarter compared to the previous year. In the last quarter of 2021, production was 4.5% higher than that of the last quarter of 2020. Due to tax payments and the currency being weak against the dollar, Pemex still reported a net loss of $6.05 billion. In order to reduce the debt Pemex is working on a plan to domestically refine its oil and reduce exports by 2023. In 2021, an investment of $21,000 million was made for the construction of an industrial plant at the Dos Bocas refinery. As part of the plan to sore up Pemex, President Andrés Manuel López Obrador purchased the Deer Park plant in the Huston Ship Channel for $600 million. The plant has the capacity to process 340,000 barrels per day.

On February 23, 2023, three major fires broke out at three different Mexico and U.S. operated Pemex facilities. In March 2023, Pemex and U.S. based, Talos Energy submitted to develop an offshore oil field. The two companies have been partnered since 2022. The platform that was submitted was for two offshore platforms and 46 wells with oil and gas from Zama would filter into the Pemex-run terminal at Dos Bocas. In June 2023, Pemex received bids for the renewal of the Dos Bocas wastewater treatment plant (PTE) which was originally built in 1970 and is no longer capable of treating the oily waters. Pemex's credit rating changed to from stable to negative in July 2023 due to the ongoing debt accumulation. The government assistance from President Andrés Manuel López Obrador is said to likely continue until the end of his term in 2024. In September 2023, it was announced that Pemex would receive capital allocations from the federal government of Mexico to assist in paying off over $11 million in accumulated debt.

In 2024, the industrial plant at Dos Bocas opened and was operating at 60% capacity, transforming 340,000 barrels per day of crude oil into fuels. The Finance Ministry of Mexico provided a $12 billion debt offering to Pemex in July 2025 involving per-capitalised securities for upcoming 2025-2026 debt payments. In September 2025, it was announced that Mexico would include $14 billion in 2026 to pay Pemex debts. In 2026, Pemex announced that it would begin hydraulic fracturing of its own reserves for the extraction of natural gas. The company plans to spend 34% more than in 2025 in order to increase crude output to 1.8 million barrels per day and expand natural gas production to 4.5 billion cubic feet per day by 2030.

== Operation ==
=== Exploration ===
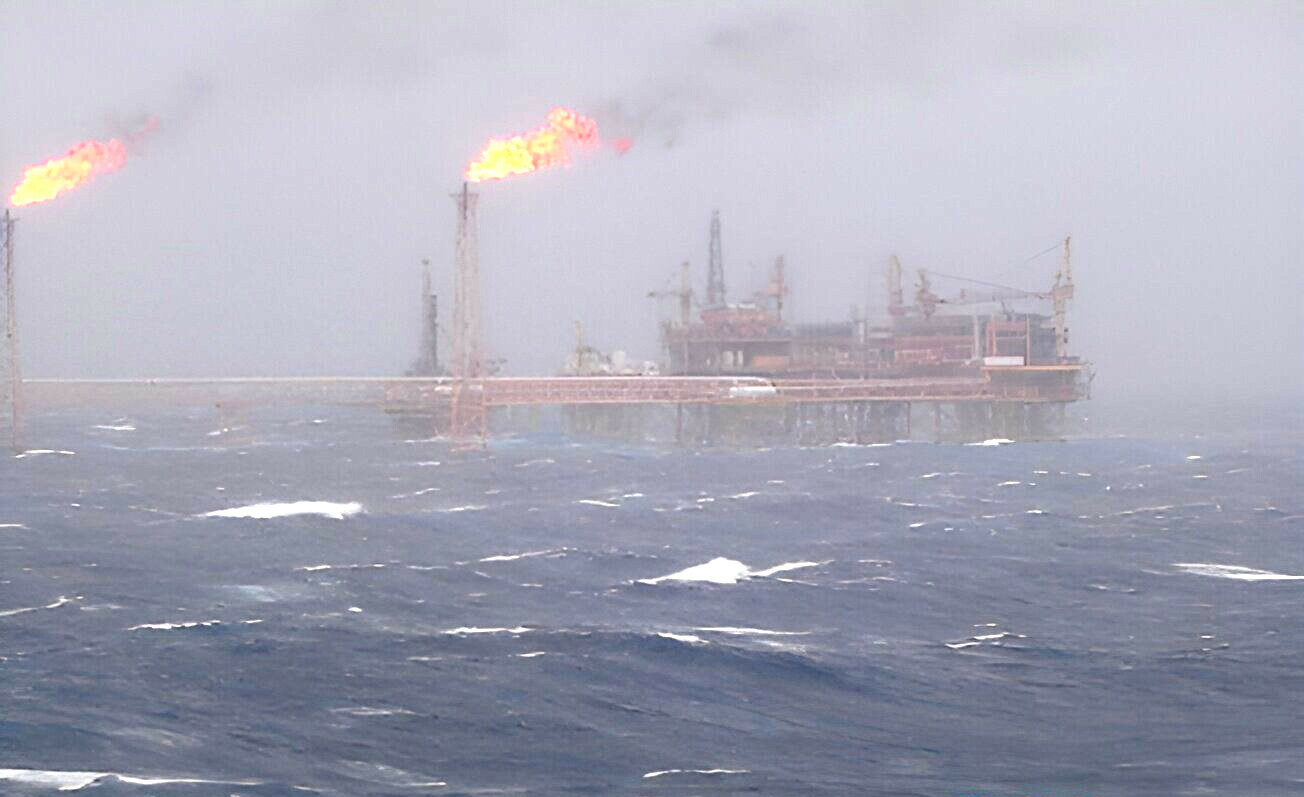
Cantarell Field

Proponents of Calderón's energy policy stated that Pemex lacks the equipment, technology and financial means to explore for new reserves in deep water or shale gas; hence, a reform to Mexican law is needed. In addition to failing infrastructure, dwindling reserves have created urgency in completing some type of reform. Only 20% of Mexico has been extensively explored for further reserves and it has been argued that Pemex will need help in some form of foreign investment to successfully explore new reserves, including in the Gulf of Mexico.

In February 2015, the board approved a $4.16 billion spending cut, pulling the company's budget down 11.5 percent from the 2015 budget approved by Mexico's congress. The company also said it will delay deepwater exploration plans and cut jobs in response to weak oil prices. In December 2019, the company stated the discovery of a deposit in southeastern Mexico that could produce 500 million barrels of crude, the largest discovery in more than 30 years.

=== Financial status ===
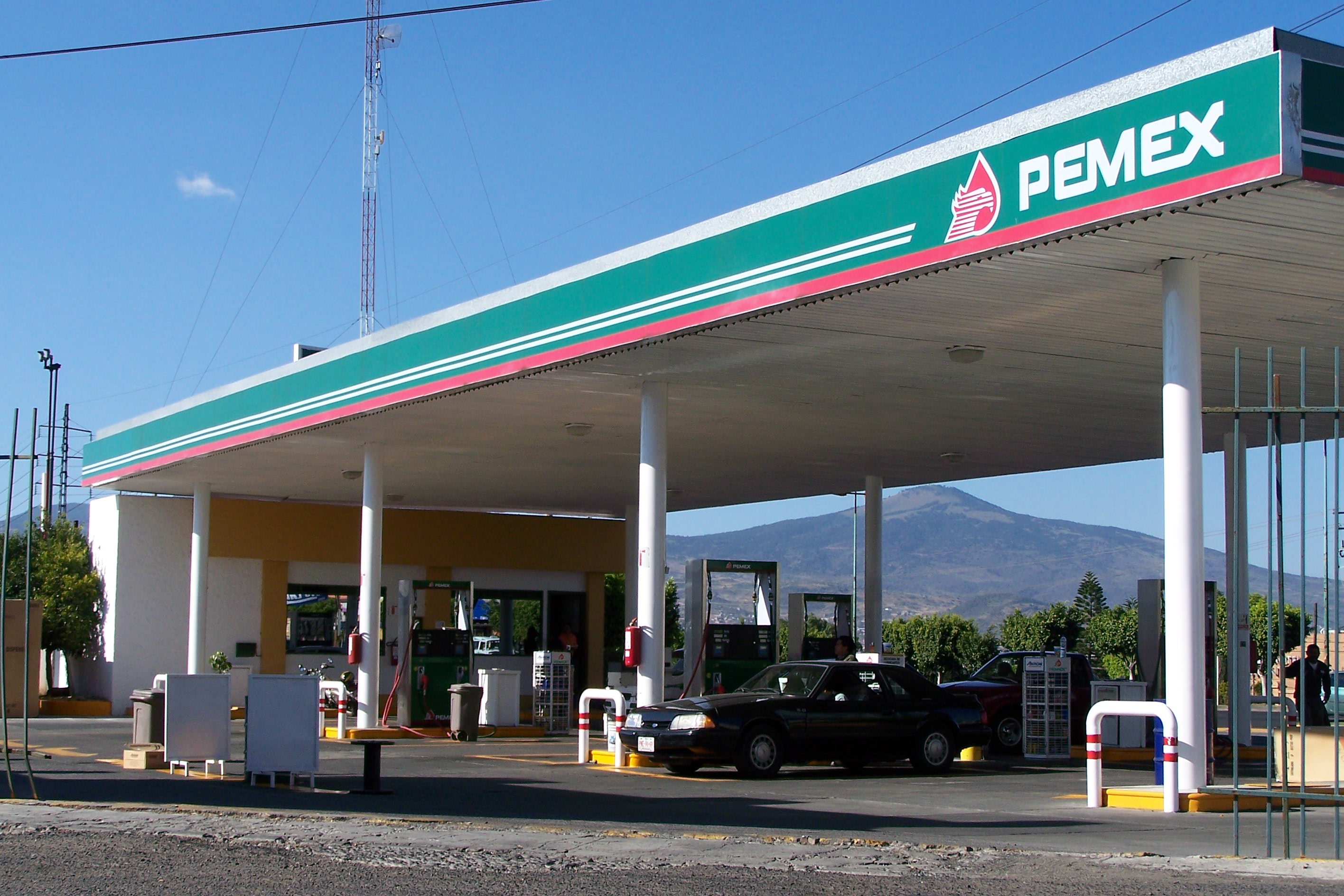
Pemex gas station in Morelia, Michoacán

Taxes on Pemex revenue provide about a third of all tax revenue collected by the Mexican government. Pemex has debt of $42.5 billion, including $24 billion in off-balance-sheet debt. The state-owned company pays out over 60% of its revenue in royalties and taxes. Mexico exports crude oil, but imports more expensive gasoline. National Hydrocarbons Commission, created in 2008 by the Mexican Congress to increase regulatory oversight, has increased scrutiny over Pemex in 2012.

As of July 2019, Pemex is the most indebted oil company in the world.

== Incidents and controversies ==
=== Incidents ===
In 1979, Pemex's Ixtoc 1 exploratory oil well in the Bay of Campeche suffered a blowout resulting in one of the largest oil spills in history. Pemex spent $100 million to clean up the spill and avoided most compensation claims by asserting sovereign immunity as a state-run company.

On November 19, 1984, a series of BLEVE's at a Pemex LPG storage facility occur in the heavily populated outskirts of San Juan Ixhuatepec, near Mexico City, resulting in the deaths of around 500-600 residents and up to 7000 injured by the explosions, ensuing fire and shrapnel from exploding tanks. It is considered among the deadliest industrial accidents in world history. Pemex was blamed for a series of 1992 gas explosions in Guadalajara.

On September 19, 2012, an explosion at the Pemex gas plant in Reynosa, Tamaulipas killed 30 and injured 46 people. Pemex Director Juan Jose Suarez said that there was "no evidence that it was a deliberate incident, or some kind of attack". On January 31, 2013, an explosion occurred at the administrative offices of Pemex in Mexico City. At least 37 people were killed and at least 126 were injured. The cause has not been confirmed. Local media reported that machinery exploded in the basement of an administrative center next door to the 52-story Pemex tower.

On April 1, 2015, a fire occurred on platform Abkatun A in the southern Gulf of Mexico which killed 4 workers. On April 20, 2016, a large explosion and fire at the company's Chlorinate 3 plant in Coatzacoalcos killed at least 28 people. On September 24, 2016, a fire broke out on the oil tanker "Burgos", off the coast of Boca del Río, Veracruz, forcing all the crew (31 members) to be evacuated safely. The tanker was carrying 80,000 barrels of diesel and 70,000 barrels of gasoline.

On January 18, 2019, an explosion occurred on a pipeline passing through the village of Tlauhuelilpan, Hidalgo killing at least 137 people. Several hundred people were gathering around an illegal pipe drain in order to get fuel. Images of the event shows people collecting fuel with buckets and small containers from a waterfall of gasoline. Military and police forces were present during the event for several hours before the explosion but were unable to stop the people from stealing fuel. The pipeline was not closed on time even after the fuel drain was reported.

On July 2, 2021, a natural gas pipeline owned by Pemex burst in the Gulf of Mexico. The natural gas was then ignited, causing a "fireball" to appear on the water's surface. The blaze was extinguished with nitrogen after approximately five hours. With two explosions at offshore platforms during the summer of 2021, Pemex's security and maintenance procedures are being questioned. On August 24, 2021, an oil rig fire killed five workers. On July 7, 2023, an explosion followed by a fire on the Nohoch Alfa oil platform offshore Campeche in the Gulf of Mexico. The incident was classified as "serious". There were 180 workers on the platform. Two people were killed, another was missing, several were injured. The platform personnel have been evacuated. On April 6, 2024, an explosion followed by a fire on the Akal Bravo oil platform in the Gulf of Mexico. The incident was classified as "serious". There were 28 workers on the platform. There was one person killed and at least 13 others were injured

=== Controversies ===
In 2009, the U.S. Justice Department reported that some U.S. refineries had bought millions of dollars' worth of oil stolen from Mexican government pipelines. Criminals, especially drug gangs, tap remote pipelines and sometimes build their own pipelines to siphon off hundreds of millions of dollars' worth of oil each year. One oil executive has been charged and has pleaded guilty to conspiracy charges. The U.S. Homeland Security Department will return $2.4 million to Mexico's tax administration—the first money seized during a binational investigation into smuggled oil that authorities expect to lead to more arrests and seizures. In 2010 the former president of Houston-based Trammo Petroleum was sentenced to three years of probation and fined $10,000 after pleading guilty to conspiracy to receive stolen goods.

Pemex has a long history of alleged violation of human and labour rights regarding engineers, unrightfully considered to be "trusted workers" who have tried to unionize since 1995 and succeeded, after several repression episodes, in doing so in 2008 and 2009, although at a high human cost. This included the death of a person who was refused medical service at one of Pemex's hospitals because his son had just been sacked for belonging to this union, the Unión Nacional de Técnicos y Profesionistas (shorthand UNTyPP). It also included forcing union members to resign from the Union from their hospital beds, as happened to three cancer patients in 2009. Up to date and in spite of pressure by the Mexican Congress, the International Labour Organization, the Global Compact, the Industrial Global Union and thousands of citizens all over the world, workers fired in 2002, 2004, 2008, 2009, 2010 and 2011 have not been all reinstated nor has there been any other reparation. Pemex has denied these accusations.

On November 10, 2019, the institution suffered a cyber attack and its computers were infected with DoppelPaymer ransomware.

In November 2021, the arrest of former CEO Carlos Trevino was ordered after he did not show for his hearing, in which he was being charged with criminal association and money laundering. Testimony was presented by other ex-CEO, Emilio Lozoya, who was initially placed in witness protection. In January 2022, Lozoya was formally charged with money laundering, bribery and criminal association, which could amount to 39 years in prison.

==== Corruption ====
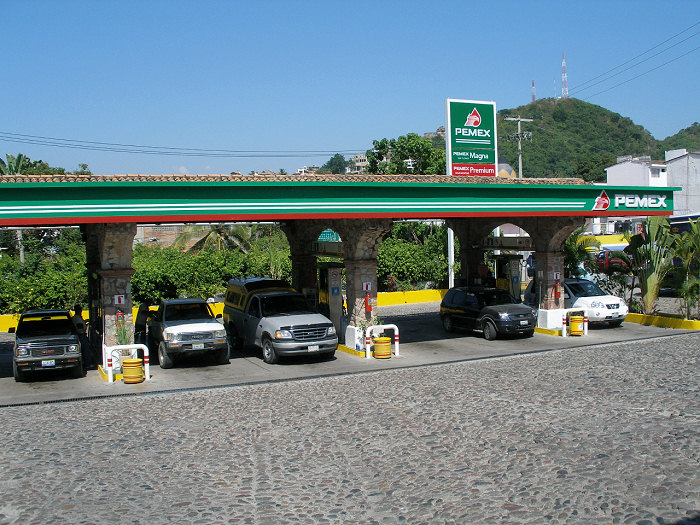
A Pemex gas station in Puerto Vallarta, Jalisco, Mexico

There have been various allegations of corruption in Pemex for over a decade. These range from political contributions to the Institutional Revolutionary Party (PRI) (over $200 million), "no show" jobs – individuals who receive a salary while performing no duties – various forms of fraud, embezzlement and even under-the-table fuel sales. It has been estimated these various forms of corruption contribute to the loss of over $1 billion a year.

Odebrecht is a Brazilian conglomerate that like Pemex also operates in the field of petroleum. Back in 2010–2012, Emilio Lozoya Austin was part of the PRI's team supporting Enrique Peña Nieto (EPN) in his presidential campaign. After EPN won the elections, Lozoya was promoted to director of Pemex, a role in which he served for most of EPN's presidency. In 2017, Brazilian newspaper O Globo claimed that Odebrecht helped finance EPN's presidential campaign, by giving $10 million to Emilio Lozoya as a bribe during times close to the 2012 elections. Soon after EPN won the elections in 2012, Lozoya became a director of Pemex and Odebrecht "won" huge contracts from Pemex and the Mexican government.

The news of the controversy surfaced in 2017, revealing Lozoya bought a $38 million house with a single payment even before he was named a director of Pemex. Such a house did not fit with his salary at the time. In October 2017, it was confirmed by the presidency that EPN himself also met with Odebrecht four times during his presidential campaign. This directly tied EPN into the scandal, albeit EPN claimed not to have received any bribes. A document from Brazil reported Lozoya received $5 million in November 2014.

Santiago Nieto, in charge of the Fiscalía Especializada para la Atención de los Delitos Electorales (FEPADE), an office in charge of investigating electoral crimes, was controversially fired soon after the Odebrecht scandal began. He was said to be receiving too much pressure from EPN and Lozoya to stop the investigation. The firing was criticized by ex-president Felipe Calderon's wife and independent 2018 presidential candidate Margarita Zavala.

President Peña Nieto said that Santiago Nieto's reinstatement depended on the Mexican Senate. Weeks earlier, the political organization Borde Político had published an evaluation in which 116 of Mexico's 128 senators received failing scores based on its legislative performance indicators.

== See also ==
- Petroleum industry in Mexico
- San Juanico disaster
- Santa Rosa de Lima Cartel
