= Latin Business Chronicle =

Latin Trade Business Intelligence, formerly Latin Business Chronicle (LBC) is a weekly online journal on Latin American business and technology.

== Profile ==
LBC, a unit of Latin Trade Group, was first published in 2001. It has around 17,000 readers per month. The magazine is headquartered in Miami, Florida. The Spanish version of the magazine was started in 2011. In 2014 the magazine was renamed as Latin Trade Business Intelligence.

== Indexes ==
LBC publishes rankings of Latin America's top 500 companies, top 25 businesspeople, top 25 businesswomen, top 100 insurance companies, top 60 employers, top 50 airports and top 50 ports, as well as several business indexes related to Latin America. The magazine started the lists of the most powerful Latin American businessmen and businesswomen in 2009.

=== Latin Business Index ===
The Latin Business Index measures the overall business climate in 19 Latin American countries using 27 subcategories ranging from GDP growth and inflation to competitiveness and political outlook. Panama tops the ranking, with Venezuela in last place.

=== Latin Security Index ===
The Latin Security Index measures security for multinational executives in Latin America. Costa Rica ranks as the safest country, while Haiti is the most dangerous in the index developed by FTI Consulting for Latin Business Chronicle.

=== Latin Technology Index ===
The Latin Technology Index measures technology level in 19 Latin American countries. Uruguay tops the ranking, while Cuba comes in last.

=== Latin Tax Index ===
The Latin Tax Index measures the tax environment in 18 Latin American countries. Chile tops the ranking, while Brazil comes in last.

=== Latin Tourism Index ===
The Latin Tourism Index measures the tourism impact on the economy in 15 Latin American countries. Uruguay tops the ranking, while Brazil comes in last.

=== Latin Globalization Index ===
The Latin Globalization Index is a relative measure of the extent of globalization of 19 Latin American countries, based on six key indicators. Panama tops the ranking, while Brazil comes in last place.
