= South Oman Salt Basin =

The South Oman Salt Basin is a sedimentary basin in Oman, at the southeastern edge of the Arabian Peninsula. It is one of the oldest commercial deposits in the world. Its oil is associated with source rocks of the Neoproterozoic to Cambrian age Huqf Supergroup.

In 1937, the first operating license in South Oman was awarded to Petroleum Development Oman and Dhofar. In 1976, the discovery of moveable oil in Nasir-1 boosted the carbonate intrasalt stringer exploration. As the difficulty in delivering expected reserves was greater than expected, operations went dormant in 1986.
