= Petroleum industry in Mexico =

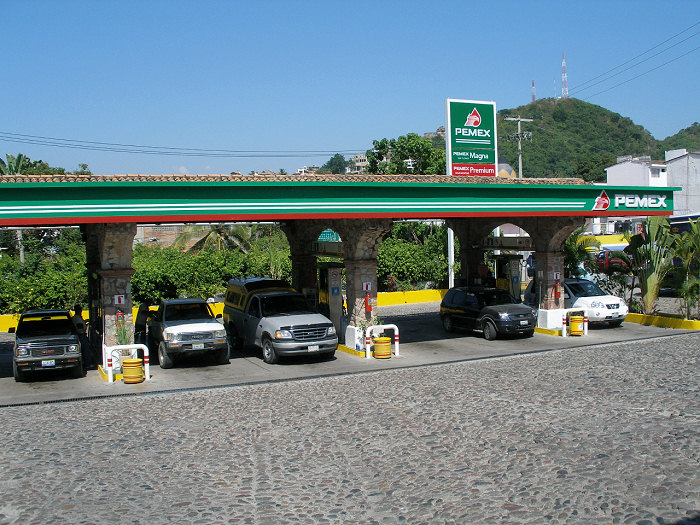
A gas station in Puerto Vallarta

History of oil production in Mexico

The petroleum industry in Mexico makes Mexico the eleventh largest producer of oil in the world and the thirteenth largest in terms of net exports. Mexico has the seventeenth largest oil reserves in the world, and it is the fourth largest oil producer in the Western Hemisphere behind the United States, Canada and Brazil. Mexico is a member of OPEC+ and the United States–Mexico–Canada Agreement.

The petroleum sector is a significant contributor to the Mexican economy, with oil revenues generating almost 7% of Mexico's export earnings. In 2014, income from the petroleum sector made up 33% of public sector income, and taxes on the revenues of the state-owned oil company Petróleos Mexicanos (Pemex) formed roughly 20% of all tax revenues collected by the Mexican government in 2022.

While a significant contributor to the overall Mexican economy, the industry has been criticized as a driver of pollution and environmental destruction. In some cases, residents of extraction zones have expressed negative opinions regarding the effects that the oil industry has on their community. In addition to this, issues such as corruption and fuel theft hinder operational efficiency.

== History ==
=== Development before 1938 ===
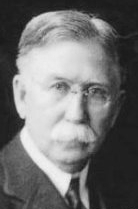
Edward L. Doheny, California oil entrepreneur in Mexico

Petroleum was known in Mexico before the arrival of the Spaniards and used by the natives for incense and to repair canoes. In Mexico's colonial era (1521–1821), ranchers lost cattle to tar pits in the Gulf Coast Region, so it was considered more of a hazard than a valuable resource. Exploratory wells were first drilled in Mexico in 1869 by U.S. entrepreneurs. In 1846, the first modern oil well in the world was drilled in the South Caucasus region of Russian Empire, on the Absheron Peninsula north-east of Baku (in settlement Bibi-Heybat).

Development of petroleum took place as Mexico's railway system was developed in the 1880s and 1890s, allowing petroleum to reach export markets; before that there was no internal market for Mexican petroleum and no way for petroleum to be easily exported. By 1901, commercial production of crude oil in Mexico had begun. California oil entrepreneur Edward L. Doheny opened the Ebano oil field along the Mexican Central Railway.

In 1889 the Veracruz legislature passed a law titled Ley sobre subdivision de la propiedad territorial, under which the state gave land titles to private owners. The privatization of land allowed state to declare any land that was not privatized to be public land.

In 1883, the Mexican Congress passed the Ley de Colonización, which allowed private land companies to survey public lands for the purpose of subdivision and settlement. For their work surveying this public land, the company would receive one-third the surveyed land, and gave them the opportunity to buy the remaining two-thirds at a very low cost. This allowed more than 132 million acres of Mexican land to be owned by the surveyors. By the early twentieth century the reapportionment was complete. The law divided former communal land and large estates into small, privately owned lots.

Dealing with private landowners made it easier for foreign oil companies to buy or lease oil property. Many property owners considered the up-front bonus they received for leasing their property to be “easy money.” A typical oil lease allowed the property owners remain on the land; if the company did not start producing oil from the land within the term of the lease, commonly five years, the company would leave, and the owner still had the lease bonus money.

In July 1908, British entrepreneur Weetman Pearson struck oil in San Diego de la Mar, a co-proprietorship, that had been divided up into 87 individual lots, due to the privatization of lands. In 1889, President Porfirio Díaz had contracted British Weetman Pearson, to engineer several major projects in Mexico, such as the drainage of Mexico City, the dredging of Veracruz harbor, and the building of the southern Vera Cruz Tehuantepec Isthmus railroad line. Mexican President Porfirio Díaz also encouraged Pearson to develop petroleum reserves, resulting in the highly successful Compañia Mexicana de Petróleo "El Águila", exploiting the Potrero del Llano reserves located near the central Gulf of Mexico coast town of Tuxpan. This further fueled a massive land rush by the foreign oil companies. The two main companies Edward Doheny's Huasteca Petroleum, and Weetman Pearson's El Aguila were able to secure a large sum of land rights through ownership, and leasing. By 1922 Huasteca petroleum owned or leased 1,223,780 acres, and El Aguila 1,890,286 acres of land respectively. Pearson subsequently sold his shares "El Aguila" to Royal Dutch Shell, although "El Aguila" continued to have a majority of British investors. Mexico became an oil exporting nation in 1911, with the first shipment leaving the Gulf Coast port of Tampico.

Article 27 of the constitution of 1917 granted the Mexican government the permanent and complete rights to all subsoil resources. This would cause conflicts between the Mexican government and foreign companies, and “lay basis for a twenty-one-year struggle” between Mexico and foreign oil companies. Foreign oil companies questioned if Article 27 would be applied retroactively, leading to expropriation of oil rights by the Mexican government. At the end of World War I, the United States was concerned with rapid exhaustion of domestic oil resources. United States imports of crude oil, nearly all of it from Mexico, rose rapidly from 30 million barrels in 1917, to more than 100 million barrels per year from 1920 to 1922, before declining. The demand for Mexican oil imports was increased by the United States conservation of oil movement. The United States saw Mexican oil as an opportunity and the US business interests were heavily backed by the United States government

In 1925, President Plutarco Elías Calles decreed that foreign oil companies must register their titles and limited their concessions to fifty years.

Starting in 1918 and extending into the 1920s, Mexico was second behind the United States in petroleum output and led the world in oil exports. Oil production and exports from 1921 to 1925 were at historic high levels. In 1921, production was, in barrels of 42 gallons each, 193 million, with exports of 172 million. Production and exports declined each year through 1925, when production was 116 million, with exports of 97 million. In 1926 production dropped below 100 million barrels, and in 1942, net exports dropped below 10 million barrels.

In the 1930s, as a consequence of worldwide economic depression, the lack of new oil discoveries, increased taxation, political instability, and Venezuela's emergence as a more attractive source of petroleum, output fell to just 20% of its 1921 level. Production began to recover with the 1932 discovery of the Poza Rica field near Veracruz, which would become Mexico's main source of petroleum for the next several decades.

=== 1938 expropriation ===
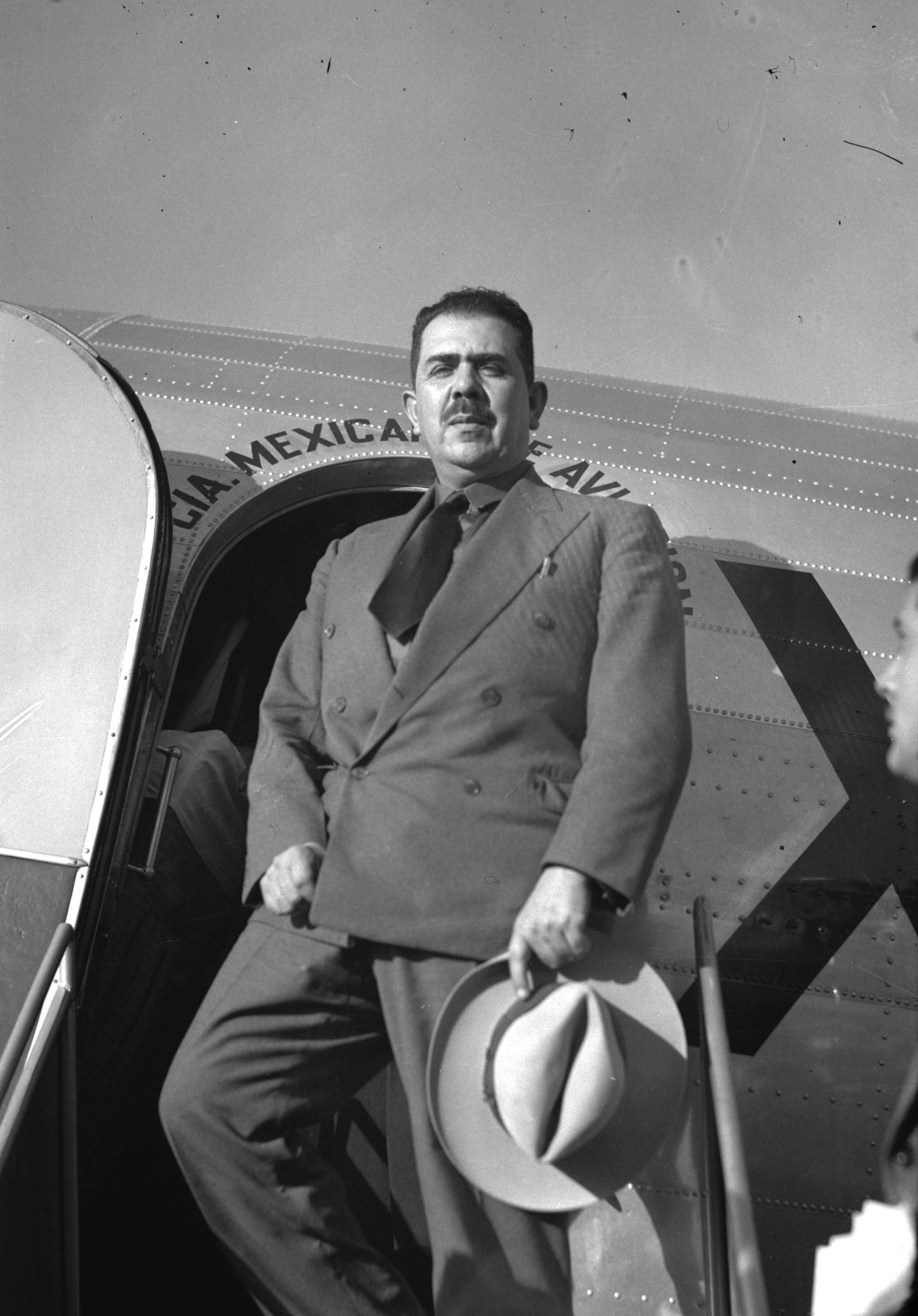
Lázaro Cárdenas del Río, president of Mexico from 1934 to 1940. In 1938, Cárdenas ordered the expropriation of all oil companies in Mexico.

PEMEX

The expropriation of lands by the Mexican government started with the ratification of the Mexican constitution of 1917. By nationalizing the land, Mexico and the people would be better able to control working conditions, pay, and environmental impact. However, this expropriation of land further marginalized the indigenous population.

In 1935, all companies in the business of oil production in Mexico were foreign companies. Labor practices in these companies poorly benefited the workers since the companies were able to block the creation of labor unions through legal and illegal tactics. Despite legal opposition, the Confederation of Mexican Workers was created and proposed a project of general contracts for each oil company. A strike was planned to push towards an agreement but the matter went to the court instead. On December 18, the Arbitration Board declared in favor of the union and ordered the oil companies had to pay 26 million pesos in lost wages because of the strike.

"Faced with political difficulties in Mexico, as well as the intrusion of saltwater into some of the major producing field, the United States and other foreign oil companies began to seek other sources of supply particularly in Venezuela, and interest in the middle east intensified as well." Foreign oil companies continued to pump as much oil as quickly as possible for exportation, until the Mexican expropriation in 1938, “Ignoring reasonable conservation measures to export as much oil as quickly as possible”. “Mexico only found itself compelled by the rebellious and defiant conduct of the oil companies that is decreed the expropriation of their properties.” The United States refusal to recognize and work with Mexico's post-revolution government, along with a very hazardous work environment that lead to workers strikes and revolts, forced the Mexican government to expropriate the land.

On March 18, 1938, Mexican President Lázaro Cárdenas announced the nationalization of all oil resources and facilities in Mexico. The government assumed control of all property of nearly every oil company operating in Mexico, including machinery, equipment, buildings, refineries, gas stations, ships and pipelines. At the time, the country's oil industry was dominated by Mexican Eagle Petroleum Company (a subsidiary of Royal Dutch Shell) and American oil firms such as Jersey Standard and Standard Oil of California.

On June 7, 1938, the state-owned company Petróleos Mexicanos (or "Pemex") was founded, with exclusive rights over exploration, extraction, refining, and commercialization of oil in Mexico.

=== International reaction to expropriation ===
The British government demanded immediate compensation for the Mexican Eagle Petroleum Company. However, the company had been founded as a Mexican company under Mexican law. Therefore, the British government couldn't intervene directly in the company's favor. Diplomatic relations between the countries were soon broken, but not before Mexico paid a debt claimed by the British government for damages caused during the Mexican Revolution.

The government of the Netherlands sent business manager Arthur Methöfer to defend the interests of their citizens. Methöfer refused to recognize the legality of the expropriation and demanded the immediate return of expropriated property or immediate payment as compensation. Mexican Secretary of Foreign Affairs Eduardo Hay reaffirmed that the Mexican government was willing and committed to pay compensation within the stipulated time period. As the Dutch government began to realize the Cárdenas government would not reverse the expropriation decree, the Anglo-Dutch company Royal Dutch Shell decided to pressure Mexico without the help of the government.

Negotiations with the United States went differently. During Cárdenas's speech, he claimed that the resources in the subsoil belonged to the Mexican nation, and therefore would not be considered as part of the compensation to foreign businesses. The companies, however, assumed compensation should include the fuel that was estimated to be found in the soil. President Franklin D. Roosevelt in a public speech recognized the right of Mexico to expropriate the oil properties and agreed to accept compensation for the properties of the companies excluding underground oil.

=== Boycott ===
In retaliation for the expropriation, Standard Oil of New Jersey and Royal Dutch Shell began a boycott against Mexico. The companies tried to prevent Mexico from acquiring chemicals necessary to the process of refining (such as tetraethyl lead), and specialized machinery. This plan was supported by several American companies which refused to sell certain products to Mexico such as drilling equipment, pumps, ethyl fluid, air compressors and electrical equipment.

Soon after, students at the Instituto Politécnico Nacional and the National Autonomous University of Mexico were able to synthesize tetraethyl lead, a popular gasoline additive at the time used for boosting octane ratings. Gradually, companies that sold parts and equipment gave in as Mexico opted to buy from Germany, Italy and other European countries.

The U.S. State Department assisted with the boycott in various ways. Purchases of Mexican silver were suspended, which represented an average amount of $30 million annually, although after 1938 sales were resumed in smaller quantities and lower prices. In the United States, government departments prohibited the use of Mexican fuel. Preference was given to the importation of Venezuelan oil. The import tax for Mexican oil increased from 15 to 50 cents on the dollar while Venezuelan oil was only taxed at 25 cents. Shipping agencies were pressured not to transport Mexican oil.

=== World War II ===
In 1938, Mexico had voted during the Pan-American Conference in favor of establishing continental solidarity against non-American and non-democratic influences, an allusion to the governments of Adolf Hitler, Benito Mussolini, and Hirohito. Nonetheless, owing primarily to the boycott, Mexico maintained economic and commercial relations with these countries. Gradually, commercial and diplomatic relations between Mexico and Germany and Italy deteriorated. After the Japanese attacked Pearl Harbor in 1941, Mexico cut diplomatic ties with Germany and Italy.

Cárdenas's hand picked successor, Manuel Ávila Camacho, was elected president of Mexico in 1940. With the outbreak of World War II, "the quarrel over oil effectively ended" between the U.S. and Mexico. Franklin Delano Roosevelt was more interested in forming a strategic alliance with Mexico to create an anti-fascist front than in protecting private companies and had already proclaimed the Good Neighbor Policy in 1933. The U.S. government required cooperation to guard its borders and coastlines and to secure the supply of raw materials, including oil. The Mexican government agreed to pay $40 million for claims originating from the Mexican Revolution, and the U.S. government opened a line of credit in order to stabilize the Mexican currency. The State Department also resumed purchases of silver from Mexico and investments were made in Mexico's transportation infrastructure.

=== Post-nationalization ===
Between 1938 and 1971, Mexico's oil output expanded at an average annual rate of 6%. In 1957, Mexico became a petroleum net importer after domestic demands exceeded domestic production. However, production rose to 177 million barrels (28.1×10^{6} m^{3}) by 1971 with the exploitation of new oil fields in the isthmus of Tehuantepec and natural gas reserves near the northeastern border city of Reynosa, but the gap between domestic demand and production continued to widen.

1973 witnessed Mexican oil production surpassing the peak of 190 million barrels (30×10^{6} m^{3}) achieved in the early 1920s. In 1974 Pemex announced petroleum discoveries in Veracruz, Baja California, Chiapas, and Tabasco. In 1976, President López Portillo announced that Mexico's proven hydrocarbon reserves had risen up to 11 billion barrels (1.7×10^{9} m^{3}). By 1983, that figure further rose to 72.5 billion barrels (11.53×10^{9} m^{3}). López Portillo increased Mexican petroleum production and used the value of the reserves as collateral for negotiating large international loans, most of which went to Pemex.

From 1977 to 1980, Pemex received $12.6 billion in international credit, representing 37% of Mexico's total foreign debt but nevertheless used the money to construct and operate offshore drilling platforms. Pemex further expanded by building onshore processing facilities, enlarging its refineries, and vastly improving its production capabilities. These investments led to an increase in petroleum output from 400 million barrels (64×10^{6} m^{3}) in 1977 to 1.1 billion barrels (170×10^{6} m^{3}) by 1982, the end of López Portillo's six-year term as president.

By 2007, Mexico had a net oil export of 1.756 million barrels per day (279.2×10^{3} m^{3}/d).

In early 2008 the price of oil hit record highs exceeding $100/barrel for the first time ever. By July the price had reached $147.27 and based on demand projections, outlooks were optimistic. At this time a group met at the Mexican finance ministry and reached an agreement to hedge Mexican oil revenues. They placed orders with Barclays, Goldman Sachs, Morgan Stanley and Deutsche Bank to buy put options at prices ranging from $66.50 to $87 barrel for a total of $1.5 billion or 330 million barrels. Shortly afterward the price of oil collapsed during the subprime mortgage crisis and by 2009 the average price of oil was less than $55. The $5.1 billion deal is sometimes called "the Agustínian hedge" after Agustín Carstens who was finance minister at the time.

In 2013, the administration of Enrique Peña Nieto implemented a policy of liberalization that officially opened Mexico's oil industry to investment by foreign companies. This policy was opposed by the majority of Mexicans, with a more popular solution being to lower the tax on Pemex. The reform was also opposed by the following president Andres Manuel López Obrador (AMLO), who governed from 2018 to 2023. In 2022, AMLO reduced the tax imposed on Pemex to 40%, and pledged to cover the company's debts. Current president Claudia Sheinbaum Pardo has indicated that she plans to continue the energy policies implemented under the AMLO administration, stating that the neoliberal period of 2007–2018 was "very damaging" to Pemex.

== Oil production ==
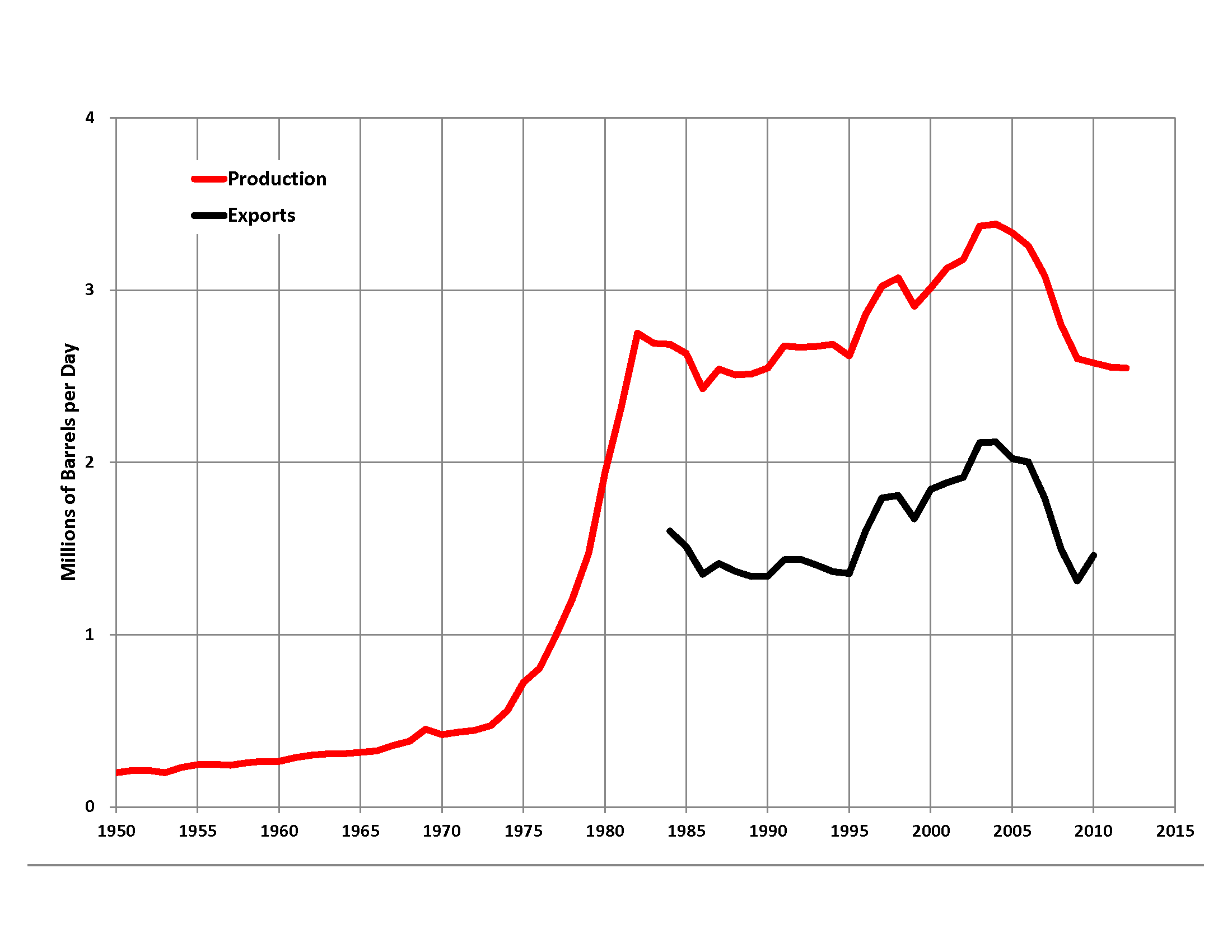
Oil production in Mexico, 1950– 2012 (red) and exports (black)

Mexico produces three grades of crude oil: heavy Maya-22 (accounting for more than half of the total production); light, low-sulfur Isthmus-34 (28% of production); and extra-light Olmeca-39 (20% of production). At the beginning of 2002 Mexico had the second largest proven oil reserves in the Western Hemisphere with 30.8 billion barrels (4.90×10^{9} m^{3}). However, according to Pemex, Mexico's reserves/production ratio fell from 20 years in 2002 to 10 years in 2006, and Mexico had only 12.4 billion barrels (1.97×10^{9} m^{3}) of proven oil reserves left by 2007. Mexico stands ninth in the worldwide ranking of conventional oil reserves with only Venezuela higher in the Western Hemisphere (although Canada ranks higher if proven reserves of unconventional oil in oil sands are included).

Pemex is Mexico's state-owned petroleum company and, for decades, was the sole supplier of all commercial gasoline (petrol/diesel) stations in the country. Cantarell Field is the largest oil field in Mexico and one of the largest in the world producing. As of Jan 2001, Mexico has approximately 10.42 billion barrels (1.657×10^{9} m^{3}) in proven oil reserves. In November 2006, Pemex reported that Cantarell has produced 11.492 billion barrels (1.8271×10^{9} m^{3}) of oil. Several oil fields have also been discovered in the Chicontepec Basin and neighboring Golden Lane. The Chicontepec fields contains Mexico's largest, certified hydrocarbon reserve, totaling more than 19,000,000,000 barrels of oil equivalent (1.2×10^{11} GJ) with original oil in place of over 139,000,000,000 barrels of oil equivalent (8.5×10^{11} GJ); recovery is complicated by challenging, low recovery rate reservoirs, but is made more attractive due to the presence of light and super-light oil.

The "South Zone" for Pemex includes the states of Chiapas, Tabasco, Campeche, Yucatán, Quintana Roo and the southern portions of Guerreo, Oaxaca and Veracruz with exploration beginning in 1863 with Father Manuel Gil y Sainz's San Fernando Mine near Tepetitan Town, Tabasco, Dr. Simon Sarlat's well in 1883, and commercial production from the Capoacan and San Cristobal oil fields in 1905 and 1906 respectively. Fields discovered with associated salt diapirs in the Saline Basin, near Coatzacoalcos, include Tonala-El Burro (1928), El Plan (1929), Cinco Presidentes (1946), Magallanes (1957) and Ogarrio (1957). Fields producing from the Chiapas-Tabasco Mesozoic area around Villahermosa include Sitio Grande (1972), Cactus, and Antonio J. Bermúdez (1958). Fields discovered with associated anticlines in the Macuspana Basin, between Villahermosa and Ciudad del Carmen, include Jose Colomo (1951), Chilapilla (1956) and Hormiguero.

In 2002, the Ku-Maloob-Zaap oil field was discovered offshore in the Bay of Campeche, 105 kilometers from Ciudad del Carmen. Pemex plans to drill 82 fields and install 17 oil platforms, as well as build an oil pipeline of 166 kilometers to transport the oil produced. By 2011, production is expected to reach 800 thousand barrels per day (130×10^{3} m^{3}/d) and 282 million cubic feet (8.0×10^{6} m^{3}) of natural gas.

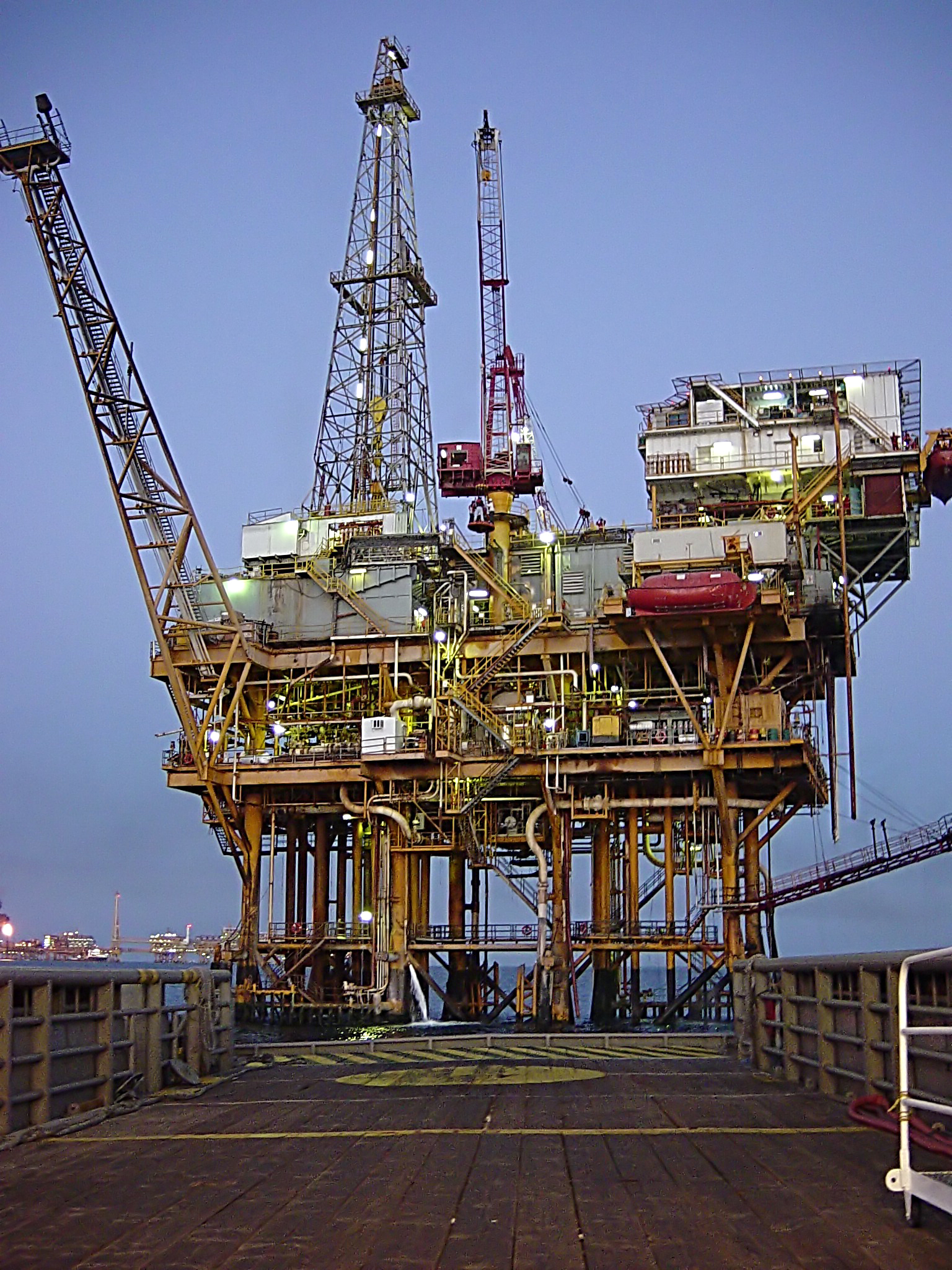
Offshore platform in the Gulf of Mexico

Annual production has dropped or failed to increase each year since 2004. Furthermore, it has been reported the 2005–2006 daily oil production was down by approximately 500 thousand barrels per day (79×10^{3} m^{3}/d) on the previous year. Nevertheless, Mexico still produced approximately 2.98 million barrels (474×10^{3} m^{3}) of oil per day (2010 est.) ranking it seventh in the world in terms of total production.

Year	Oil Production		Rank	Percentile Change
Year	million barrels per day	thousand cubic meters per day	Rank	Percentile Change
2003	3.59	571	5	N/A
2004	3.59	571	5	0.00%
2005	3.46	550	5	-3.62%
2006	3.42	544	6	-1.16%
2007	3.50	556		+2,3%
2009	3.00	477		
2010 (est)	2.98	474	7	-0,1%
2011 (est)	2.5	400		

== Environmental impacts ==
Beginning with the desire for gold and silver in the sixteenth century, both foreign and domestic powers have mined the landscape of Mexico for natural resources and precious goods with a primarily financial focus and not an environmental one. The original open pit mining for metals like iron had devastating impacts such as loss of mountain landscapes, toxic waste disposal, and the demolition of entire ecosystems. Native populations viewed this search for oil with disdain as it affected their agricultural way of life by removing cattle fields to make room for oil fields. With the onset of petroleum mining in the early twentieth century, environmental impacts escalated. While foreign powers were often successful in shaping the economic environment of the petroleum-containing countries they entered, they largely ignored the natural environment they would be affecting.

Although the most popular incident in the public's mind concerning oil accidents is the Deepwater Horizon Spill that occurred in the Gulf of Mexico in 2010, many incidents have occurred on the physical territory of Mexico. Rather than simply affecting marine life and bodies of water, petroleum and the materials used to harvest it can also have negative impacts on dry land. For example, hydraulic fracturing can damage water access for local populations and produce harmful chemicals that are leaked into the surrounding environment.

Since the initial surge of oil drilling in 1889, several accidents have occurred throughout mainland Mexico. In 1908, a fire at the Dos Bocas drilling site caused fear and panic among the residents of Tantima, the local village, as the explosion rocked the area. After burning for over a month and killing a small number of people, the Dos Bocas fire created a dangerous area that most residents avoided. Besides the rumors and superstitions that characterized the locals' discussion, the event had significant environmental impacts as well. Hydrogen sulphide gas had turned the previously vibrant area into a silent and dead expanse. The transition of the land from verdant to empty resulted in a negative opinion towards the petroleum industry in Veracruz. Other blowouts that followed the incident at Dos Bocas continued to damage the surrounding area's vegetation, wildlife, and general ecosystem. Often, these small-scale fires and spills are viewed as insignificant to the grander environment, which many believe can heal itself. However, the consequence of many small events, according to theorists, is a lasting impact that may not be curable.

Some researchers claim that the degrading infrastructure of many drilling sites in Mexico made areas unfit for habitation. The habitats in question include those used by animals, vegetation, and the human population of the area. The contamination of the ecosystem after drilling occurs often causes towns to lose residents or disappear entirely. Poza Rica, a typical oil town in Mexico, was the subject of a study that revealed the difficulties associated with living in an area dominated by petroleum drilling. The inhabitants of Poza Rica are constantly renegotiating their everyday lives to fit the changing landscape around them; this includes practicing large and small safety measures, ignoring toxic smells in the air, and recovering from the loss of jobs when oil fields are retired. Any area with drilling present became a town in which it was believed deadly accidents could occur. However, people often compromised to remain in their homes, ignoring or simply accepting the potentially dangerous side effects.

One way to analyze the presence of oil companies in places such as Veracruz is to see how the natives responded to outside forces that changed their way of life. The Huastecs, a native population in the area, fought to hold their traditional practice of agriculture when oil companies entered their homeland. The native population's land was often taken without respect for the centuries of native presence there, turning pastures and forests into oil camps. The natives viewed this change as an unhygienic and cruel transformation from forest to industry.

== Social impacts ==
The petroleum industry in Mexico has diverse impacts on Mexican society. Petroleum exploration and production activities are legally defined to be of social interest and public order, and are given priority over any other potential exploitation of surface or subsoil resources. During his presidency, AMLO described the industry as a potential "lever of development," While the industry is responsible for job creation and economic growth, this growth is dependent on the external fluctuations of the global oil market.

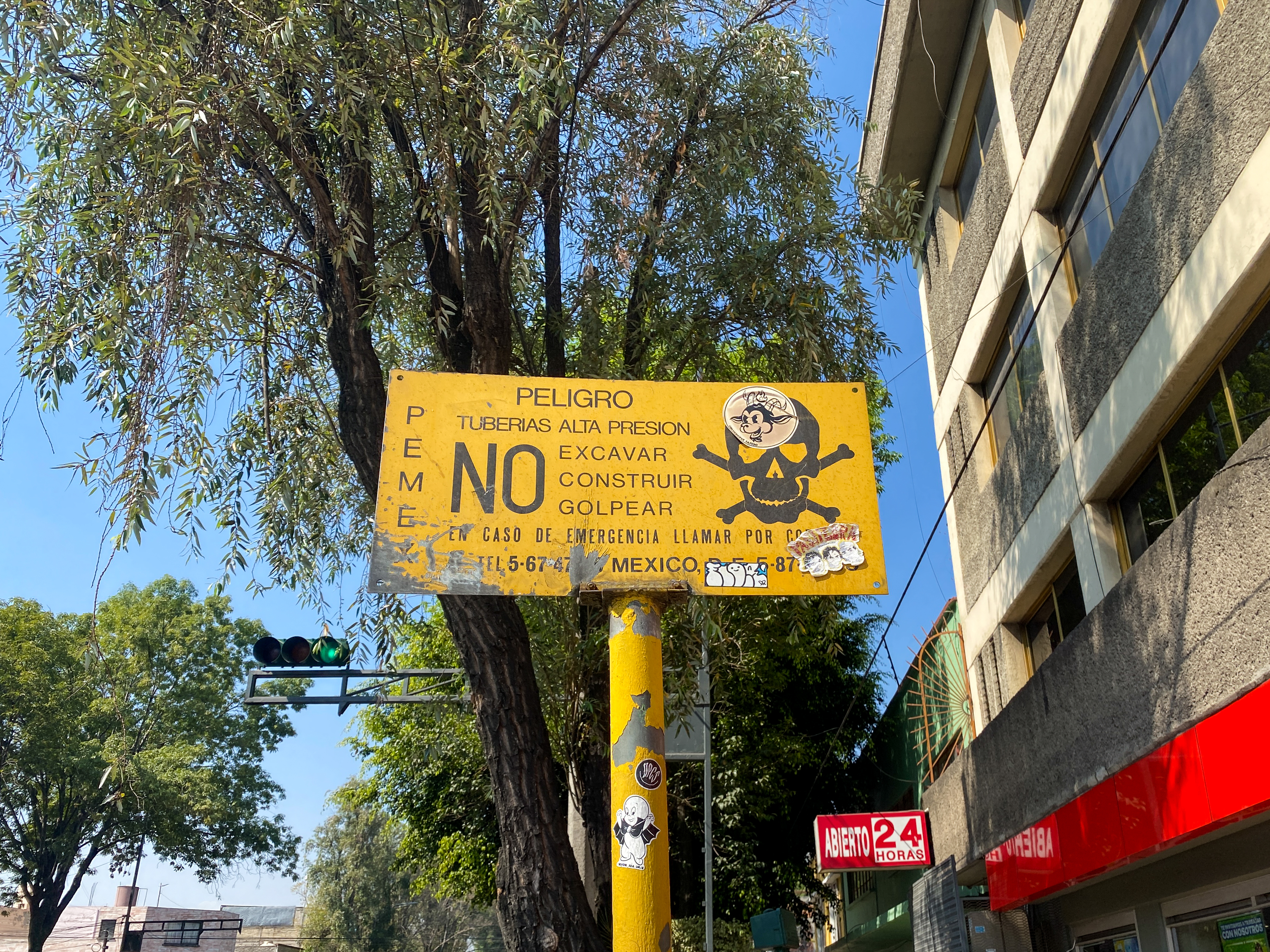
A warning sign for a Pemex pipeline to the former Azcapotzalco Refinery. Oil infrastructure such as pipelines can present risks of spills or explosions.

Additionally, residents of extraction zones have expressed negative perceptions of the impacts of oil extraction on their communities. In the Emiliano Zapata community in the state of Veracruz, these negative perceptions were particularly strong regarding the sociocultural and socioenvironmental impacts of extraction. Elder residents mentioned that the arrival of the petroleum industry to their community in 1954 marked the beginning of a decline in the use of the indigenous Totonac language and in the practice of traditional means of subsistence. However, residents still held certain positive perceptions towards the industry, particularly in its impact on economic development and on Pemex's handling of accidents. Other communities have expressed disdain towards Pemex's responses to spills and explosions. In the rural settlement of Lázaro Cardenas in Comalcalco, Tabasco, residents overwhelmingly reported having lived through at least one disaster or accident due to Pemex's extraction of oil in the region. In general, rural communities are more likely to be negatively affected by oil extraction.

The ability of the oil industry to contribute to public revenue and economic development is also hampered by industry corruption, which contributes problems such as fuel theft, known colloquially as huachicoleo. In the first three months of 2021, 22.1% of fuel consumed in Mexico was provided by the black market. These problems were worsened after the Energy Reform of 2013 under the administration of Enrique Peña Nieto. Fuel theft decreases trust in the industry, contributing to spills and accidents and increasing the difficulty of effective management of pipelines. In 2015, then director of Pemex, Emilio Lozoya Austin, stated that "the theft of hydrocarbons is one of the greatest problems that Pemex faces today."

== See also ==
- 2017 Mexican protests
- Chart of exports and production of oil by nation
- Economy of Mexico
- Energy in Mexico
- Electricity sector in Mexico
- List of oil-producing states
