= Central neurogenic hyperventilation =

Abnormal pattern of breathing

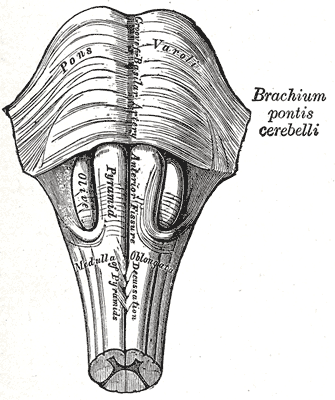
- Anteroinferior view of the medulla oblongata and pons. Invasive tumors present in either of these areas have been implicated as the main causes of CNH.
- Causes: Lesions in the brainstem, most often because of brain tumor

Central neurogenic hyperventilation (CNH) is an abnormal pattern of breathing characterized by deep and rapid breaths at a rate of at least 25 breaths per minute. Increasing irregularity of this respiratory rate generally is a sign that the patient will enter into coma. CNH is unrelated to other forms of hyperventilation, like Kussmaul's respirations. CNH is the human body's response to reduced carbon dioxide levels in the blood. This reduction in carbon dioxide is caused by contraction of cranial arteries from damage caused by lesions in the brain stem. However, the mechanism by which CNH arises as a result from these lesions is still very poorly understood. Current research has yet to provide an effective means of treatment for the rare number of patients who are diagnosed with this condition.

== Signs and symptoms ==
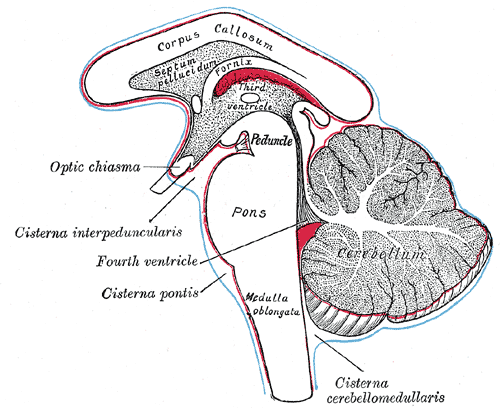
Three principle subarachnoid cisternae consisting of the pons, medulla oblongata, and the cerebellum. A cross-section diagram of the area of the brain typically affected by tumors in the condition CNH.

Symptoms of CNH have been observed to vary according to the progression of CNH. The initial symptoms of CNH include a low arterial partial pressure of carbon dioxide, a high or normal arterial partial pressure of oxygen, high arterial pH, and tachypnea. The partial pressure of carbon dioxide has been noted by Yushi et al. to drop as low as 6.7 mmHg, while oxygen saturation remains at 99-100%. Respiratory alkalosis is induced in people affected by CNH, which stimulates the hyperpnea to attempt to compensate the rise of the blood's pH. Some of the reported cases of CNH claim alkaline cerebral spinal fluid (CSF). However, not all of the cases experience this effect and other cases of CNH have a local increase in the pH surrounding the tumor that causes the condition. The hyperventilation of CNH patients persists during sleep. Those affected have been observed to not be able to voluntarily control their breathing in order to slow it down and the hyperventilation is predominantly controlled by the diaphragm.

CNH has been found to affect people of all ages, ranging from children at the age of seven to adults at the age of eighty-seven. It has affected people while they have been both conscious and unconscious. After Plum and Swanson's initial discovery of CNH it was thought that CNH was rare in conscious patients. More cases of CNH have been observed in conscious patients since then. Additional symptoms of conscious CNH include loss of appetite, difficulty concentrating, poor memory, difficulties in eating or talking, cachexia, vomiting, disorientation, and a generalized confused state that varies from patient to patient. It is generally seen, however, that the mood changes, anxiety, and difficulty concentrating progress as the tumor increases in severity and, in effect, CNH persists. All of these symptoms are not present in each reported case of CNH, and symptoms seem to vary on a case to case basis. Other symptoms that have been associated with CNH are transient epileptic episodes with a temporary loss of consciousness. This condition is thought to result from severe hypocapnia that induces blood vessels in the brain to constrict, leading to brain ischemia. Other symptoms caused by CNH are electrolyte dysequilibrium and mood changes that primarily include anxiety due to the hyperventilation.

Once CNH is diagnosed, the condition generally progresses until the patient becomes unconscious or lapses into a coma. Most patients are seen to enter this state two to three months after the onset of CNH. Lange et al. cited a patient that experienced pulmonary edema, bronchitis, and pneumonia prior to death, though all reported cases of CNH describe various progressions of the condition until it worsens to the point of death.

=== Associations with body systems ===
CNH is most commonly associated with the central nervous system, and the majority of CNH cases have been associated with infiltrative tumors in the pons. Some cases involve the medulla and other regions of the brain. Primarily, researchers believe that the tumors infiltrate the pontine respiratory centers and central chemoreceptors. CNH has not been found to be associated with any other of the body's systems. Cardiac, pulmonary, and metabolic disorders have been ruled out as causes of the hyperventilation. Tests such as electrocardiograms, echocardiograms, torso computed tomographic scans, and chest radiographs have revealed that the pulmonary and cardiac systems of CNH are normal. Liver and kidney functions are also normal. Lymph node and thyroid enlargement also have not been detected. Association with the cardiovascular system is seen when the brain tumors reach the medullary cardiovascular centers, at which point the patient usually succumbs to death.

== Causes ==
Determining the exact cause of CNH has proven to be difficult, specifically because only 21 additional cases have been reported since Plum and Swanson's initial report of the condition in 1959. These subsequent reports deal only with conscious patients presenting with CNH, though the varied pathophysiologies present in each individual patient makes it nearly impossible to implicate either a particular structural lesion or the destruction of a specific locus as the sole cause of CNH. Compilations of the reports, however, have led to generalized conclusions about the primary role of structural lesions in the initiation of both juvenile and adult cases of CNH.

=== Tumor-induced CNH in adults ===
The majority of adult patients experiencing CNH have clinical histories of infiltrative, expanding tumors of the cortex, primarily involving the brainstem. Over three-quarters of the cases reported since the discovery of CNH by Plum and Swanson had tumors clearly involving the pons, with specific consideration given to pathology of the pontine tegmentum. CNH was also reported in patients with tumors affecting the medulla oblongata.

Though a diagnosis of CNH is rarely considered without evidence of brainstem infiltration, there have been other reported cases of CNH not directly involving the pons or medulla. CNH was also reported in cases involving a frontal lobe tumor, an invasive laryngeal carcinoma compressing the midbrain, an extension of tumors of the head and neck into the base of the brain, and thalamic hemorrhage. The manifestation of CNH in patients with these non-brainstem related disorders leads to greater debate about the pathophysiology of CNH and the role of other parts of the brain in the regulation of respiration. At this time, there have been no reported cases of CNH associated with stroke.

In each case, the nature of the tumor varied, though the two main categories of tumor were classified as either cerebral lymphomas or solid tumors, such as pontine gliomas, anaplastic medulloblastoma, or astrocytomas.

Particular attention is given to the high incidence of cerebral lymphomas associated with adult CNH. Intracerebral B-cell lymphoma represents less than 1% of all primary malignant tumors of the central nervous system. Infiltration of lymphoma cells into the pons and medulla is the most frequently reported cause of CNH, accounting for half of all CNH-inducing brain tumors, despite its considerable rarity. It has been suggested that these lymphomas are capable of diffusely penetrating the midbrain, without significantly destructing the overall structures.

=== Tumor-induced CNH in children ===
CNH in children is considerably less common, and only five of the twenty one cases have been documented in children aged 11 and younger. The primary difference between juvenile and adult cases of CNH is the structural identity of the tumors leading to CNH symptoms. Four of the five cases of CNH involving children were associated with solid infiltrative gliomas on the brainstem, while only one case was associated with an apparent lymphoma referred to as microgliomatosis.

=== Non-tumor induced CNH ===
There have been only a few reported cases of non-tumor induced CNH, most of which have been successfully treated. Recently, the anticonvulsant drug topiramate induced temporary CNH in patients, which abated after drug use was terminated. Additionally, there has been one reported case of CNH in a patient who has multiple sclerosis with brainstem lesions. The CNH was considered reversible and was successfully treated with high-dose intravenous methylprednisolone and plasma exchange.

== Pathophysiology ==
Although CNH is typically characterized by the presence of lesions in the brainstem region, the mechanism by which these lesions create uninhibited stimulation of the expiratory and inhalatory centers is still poorly understood. These lesions typically arise after cancerous cells from another location of the body metastasize and move to the brain. The mechanism by which CNH was originally thought to occur involved the separation of the pontine and medullary respiratory centers by infiltrative tumors. Animal models mimicking this separation, however, do not exhibit CNH. A secondary postulated mechanism by which CNH may function is that the lesions produce lactate which consequently serves as a stimulator for the chemoreceptors of the medullary region of the brainstem. Previous studies of CNH patients have verified the presence of lactic acid in cerebral spinal fluid.

== Diagnosis ==
For the clinical diagnosis of CNH, it is essential that the symptoms, particularly respiratory alkalosis, persist while the patient is both awake and asleep. The presence of hyperventilation during sleep excludes any possible emotional or psychogenic causes for the sustained hyperventilation. There must also be no evidence of drug or metabolic causes, including cardiac or pulmonary disease, or recent or current use of respiration-stimulating drugs. While a positive diagnosis of CNH in adult cases should be reserved only until all other possible causes of tachypnea have been eliminated, CNH should be suspected in any alert child presenting with unexplained hyperventilation and hypocarbia leading to respiratory alkalosis. Once CNH is determined to be a possible cause of hyperventilation, lesions and their location in the brain are verified using magnetic resonance imaging (MRI).

CNH lesions are confirmed through the use of magnetic resonance imaging(MRI) technology.

== Treatment ==
There is no accepted current course of treatment for CNH. Patients are usually supported by mechanical ventilation and managed with paralytic agents to control breathing rate until a more specific treatment plan can be developed. Morphine is used as the most common treatment, specifically for its ability to depress respiratory rate by reducing tidal volume to added carbon dioxide. However, morphine has only been found to be effective in reducing CNH in select cases. Successful documentation of CNH treatment typically involves the surgical removal of the lesions, or the use of brain irradiation or chemotherapy with corticosteroids to reduce the size of lesions in the affected area of the brain. In cases where CNH presents in children, whose conditions are typically characterized by more solid tumors, aggressive surgical and chemotherapeutic methods are highly recommended.

If treatment of the lesions is ineffective, studies have shown that intravenous fentanyl, a slow-acting narcotic, or a fentanyl patch can be used to slow respiration. In patch form, fentanyl is a good alternative to morphine therapy for its high lipid solubility and ability to be worn on the body. Narcotic treatment is largely temporary and high morbidity rates in adults and children are typically cited where lesions are not effectively treated or removed.

== Prognosis ==
The onset of CNH in all patients regardless of age can be a precursor to ensuing deterioration in patients with infiltrative tumors of the brainstem and medulla. These patients experience prolonged series of CNH before succumbing to the associated deterioration of medullary cardiovascular center, which ultimately results in death. In addition to clinical consequences of a positive CNH diagnosis, sustained hyperventilation also has a marked effect on daily life activities, and may significantly impede a patient's ability to eat or talk. The persistent hypocarbia, alkalotic pH, and resultant electrolyte disequilibrium may also alter a patient's mood or mental state. Patients presenting with CNH are often described as inattentive and anxious.

== History ==
Central neurogenic hyperventilation (CNH) is an extremely rare neurological disorder that was initially reported by Fred Plum, MD and August G. Swanson, MD, in 1959. Plum and Swanson described the symptoms of nine comatose patients, defining CNH as a syndrome consisting primarily of elevated arterial oxygen tension, decreased arterial carbon dioxide tension, and progressive tachypnea.

Postmortem examination of the nine patients' brains reported by Plum and Swanson, revealed necrosis of the central pons in five of the nine patients, and indirect compression of the pons in one additional patient. Their initial findings suggested that lesions in the medial pontine tegmentum leads to a disruption of cortical inhibitory effects of medullar respiratory center. Plum and Swanson suggested that failure to inhibit the activity of this particular region of the brain results in continuous stimulation of the respiratory center by the lateral pontile reticular formulation and laterally located descending neural pathway. The destruction of this required negative feedback mechanism causes the uncontrollable hyperventilation associated with CNH.

=== Additional findings ===
Subsequent findings revealed CNH can also occur in conscious patients. Patients with tumor-induced CNH remain conscious because the reticular activating system of the brain is not affected by the tumor in the early stages of the condition. The condition is considered extremely uncommon, and only 21 additional cases of tumor-inducing CNH were reported up until 2005. Only five of these cases were reported in children. The causes associated with conscious CNH are more varied than originally predicted by Plum and Swanson's study of comatose patients, although the most commonly reported causes of CNH involve infiltrative gliomas and lymphomas of the brainstem and pons.

Although the majority of CNH-inducing tumors are located in close proximity to other medullary homeostatic centers, the physiological changes associated with CNH are restricted to alterations in the control of breathing. Most patients present with normal readings for heart rate and blood pressure, even in the case of severe alkalosis caused by CNH, which indicates that the respiratory center affected by CNH is more sensitive to compression than other areas of the brain.

== Research ==
Current mechanisms by which CNH functions still remain poorly developed. In addition, a standard form of treatment has not been established to treat CNH. These characteristics make CNH an important condition that still needs to be investigated in adults and children, though the extreme rarity of the condition makes it difficult for research to successfully examine clinical cases.
