= Talos Energy =

American oil and gas company

- Type: Public
- Traded as: NYSE: TALO; S&P 600 component Russell 2000 component
- Industry: Oil
- Founded: 2012
- Headquarters: Houston, Texas
- Key people: Timothy S. Duncan (CEO and President); Shane Young (CFO and Senior Vice President; Stephen E. Heitzman (COO and Executive Vice President); John A. Parker (Executive Vice President – Exploration)
- Website: www.talosenergy.com

Talos Energy Inc. is an oil and gas company that engages in the exploration, development, and production of oil and natural gas properties in the Gulf Coast and Gulf of Mexico.

== History ==
The company was founded in 2012 by Timothy Duncan with a $600-million equity raise from Apollo Global Management and Riverstone Holdings. The company is based in Houston, Texas.

In July 2017, Talos Energy, Premier Oil, and Sierra Oil & Gas announced that exploratory drilling in the Zama-1 field, located in the shallow waters of the Gulf of Mexico, had uncovered a formation with between 1.4 billion and two billion barrels of light crude oil. Because not all oil present is such a formation is technically recovered, it is believed that the formation could yield about 425 million barrels.

In May 2018 Talos Energy Inc.("Talos") completed merger with Stone Energy Corporation (NYSE: SGY) ("Stone") and became Talos Energy, Inc. The new company trading on the New York Stock Exchange under the new ticker symbol "TALO".

In December 2018 Talos Energy started Zama discovery appraisal program, which will consist of three reservoir penetrations. The Zama-2 appraisal well is the first appraisal penetrations drilled to better define the resource potential of the Zama discovery. It was drilled in a down-dip location approximately 1.3 miles (2.1 kilometers) to the north of the Zama-1 discovery well to confirm the geological model and define the oil-water contact.

In June 2020, Talos Energy announced the bolt-on acquisition of assets from affiliates of Castex Energy 2005.

In September 2021, following Hurricane Ida, aerial images by the National Oceanic and Atmospheric Administration revealed a miles-long oil slick spreading in coastal waters approximately a mile off Port Fourchon. A spokesperson for the Coast Guard reported that the spill appeared to be in Bay Marchand, Block 4, possibly associated with a pipeline or a site owned or controlled by Talos Energy. Talos denies responsibility, but has employed several ships that are currently engaged in clean-up operations.

In February 2023, it was announced Talos Energy had acquired the Houston-headquartered oil and gas company, EnVen Energy Corporation for $1.1 billion.

== Operations ==
Talos currently operates in two jurisdictions, the U.S. Gulf of Mexico and shallow water offshore Mexico. Its operations in the U.S. Gulf of Mexico are primarily focused in deepwater, with key operational areas in the Green Canyon and Mississippi Canyon areas. Talos also maintains operations on the U.S. Gulf of Mexico Shelf. In Mexico, Talos is active in Blocks 7, 2, and 31, with Block 7 containing its globally recognized Zama discovery.

== Zama's dispute ==
Mexican state-owned oil company PEMEX claims rights over the Zama discovery, as the company has drilling rights in an adjacent oil field. The Mexican company argues that the Zama deposit extends into its territory, but the firm must prove it by drilling. A third-party reservoir engineering firm concluded Talos held 49.6% of the discovery, while the remaining 50.4% was found to be in Pemex-operated areas. However, Talos CEO Tim Duncan considered that the analysis underestimated relevant data. Talos claims 59.6% of Zama.
