= Alberta Basin =

Alberta Basin is a sedimentary basin located on the eastern side of the Rocky Mountains in western Canada. It extends from British Columbia through Alberta and Saskatchewan into Manitoba.

== Formation ==
The basin was formed when the Earth's crust sank along the continental side of the Rocky Mountains during the Devonian Period (about 415 to 360 million years ago). From that time until the Late Cretaceous Period (about 100 to 65 million years ago), the region was covered by the sea at various intervals. Marine sediments gradually accumulated in the deepest parts of the basin, and large reefs composed of marine fossils and algae formed along its margins. Uplift the region beginning about 65 million years ago halted sedimentation and exposed the basin deposits to erosional forces. The organic matter buried under layers of sediment and subjected to intense heat and pressure developed into oil and natural gas, which collected in the surround porous rock (e.g., limestone reef remnants). Although oil and natural gas are the best known of these mineral resources, they also include coal, potash, and salt. Structural traps produced by the folding and faulting of rocks in the basin during the formation of the Rocky Mountains helped promote petroleum accumulation.
