= National Hydrocarbons Commission =

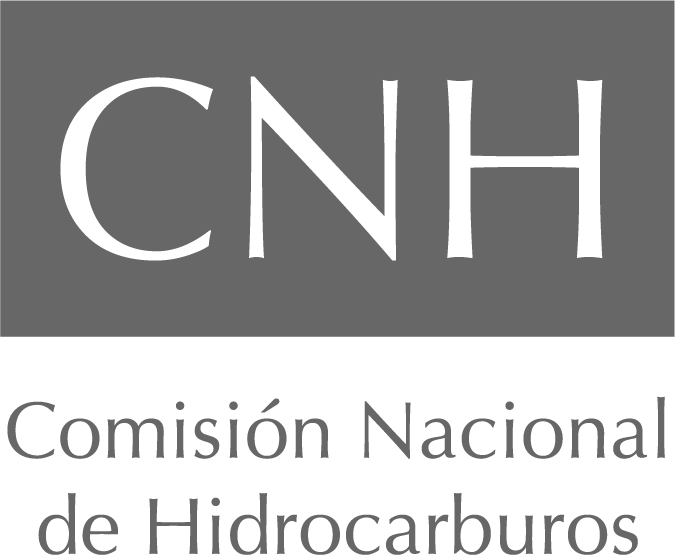

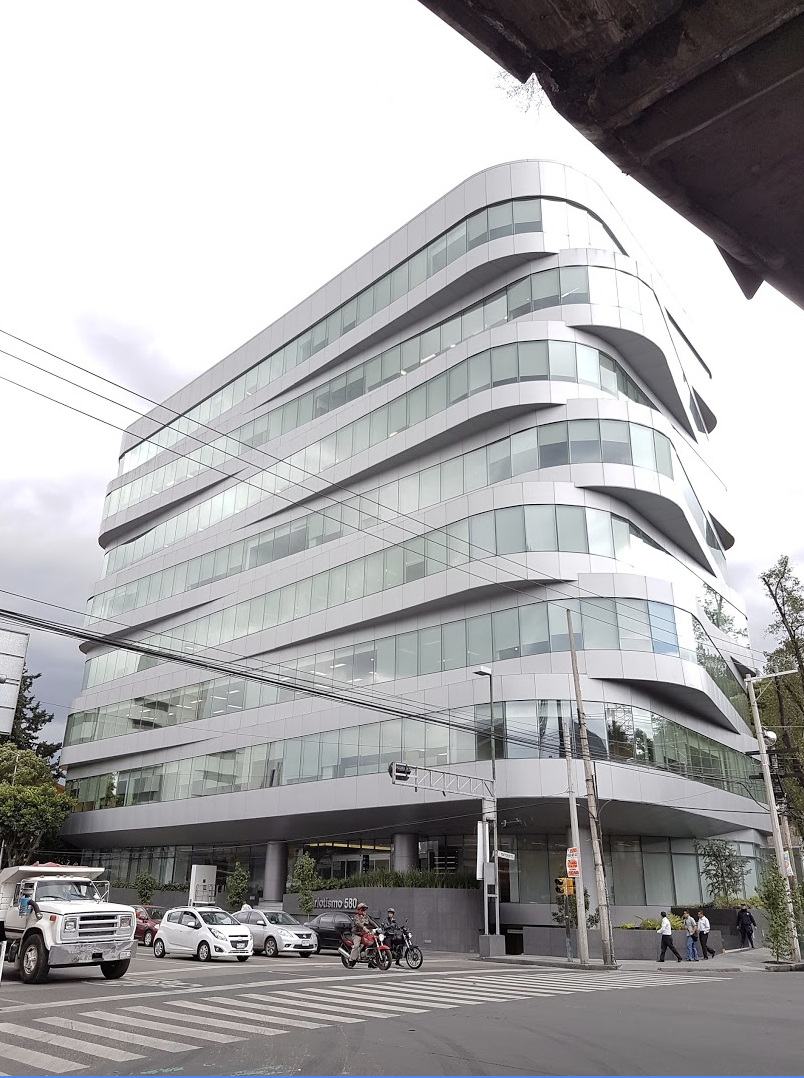
- Headquarters at Mexico City

Agency overview
- Headquarters: Mexico City
- Website: gob.mx/cnh

The National Hydrocarbons Commission (Spanish: Comision Nacional de Hidrocarburos) (CNH) was an agency of the Mexican Federal government.

CNH was responsible for gathering and maintaining information on oil and gas exploration, operating research projects on hydrocarbons, and regulating the prospecting and exploration of hydrocarbons.

CNH were run by the Board of Commissioners, composed of seven members. The President of Mexico nominates three candidates and the Senate of the Republic designates one.

== History ==
On April 8, 2008, the Executive government presented a series of reforms to Article 27 of the Constitution of Mexico and to secondary laws regulation the oil sector in Mexico.

One proposal was the creation of CNH to insure "that the exploration and extraction are carried maximizing oil rents in the extraction of crude oil and natural gas." The amendment was approved in October 2008,

CNH was formally installed on May 20, 2009, when Felipe Calderon appointed the five members of the commissioners. This first Board of Commissioners were Juan Carlos Zepeda Molina, Edgar Rene Rangel Germán, Javier Humberto Estrada Estrada, Guillermo Cruz Dominguez Vargas and Eduardo Alfredo Guzman. The first was appointed as commissioner in May presidente.

The Reform Proposals of the government of Enrique Peña Nieto on energy carried out under the so-called Pact for Mexico, whose goals include reforming the functions of the CNH to give greater strength and give authority to sign contracts and tenders in energy. Also given powers of supervision and promotion of hydrocarbon activities . In early April 2014 the drafting of the amendments to articles 25, 27 and 28 of the Constitution and the Law on the National Commission of Hydrocarbons you were finished and were waiting to be approved by both Cámaras.

On April 29, 2014, Juan Carlos Zepeda Molina was reelected as president of the commission for a period of 5 years.

== Organization ==
The current composition of Board of Commissioners is:

- Juan Carlos Zepeda Molina, President Commissioner
- Alma América Porres Luna, Commissioner
- Néstor Martínez Romero, Commissioner
- Héctor Alberto Acosta Félix, Commissioner
- Sergio Pimentel Vargas, Commissioner
- Héctor Moreira Rodríguez, Commissioner
- Gaspar Franco Hernández, Commissioner

== Regulatory highlights ==
- Technical Provisions to Avoid or Reduce Flaring and Venting of Gas in the Exploration and Exploitation of Hydrocarbons
- Technical Guidelines for Designing Hydrocarbon Exploration and Exploitation Projects and their Evaluation
- Guidelines Regulating the Ruling Process for the Approval of Evaluation and Quantification Reports of Hydrocarbon Reserves Developed by Petróleos Mexicanos and the Approval of the Final Reports of the Certifications Completed by Independent Third Parties
- First Technical Paper of Oil and Gas Recovery Factors
- First Review of the Tertiary Gulf Oil Project
