= Depletion =

Depletion may refer to:

== Environment ==
- Resource depletion, decline of resources
- Gas depletion, decline of oil supply
- Nutrient depletion, loss of nutrients in a habitat
- Oil depletion, decline of oil supply
- Overdrafting, extracting groundwater beyond the equilibrium yield of an aquifer
- Ozone depletion, a decline in the total amount of ozone in Earth's atmosphere

== Physics ==
- Depletion force, an effective force in molecular and colloidal systems
- Depletion region, in semiconductor physics
- Grain boundary depletion, a mechanism of corrosion

== Other uses ==
- Depleted uranium
- Ego depletion, idea that self-control or willpower draws upon a limited pool of mental resources that can be used up
- Depletion (accounting), an accounting and tax concept used in mining, timber, petroleum, or other similar industries
- T-cell depletion, process of T cell removal or reduction
