= Elsa oil field =

Oil field located in the Adriatic Sea

Coordinates: 42°23′N 14°26′E

Elsa
- Country: Italy
- Region: Adriatic Sea
- Offshore/onshore: offshore
- Operator: Orca Exploration

Field history
- Discovery: 1992
- Start of production: 1992

Production
- Current production of oil: 10,000 barrels per day (~5.0×10^{5} t/a)
- Estimated oil in place: 55 million tonnes (~ 65×10^{6} m^{3} or 410 million bbl)

The Elsa oil field is an oil field located in the Adriatic Sea. It was discovered in 1992 and developed by Orca Exploration. It began production in 1992 and produces oil. The total proven reserves of the Elsa oil field are around 410 million barrels (55 million tonnes), and production is centered on 10,000 barrels per day (1,600 m^{3}/d).
