= Midia South East oil field =

Oilfield in Romania

Midia South East
- Country: Romania
- Region: Black Sea
- Offshore/onshore: offshore

Field history
- Discovery: 2001
- Start of production: 2020

Production
- Estimated oil in place: 105 million tonnes (~ 120×10^{6} m^{3} or 750 million bbl)
- Estimated gas in place: 10.3×10^{9} m^{3} 362×10^{9} cu ft

The Midia South East field is a Romanian oil field that was discovered in 2001 and located on the continental shelf of the Black Sea. It will begin production in 2020 and will produce oil and natural gas. The total proven reserves of the Midia South East oil field are around 750 million barrels (119,000,000 m^{3}), and production will be centered on 50,000 barrels per day (7,900 m^{3}/d) in 2020.
