= OWC =

OWC can refer to:

- Office Web Components, a type of programmable control in Microsoft Office
- Oil-water contact, the interface between layers of oil and water in hydrocarbon reservoirs
- Open-wheel car, a car with its wheels outside of its main body
- Open Windrow Composting, composting of waste in open-air windrows
- Optical wireless communications
- Oscillating water column, a wave power technology
- Overwatch Contenders, a professional esports league
