= Mukul Sharma (professor) =

Mukul M. Sharma is a professor who holds the W. A. "Tex" Moncrief, Jr. Centennial Chair in the Hildebrand Department of Petroleum and Geosystems Engineering at the University of Texas at Austin. He received a B. Tech. degree from the Indian Institute of Technology Kanpur (1980) and then M.Sc. and Ph.D. degrees from the University of Southern California in 1981 and 1985 respectively. He has been on the faculty at the University of Texas for the past 39 years and served as chairman of the department from 2001 to 2005.

His research interests include hydraulic fracturing, oilfield water management, formation damage, and improved oil recovery. He has published over 450 journal articles and conference proceedings and has 21 patents.

In 2018, Sharma was elected a member of the US National Academy of Engineering for contributions to the science and technology of production from unconventional hydrocarbon reservoirs. He is the recipient of the 2002 Lester C. Uren Award, 2017 John Franklin Carll Award and the 2009 Lucas Gold Medal, SPE's highest technical awards. He is a distinguished alumnus of IIT Kanpur and USC and has also received the 2004 SPE Faculty Distinguished Achievement Award and the 1998 SPE Formation Evaluation Award. He served as an SPE Distinguished Lecturer in 2002, has served on the Editorial Boards of many journals, and taught and consulted for industry worldwide.

Beyond academia, Sharma has founded Austin Geotech Services, an E&P consulting company in 1996. He also co-founded Layline Petroleum in 2006, Navidad Energy in 2017, Geothermix in 2020, and Polaris Lithium in 2021.

== Awards ==
- Honorary Member of the Society of Petroleum Engineers, 2019
- US National Academy of Engineering, 2018
- SPE John, Franklin Carl Award, 2017
- SPE Anthony F. Lucas Gold Medal, 2009
- Lester C. Uren Award, SPE, 2003
- SPE Formation Evaluation Award, 1998
- SPE Faculty Distinguished Achievement Award, 2004
- SPE Distinguished Member, 2004
- SPE Distinguished Lecturer, 2004
- Billy and Claude Hocott Distinguished Engineering Research Award, 2010
- Editorial Review Board, SPE Journal, 1996-2000
- Technical Editor, Society of Petroleum Engineers, 1992–95
- Martin Marietta Excellence in Teaching Award, 1996
- Halliburton Foundation, Faculty Excellence Award, 1994
