= Luna gas field =

Italian gas field in the Mediterranean Sea

Luna
- Country: Italy
- Region: Ionian Sea
- Offshore/onshore: offshore
- Operator: Eni

Field history
- Discovery: 1971
- Start of development: 1971
- Start of production: 1975

Production
- Current production of gas: 4×10^{6} m^{3}/d 142×10^{6} cu ft/d 1.42×10^{9} m^{3}/a (50×10^{9} cu ft/a)
- Estimated gas in place: 37×10^{9} m^{3} 1.3×10^{12} cu ft

The Luna gas field is a natural gas field on the continental shelf of the Ionian Sea.

== Overview ==
It was discovered in 1971 and developed by Eni. It began production in 1975 and produces natural gas and condensates. The total proven reserves of the Luna gas field are around 1.3 trillion cubic feet (37 billion m^{3}), and production is slated to be around 142 million cubic feet/day (4 million m^{3}) in 2010. Eni produce gas from the field.
