= The Queen's Award for Enterprise: International Trade (Export) (2001) =

The Queen's Award for Enterprise: International Trade (Export) (2001) was awarded on 20 April.

== Recipients ==
The following organisations were awarded this year.

- AVX Limited MLC Division of County Londonderry, for Northern Ireland Multi-layer ceramic capacitors.
- Abercrombie & Kent Europe Ltd of Burford, Oxfordshire for De-luxe travel services.
- Adder Technology Ltd of Bar Hill, Cambridge for Computer peripheral equipment.
- Aircom International of Redhill, Surrey for ENTERPRISE integrated software solution, consultancy and product support.
- Aircontrol Technologies Ltd of Staines, Middlesex for Environmental life support systems.
- AorTech Europe Limited of Bellshill, Lanarkshire, Scotland for Replacement heart valves.
- Asset Security Managers Limited of London E1 for Specialist broking/advice on kidnap and ransom, product extortion and wrongful detention insurance.
- The Association of Chartered Certified Accountants of London WC2 for Professional examinations and membership.
- Julius Baer Investments Ltd of London EC3 for Investment advice.
- Bibby Line Limited of Liverpool for Offshore and marine vessel operations.
- Nigel Burgess Ltd of London SW1 for Luxury yacht brokerage, charter and management.
- Celador of London WC2 for Television programmes.
- Chemence Ltd of Corby, Northamptonshire for Engineering adhesives and sealants for industrial, consumer and medical markets.
- C. & J. Clark Limited of Street, Somerset for Footwear.
- Colefax & Fowler Limited of London W1 for Soft furnishings.
- Cooke Optics Limited of Thurmaston, Leicester for A range of prime 35mm lenses.
- Coombe Castle International Limited of Corsham, Wiltshire for Cheese and dairy products.
- G. Costa & Co Ltd of Aylesford, Kent for Pan-oriental foods, including Chinese, Thai and Japanese ingredients, authentic sauces, dips, noodles and rice.
- Delaware International Advisers Limited of London EC2 for Investment management.
- Digital Vision Limited of London SE1 for Production and distribution of royalty free digital photography and film footage.
- Domino Printing Sciences plc of Bar Hill, Cambridge for Ink jet and laser coding and marking equipment.
- Fibercore Limited of Southampton, Hampshire for Optical fibres.
- Gaffney, Cline & Associates of Alton, Hampshire for Consultancy services to the energy industry.
- Glassbond (N.W.) Ltd of St Helens, Merseyside for Specialist cements and moulding powders.
- Glotel Plc of London W1 for Telecommunications and networking consultancy.
- Group 4 Technology Limited of Tewkesbury, Gloucestershire for Access control equipment.
- Henrion, Ludlow & Schmidt Ltd of London SW1 for Corporate identity consultancy services.
- ISG Thermal Systems Limited of Basildon, Essex for Thermal imaging cameras.
- The Independent Fragrance Company of Northampton for Specialised fragrances.
- Ivory & Ledoux Limited of London SW1 for Fruit juice concentrates and purees, frozen and canned fruits, vegetables and fish.
- J & H Sales (International) Ltd of London E11 for Waste paper (secondary fibres) for recycling.
- Junior Hagen Ltd of London NW10 for Exclusive fashion trimmings and accessories.
- KW International t/a KWI of London SW6 for Computer software offering a completely integrated trading, risk management and settlement platform for energy markets.
- Labtech Limited of Presteigne, Powys, Wales for Microwave printed circuits.
- Land Rover of Solihull, West Midlands for Four wheel drive vehicles.
- Less Common Metals Limited of Birkenhead, Merseyside for Reactive metal alloys.
- Eli Lilly and Company Limited of Basingstoke, Hampshire for Pharmaceuticals and animal health products.
- London Business School of London NW1 for Business education and post graduate business degree programmes.
- M.O.S. (Miko Oilfield Supplies Ltd) of Shipley, West Yorkshire for Oilfield cranes and lifting appliances.
- Malmic Lace Ltd of Ruddington, Nottingham for Lace, trimmings, elastic and rigid braids.
- Martin-Baker Aircraft Company Limited of Uxbridge, Middlesex for Aircraft ejection seats.
- Mechatherm International Limited of Kingswinford, West Midlands for Industrial furnaces and ovens.
- Media Audits Ltd of London W1 for Media consultancy and evaluation services.
- Milton Keynes Pressings Ltd of Bletchley, Milton Keynes for Metal pressings and welded assemblies.
- JPMorgan Investor Services EMEA of London EC2 for Investor services.
- NGF Europe Limited of St Helens, Merseyside for Rubber impregnated glass fibre cords.
- Nutrition Trading (International) Ltd of Studley, Warwickshire for Speciality animal feeds.
- Oceanair Marine Ltd of Chichester, West Sussex for Blinds and flyscreens for windows and hatches for boats and vehicles.
- Oxford Instruments Plasma Technology Ltd of Yatton, Bristol for Plasma processing and ion beam etching and deposition equipment.
- Oyster Marine of Ipswich, Suffolk for Deck saloon cruising yachts.
- PAV Data Systems Ltd of Windermere, Cumbria for Wireless optical data transmission systems using infra-red lasers.
- Paradise Datacom Limited of Tiptree, Essex for Satellite communications equipment.
- Phase 1 Clinical Trials Unit Limited of Derriford, Plymouth for Clinical research on compounds for the pharmaceutical industry.
- Pinacl Cables of Rhyl, Denbighshire, Wales for Fibre optic cables.
- Quasar Microwave Technology Ltd of Newton Abbot, Devon for Microwave frequency waveguide components.
- Randox Laboratories Ltd of Crumlin, County Antrim, for Northern Ireland Diagnostic kits for medical, veterinary and environmental monitoring.
- Renishaw plc of Wotton-under-Edge, for Gloucestershire Metrology products enabling measurement to international standards.
- Rochford Thompson Equipment Ltd of Newbury, Berkshire for Passport reading equipment.
- Scottish Biomedical of Glasgow, Scotland for Biomedical consultancy services.
- Shadbolt & Co Solicitors of Reigate, Surrey for Commercial legal services.
- Shipley Europe Limited of Coventry for Speciality chemicals.
- David S Smith Worldwide Dispensers of London SW19 for Precision engineered plastic taps, dispensers and valves.
- Software 2000 Limited of Oxford for Driver software technologies for printers and copiers.
- Special Commissions Department, Spink & Son Ltd of London WC1 for Decorations, medals and presentation gifts.
- Stoneridge-Pollak Limited of Cheltenham, Gloucestershire for Electro-mechanical switches for the automotive industry.
- Targus Europe Ltd of Hounslow, Middlesex for Accessories for mobile computers.
- Thermomax Limited of Bangor, County Down, for Northern Ireland Vacuum tube solar collectors for water heating and also refrigeration controllers.
- M & A Thomson Litho Ltd of East Kilbride, Glasgow, for Scotland Printing material and software.
- Thorne International Boiler Services Limited of Bilston, Wolverhampton for Refurbishment and repair of industrial boilers.
- The University of Nottingham of Nottingham for Higher educational and research services.
- Vicon Motion Systems Limited of Oxford for Systems capturing the 3-dimensional motion of objects, particularly the human body.
- Vision in Business Ltd of London WC2 for Business information services.
- Wagtech International Ltd of Thatcham, Berkshire for Laboratory, water and environmental testing equipment.
- John Wood Group PLC of Aberdeen, Scotland for New generation contracting, solutions and services to the global energy industries.
- Wykes, A Division of Peel Street & Co Ltd of Leicester for Covered elastic yarns.
- Zenith Print & Packaging Ltd of Treforest, Pontypridd, Wales for Printed giftset packaging.
