= Porto Garibaldi–Agostino gas field =

Italian gas field in the Adriatic Sea

Porto Garibaldi—Agostino
- Country: Italy
- Region: Adriatic Sea
- Offshore/onshore: offshore
- Operator: Eni

Field history
- Discovery: 1951
- Start of development: 1951
- Start of production: 1955

Production
- Current production of gas: 1.77×10^{6} m^{3}/d 57×10^{6} cu ft/d 0.63×10^{9} m^{3}/a (22×10^{9} cu ft/a)
- Estimated oil in place: 4 million barrels (~5.5×10^{5} t)
- Estimated gas in place: 100.6×10^{9} m^{3} 3.5×10^{12} cu ft

The Porto Garibaldi–Agostino gas field natural gas field located on the continental shelf of the Adriatic Sea. It was discovered in 1951 and developed by Eni. It began production in 1955 and produces natural gas and condensates. The total proven reserves of the Porto Garibaldi—Agostino gas field are around 3500 billion cubic feet (100.6 billion m³), and production is slated to be around 57 million cubic feet/day (1.77×10^{5}m³) in 2010.
