= Olimpiysky oil field =

Romanian natural resource

Olimpiysky
- Country: Romania
- Region: Black Sea
- Offshore/onshore: offshore

Field history
- Discovery: 2001

Production
- Estimated oil in place: 9.9 million tonnes (~ 10×10^{6} m^{3} or 70 million bbl)
- Estimated gas in place: 10×10^{9} m^{3} 350×10^{9} cu ft

The Olimpiysky field is a Romanian oil field that was discovered in 2001 and located on the continental shelf of the Black Sea. It will begin production in 2016 and will produce oil and natural gas. The total proven reserves of the Olimpiysky oil field are around 70 million barrels (11,000,000 m^{3}), and production will be centered on 5,000 barrels per day (790 m^{3}/d) in 2016.
