= Kamchia gas field =

Natural gas field in the Black Sea, offshore Bulgaria

Kamchia
- Country: Bulgaria
- Region: Black Sea
- Block: Galata
- Offshore/onshore: offshore
- Operator: PetroCeltic

Field history
- Discovery: 1993
- Start of development: 1993
- Start of production: 1998

Production
- Current production of gas: 1.1×10^{6} m^{3}/d 40×10^{6} cu ft/d 0.4×10^{9} m^{3}/a (14×10^{9} cu ft/a)
- Estimated gas in place: 4.9×10^{9} m^{3} 172×10^{9} cu ft

The Kamchia gas field is a natural gas field located on the continental shelf of the Black Sea, offshore of Bulgaria in the Galata block. Discovered in 1993, it was developed by PetroCeltic, beginning production of natural gas and condensates in 1998. By 2015 the total proven reserves of the Kamchia gas field were around 172 billion ft^{3} (4.9 km^{3}), with a production rate of around 40 million ft^{3}/day (1.1×10^{6} m^{3}).
