= Rovegnatta oil field =

Oil field in Piedmont, Italy

Rovegnatta
- Country: Italy
- Region: Piedmont
- Offshore/onshore: onshore
- Operator: Eni

Field history
- Discovery: 2000
- Start of production: 2000

Production
- Current production of oil: 10,000 barrels per day (~5.0×10^{5} t/a)
- Estimated oil in place: 26.8 million tonnes (~ 30×10^{6} m^{3} or 200 million bbl)

The Rovegnatta oil field is an oil field located in Lecco, Piedmont. It was discovered in 2000 and developed by Eni. It began production in 2000 and produces oil. The total proven reserves of the Rovegnatta oil field are around 200 million barrels (26.8 million tonnes), and production is centered on 10,000 barrels per day (1,600 m^{3}/d).
