= Elmworth gas field =

Natural gas field in Canada

Elmworth
- Country: Canada
- Region: Alberta
- Offshore/onshore: onshore
- Coordinates: 55.0408763°N 119.6413005°W

Field history
- Discovery: 1976
- Start of production: 1980

Production
- Current production of gas: 28.3×10^{6} m^{3}/d 1,000×10^{6} cu ft/d 10.3×10^{9} m^{3}/a (360×10^{9} cu ft/a)
- Estimated oil in place: 141 million tonnes (~ 200×10^{6} m^{3} or 1000 million bbl)
- Estimated gas in place: 571×10^{9} m^{3} 20×10^{12} cu ft

The Elmworth gas field is a Canadian natural gas field that was discovered in 1976. It began production in 2014 and produces natural gas and condensates. The total proven reserves of the Elmworth gas field are around 20 trillion cubic feet (571 billion m³) and production is slated to be around 1 billion cubic feet/day (28.3 million m³).
