= Obzor gas field =

Natural gas field in the Black Sea, offshore Bulgaria

Obzor
- Country: Bulgaria
- Region: Black Sea
- Block: Galata
- Offshore/onshore: offshore
- Operator: PetroCeltic

Field history
- Discovery: 1993
- Start of development: 1993
- Start of production: 2018

Production
- Current production of gas: 1.1×10^{6} m^{3}/d 40×10^{6} cu ft/d 0.4×10^{9} m^{3}/a (14×10^{9} cu ft/a)
- Estimated gas in place: 4.5×10^{9} m^{3} 158×10^{9} cu ft

The Obzor gas field is a natural gas field located on the continental shelf of the Black Sea, offshore of Bulgaria in the Galata block. Discovered in 1993, it was developed by PetroCeltic, determining it to have initial total proven reserves of around 158 billion ft^{3} (4.5 km^{3}). It will begin production of natural gas and condensates in 2018, with a production rate of around 40 million ft^{3}/day (1.1 million m^{3}).
