= Barbara gas field =

Italian gas field in the Adriatic Sea

Barbara
- Country: Italy
- Region: Adriatic Sea
- Offshore/onshore: offshore
- Operator: Eni

Field history
- Discovery: 1971
- Start of development: 1971
- Start of production: 1975

Production
- Current production of gas: 4.8×10^{6} m^{3}/d 155×10^{6} cu ft/d 1.71×10^{9} m^{3}/a (60×10^{9} cu ft/a)
- Estimated oil in place: 4 million barrels (~5.5×10^{5} t)
- Estimated gas in place: 40×10^{9} m^{3} 1.391×10^{12} cu ft

The Barbara gas field natural gas field located on the continental shelf of the Adriatic Sea. It was discovered in 1971 and developed by Eni. It began production in 1975 and produces natural gas and condensates. The total proven reserves of the Barbara gas field are around 1391 billion cubic feet (40 billion m^{3}), and production is slated to be around 155 million cubic feet/day (4.8×10^{5}m^{3}) in 2010.
