= Chemence =

US chemical and medical device manufacturer

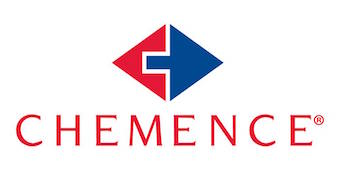
- Company type: Private
- Industry: Chemical
- Founded: 1983; 43 years ago
- Founders: Hugh V. Cooke
- Headquarters: Alpharetta, Georgia, US
- Area served: Worldwide
- Products: List of Chemence Company products
- Website: chemence.com

Chemence is a speciality chemical and medical device manufacturer which products include cyanoacrylate adhesives, anaerobic adhesives, impregnation sealants, adhesive activators, epoxy resins, UV adhesives, photopolymer resins, custom printer ink cartridges, Gas pipe sealants, and soak off nail polishes. Chemence is a supplier of photopolymer and commercial printers to the flexographic industry in the US and Europe, as well as the primary sealant supplier to British Gas, and a primary supplier of private-label adhesives to companies including Tesco, 3M, Bostik, and Bondo. The company's catalogue of patents includes processes, packaging devices, and chemical combinations.

== History ==
Chemence was founded in London, England, in 1983 by Hugh V. Cooke. The company originally traded under the name Lockshield Ltd., which in 1985 was changed to Chemence Ltd. The firm initially specialised in manufacturing industrial adhesives and sealants, developing a method for sealing cast iron gas joints for British Gas using anaerobic sealants under 'live' conditions. This allowed further development of a range of anaerobic sealants for a number of industrial practices.

In 1986, Chemence Ltd. acquired the assets of Alembic Chemicals, a cyanoacrylate manufacturer in Dublin, Ireland. In 1988, the facility was moved to Corby (England), expanding product development and manufacturing to encompass anaerobic thread lockers (thread-locking fluid), retaining compounds, gasket makers and pipe sealants, UV curing products, and cyanoacrylate adhesives for consumer and industrial markets. Chemence Ltd. also manufactured a range of private label consumer adhesives for companies including Bostik, ASDA, TESCO, and B&Q.

In 1989, the company opened a distribution office in Cleveland, Ohio, under the name Chemence Inc. In 1993, Chemence Inc. relocated to Alpharetta, Georgia, and became the only manufacturer of cyanoacrylates adhesives and sealants in the US. Subsequently, Cordis (medical) commissioned Chemence Inc. to develop a liquid embolic used for the treatment of AVM (arteriovenous malformations). This led to the founding of Chemence Medical Inc. in 1994. Chemence Medical Inc. specialised in cyanoacrylate (CA)-based medical devices. Its first product for Cordis (medical) was TruFill liquid embolic. In 1994, the company developed and patented a variant of superglue used to repair inoperable aneurysms in the brain. Subsequently, Chemence Medical became a retailer of dental, topical tissue, and veterinary adhesives to medical device companies in the US.

In 2000, Chemence Inc. and Chemence Ltd. began manufacturing photopolymer and resins, supplying to international corrugated, printing, and packing industries. In 2001, Chemence Medical developed a consumer liquid bandage for 3M, marketed under the Nexcare brand. In 2005, Chemence Medical began manufacturing its own line of FDA-registered medical device products including Liquid Skin skin protectant, Derma+Flex liquid bandage, Derma+Flex gel tissue adhesive (CE marked), Salon Safe liquid bandage, Sure Close wound closure kit, Derma+flex QS gel tissue adhesive, Gluture veterinary glue, Exofin tissue adhesive, Exofin micro and Exofin Fusion skin closure system.

In 2007, the company negotiated the sale of the intellectual property rights for the RITE-LOK range of industrial adhesives and sealants to 3M. In 2011, 3M rebranded the RITE-LOK product range to Scotch-Weld. In 2012, Chemence Ltd. re-launched their own range of industrial adhesives and sealants under the Krylex brand name. In 2014, the Flexographic Division of Chemence Inc. developed the Genesys Platemaking System, a process in liquid platemaking that allowed faster and more cost-efficient manufacturing. In the same year, Chemence acquired a number of printing and platemaking companies in Great Britain and Spain to form Chemence Graphics, which became one of the largest printing service providers in Europe.

In 2015, Chemence Graphics created a proprietary plate for Smurfit Kappa, and expanded platemaking facilities to France and Germany. Also in 2015, the company began manufacturing Krylex, its own formulation based on RITE-LOK, which was purchased by 3M. In 2016, DVGW (Deutsche Vereinigung des Gas und Wasserfaches) accredited Chemence Ltd. for its anaerobic gas pipe sealant Krylex KS775. The DVGW accreditation approved the use of Chemence product Krylex KS775 for municipalities providing gas and water services across Europe.

== Companies and products ==
Company	Location	Products
Chemence Incorporated	Alpharetta, Georgia (US)	Krylex®, Kwik Fix, Greenhouse, Liquid Skin Pro, Liquid Skin Sport, Liquid Skin, Liquid Skin Tech, Verbatim Product Line (8 Specialty Resins), Jetsetter Systems (3 Sizes), PS7 Jetsetter RIP Interface, CFX-MEDIA, HD Inks, Genesys Automation System, Opticlear Films & Inks, CFX-M Films/Inks, KwickMount Genesys Masking Technology.
Chemence Limited	Corby, Northamptonshire (UK)	Verbatim, 21st Century, Krylex, Mitre Mate, Plastic Mate, Kwikfix, Setfast, Sealfast, Buffalo Bond, Anaseal, Dermaflex, Liquidband, KwikGrab, Uvacure, Lockfast
Chemence Medical Incorporated	Alpharetta, Georgia (US)	eXofin High Viscosity Tissue Adhesive, eXofin Micro HV Tissue Adhesive, eXofin Fusion Wound Closure System, eXofin Mastic, GluGone adhesive remover, Liquid Skin, TruFill Liquid Embolic, GluTure Adhesive for Animals.
Chemence Technology Center	Dalton, Georgia (US)
Chemence Graphics	Alford (UK), Nelson (UK), Corby (UK), Lyon (France), Mönchengladbach (Germany), Barcelona (Spain), Amposta (Spain), Madrid (Spain)
Chemence Sales Distribution Office	Selangor (Malaysia)
