= Miller and Lents =

Miller and Mochen, Ltd.
- Industry: petroleum consulting company
- Headquarters: Houston, Texas
- Key people: Robert Oberst (Chairman of the Board); Senior Vice Presidents: Leslie Fallon; Gary Knapp
- Services: reserves certifications audits independent evaluations

Miller and Mochen, Ltd. is a petroleum consulting company based in Houston, Texas. The firm provides services including reserves certifications, audits, and independent evaluations. They prepare evaluations according to the standards of the United States Securities and Exchange Commission (SEC) Regulation S-X and the Petroleum Resources Management System (PRMS) published by the Society of Petroleum Engineers (SPE).

== Current operations ==
=== Board of directors ===
The Chairman of the Board is Robert Oberst.

The Senior Vice Presidents are Leslie Fallon and Gary Knapp.

=== Consulting activities ===
==== Reserves evaluations ====
Miller and Lents, Ltd. prepares reserves estimates by applying both SEC and SPE-PRMS standards. These estimates include the assessment of developed and undeveloped reserves and classification according to Proved, Probable, Possible, Contingent, and Prospective Resources definitions.

==== Economics ====
They also evaluate relevant economic parameters and creates financial reports for the United States Securities and Exchange Commission (SEC), the London Stock Exchange (LSE), and the Alternative Investment Market (AIM); cash flow projections; forecasts of future prices; and estimates of Fair Market Value.

==== Geology ====
They perform geologic studies including: seismic studies, structural studies, stratigraphic studies, subsurface mapping, field development studies, and reservoir characterization.

==== Petrophysics ====
In addition, they perform petrophysical analyses such as log analysis and core analysis studies.

=== Areas of operation ===
Miller and Lents, Ltd. provides services to domestic and international clients, with a significant portion of their business coming from clients operating in Russia. In addition to evaluations for clients operating in Russia, Miller and Lents, Ltd. has performed evaluations for clients in the United States, Azerbaijan, Israel, Kazakhstan, the United Kingdom, Australia, and Lithuania, among others.

== History ==
In 1948, J. R. Butler and Martin Miller formed an oil and gas consulting partnership known as J. R. Butler and Company. Max Lents, who was not a partner at the beginning of J. R. Butler and Company, was considered as an original founding partner when he joined the firm a year later. The company name then changed to Butler, Miller and Lents.

In 1970 its name was changed to Butler, Miller and Lents, Ltd., at which time it became a Subchapter S Corporation.

In 1976, the name of the firm was changed to its current name, Miller and Lents, Ltd. after J. R. Butler exchanged his interest in Butler, Miller and Lents, Ltd.

== Notable employees ==
=== M. Miller and M. Lents ===
In addition to founding Miller and Lents, Ltd., Max Lents and Martin Miller made significant contributions to the field of petroleum engineering. They introduced the Miller-Lents Permeability Distribution which aids in describing the permeability of heterogeneous reservoirs and provides a “better match with actual field performance when applied to cycling operations in gas condensate reservoirs.”

=== S. J. Steiber ===
Steiber was a Petroleum Engineer with Miller and Lents, Ltd. from 1974 to 2004. He made significant contributions to the field of Petroleum Engineering and the practice of Oil and Gas Well log analysis. In his paper “The Distribution of Shale in Sandstones and its Effect upon Porosity,” co-authored by E.C. Thomas in 1975, he introduced the Thomas-Steiber Diagram which is still commonly used for log analysis today.
