= Unconventional (oil and gas) reservoir =

Type of hydrocarbon reservoir

Schematic unconventional reservoir classification expressed as fluid energy vs flow potential based on initials without stimulation

Unconventional (oil and gas) reservoirs, or unconventional resources (resource plays) are accumulations where oil and gas phases are tightly bound to the rock fabric by strong capillary forces, requiring specialized measures for evaluation and extraction.

== Conventional reservoir ==
Oil and gas are generated naturally at depths of around 4 or 5 km below Earth’s surface. (Note: or as little as 2-3 km for thermogenic gas, depending on the Geothermal gradient of Earth's crust, which varies at different locations; less common biogenic methane forms at much shallower depths) Being lighter than the water-saturated rocks below the water table, the oil and gas are driven by buoyancy up through aquifer pathways towards Earth's surface over time. Some of the oil and gas percolate all the way to the surface as natural seepages, either on land or on the sea floor. The rest remains trapped underground by geological barriers (Note: where the capillary entry pressures are higher than the buoyancy pressure of the oil and gas) in a variety of trap geometries. In this way, underground pockets of oil and gas accumulate by displacing water in porous rock. If the pockets are permeable, they are referred to as conventional reservoirs. Wells are drilled into these reservoirs to create a path for oil and gas to reach the surface. When pressure differences are relatively high, oil and gas rise to the well bore naturally through buoyancy. (Note: when oil reaches its bubble point and gas is exsolved, the natural expansion of gas on ascent creates additional energy to lift fluids in the borehole to the surface much faster than by buoyancy alone, producing a blowout if not controlled) Where the pressures are low, flow can be assisted with pumps (e.g. nodding donkeys).

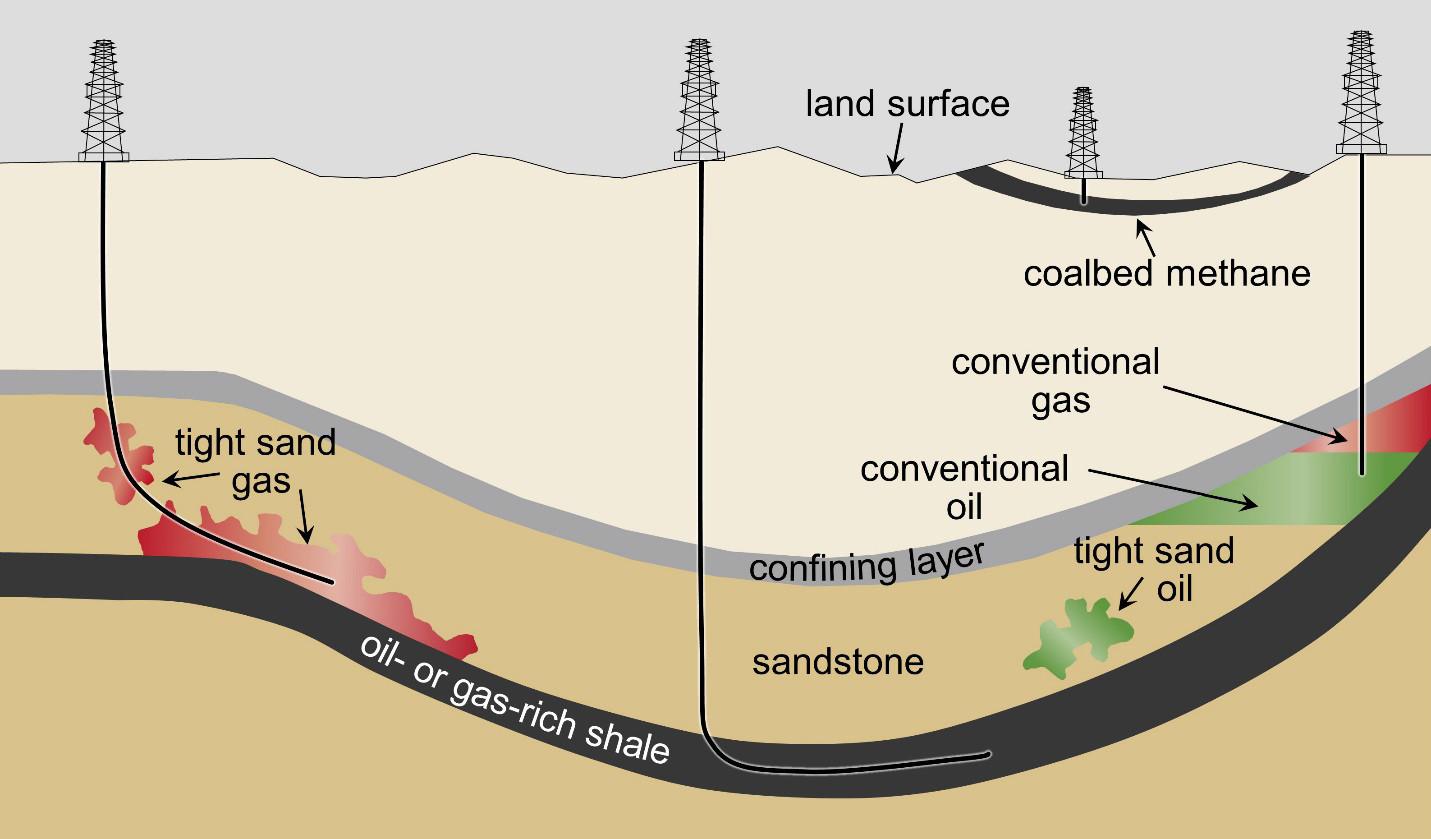
Schematic cross-section of general types of oil and gas resources featuring unconventional as well as conventional reservoirs

== History ==
In the early days of the oil industry, there was no need for stimulation to improve recovery efficiency, because supply vastly outstripped demand and leaving "difficult" oil in the ground was economically expedient. Two world wars, followed by huge economic growth resulted in surging demand for cheap portable energy, while the availability of new conventional oil and gas resources declined. (Note: the expression "conventional resources" refers to oil or gas derived from conventional reservoirs) The industry initially sought to enhance recovery of trapped oil and gas, using techniques like restricted, or low volume hydraulic fracturing to stimulate the reservoir further, (Note: restricted hydraulic fracturing (aka fracking or fraccing) compensates for formation damage in proximity to the well bore, whereas pervasive or high volume fraccing penetrates deep into the surrounding rock strata. Fraccing works by allowing oil or gas to flow to the well-bore by opening fracture pathways through impermeable rock) thereby reducing the volume of oil and gas left in the ground to an economic minimum. (Note: the costs of enhancing recovery are high)

Around 1976, the United States Department of Energy directed groundbreaking research that catalyzed several industrial innovations:

- Use of nitrogen foam to stimulate production from shale wells
- Discovery of how natural gas is stored in coal seams and fractured shales
- Recognition of the importance of interconnected natural fractures in the production of gas
- First use of directional drilling in shale reservoirs to improve productivity by intersecting fractures
- Creation of advanced tools and methods for measuring the properties of unconventional reservoir rocks
- Early development of micro-seismic monitoring techniques for mapping hydraulically-created fractures

By the turn of the millennium, a new kind of energy resource was required, particularly by the USA, who were driven to achieve energy independence. The USA turned to unconventional reservoirs to achieve their goals, which had been known about for decades but had previously been too costly to be economically attractive. Today, unconventional reservoirs include basin-centered gas, shale gas, coalbed methane (CBM), gas hydrates, tar sands, light tight oil and oil shale, mostly from North America.

== Essential differences between conventional and unconventional reservoirs ==
The distinction between conventional and unconventional resources reflects differences in the qualities of the reservoir and/or the physical properties of the oil and gas (i.e. permeability and/or viscosity). These characteristics significantly impact predictability (risk to find, appraise and develop) and in turn the methods of extraction from those reservoirs such as fracking.

Conventional oil and gas accumulations are concentrated by buoyancy driven aquifer pathways into discrete geological traps, which are detectable from the surface. These traps constitute relatively small but high resource density fields. Most conventional oil or gas fields initially flow naturally by buoyancy alone into the well bore, with their limits defined by fluid mechanics measurable from the well bore (e.g. fluid pressure, OWC/GWC etc.). In general, the technical and commercial risk associated with discrete conventional reservoirs can be reduced using relatively inexpensive remote techniques such as reflection seismology and extracted with relatively few appraisal and development wells.

Unconventional reservoirs, in contrast, are regionally dispersed over large areas with no indicative trap geometry that can be used for predictive purposes. The oil and gas in unconventional reservoirs are generally low density resources, frequently trapped in the rock by strong capillary forces incapable of flowing naturally through buoyancy. The limits of an unconventional field are therefore usually defined by relatively expensive well testing for delivery. Extraction from unconventional reservoirs requires changing the physical properties of the reservoir, or the flow characteristics of the fluid, (Note: e.g. tar sands and immature oil shales) using techniques such as fracking or steam injection. The technical and commercial risk associated with unconventional reservoirs is generally higher than conventional reservoirs owing to the lack of predictability of the trap extent and of the reservoir quality, which requires extensive well placement and testing to determine the economic reserves/well limit defined by well delivery. (Note: risking for conventional reservoirs is primarily in finding the resource; in unconventional, it is finding a quality resource, defining the resource limits (measured by the EUR per well), which means the well itself defines the extent of commercial viability)

| Reservoir | Phase | Density (Note: resource density defined here as the concentration of oil or gas by unit area because it determines the number of wells needed for efficient extraction) | Flow (Note: main influences on fluid dynamics) | Main predictors (Note: tool or technique for evaluating the extent and limits of an oil or gas resource) | Min extraction (Note: technique for extracting the minimum amount of oil or gas) |
|---|---|---|---|---|---|
| Conventional (Note: defined as porous or naturally fractured rock formations where percolating oil or gas have migrated into geological traps) | Oil & gas | high | buoyancy | Well bore pressure;Reflection seismic | Well bore |
| Basin-centered gas (Note: defined as natural gas held by capillary forces in low-permeability non-fissile rock) | gas | low | capillary | drilling | well bore (fracking) |
| Shale gas (Note: defined as natural gas held by capillary forces in low-permeability, typically fissile, mudrock) | gas | low | capillary | drilling | well bore (fracking) |
| Coalbed Methane (Note: defined as natural gas adsorbed into the solid matrix of low-permeability coal seams) | gas | high | adsorption | drilling | well bore (depressurization) |
| Gas hydrates (Note: defined as natural gas held as methane hydrate on the seabed, in ocean and deep lake sediments and permafrost regions trapped in hydrogen bonded, frozen water molecules) | gas | high | ?buoyancy? | Reflection seismic; drilling | ?mining/well bore? |
| Tar sands (Note: defined as viscous oil held by capillary forces in unconsolidated sediments containing mixtures of sand, clay and water) | oil | high | ?capillary? | drilling/mining | steam flood |
| Light Tight Oil (Note: also known as tight oil or shale oil, is defined as light crude oil contained within restricted pore space of low permeability sedimentary rock) | oil | low | capillary | drilling | well bore (fracking) |
| Oil shales (Note: defined as a fine-grained sedimentary rock rich in thermally immature organic material, which requires industrial processing (retorting) to distill oil from the rock) | oil | high | bonded | mining | retort (sub mature) |

=== Environmental differences ===
As with all forms of fossil fuel, there are established issues with greenhouse gas emissions through export (distribution) as well as consumption (combustion), which are identical whether the oil or gas are derived from conventional or unconventional reservoirs. Their carbon footprints, however, are radically different: conventional reservoirs use the natural energy in the environment to flow oil and gas to the surface unaided; unconventional reservoirs require putting energy into the ground for extraction, either as heat (e.g. tar sands and oil shales) or as pressure (e.g. shale gas and CBM). The artificial transfer of heat and pressure require the use of large volumes of fresh water creating supply and disposal issues. The distribution of the resource over large areas creates land use issues, with implications for local communities on infrastructure, freight traffic and local economies. Impact on the environment is an unavoidable consequence of all human activity but the difference between the impact of conventional reservoirs compared with unconventional is significant, measurable and predictable.

== See also ==
- Alternative fuel
- Coalbed methane
- Creveney shale mining operation
- Energy development
- Environmental impact of fracking
- Extreme energy
- Fracking in the United States
- Future energy development
- Hubbert peak theory
- Methane clathrate (gas hydrate)
- Oil megaprojects
- Oil sands
- Petroleum trap
- Renewable energy
- Shale gas
- Source rock
- Substitute natural gas, such as oil shale gas
- Tight gas
- Tight oil
- World energy supply and consumption
