= Gaffney, Cline & Associates =

British energy consultancy

GaffneyCline
- Industry: Energy
- Founded: 1962
- Headquarters: London, United Kingdom
- Services: Resource assessment & development; Policy & commercial advice; Gas & LNG; Refining & petrochemicals; Carbon management & energy transition
- Number of employees: 100+
- Parent: Baker Hughes
- Website: www.gaffneycline.com

GaffneyCline is a global consultancy in the energy sector, providing techno-commercial advice to clients that include energy producers, financial institutions, governments, etc. GaffneyCline is an independent wholly owned subsidiary of Baker Hughes.

One of the notable functions of GaffneyCline, along with similar petroleum industry consultants such as DeGolyer and MacNaughton, Netherland, Sewell, RPS-APA and Ryder Scott, is to provide third-party verification and/or valuation of oil and natural gas reserves - typically 1P proven reserves, but also 2P probable reserves and 3P possible reserves - for company annual reports and SEC filing 20-F. In addition to commercial and technical studies in the oil and gas sector, GaffneyCline has expertise in Carbon Management, more specifically CCUS, hydrogen, carbon intensity estimation and abatement.

== History ==
Peter Gaffney and Ben Cline, both petroleum engineers working in oil and gas in South America, found they both shared a dream to have their own consultancy. They believed that the oil and gas industry could benefit from independent technical and management expertise, such as suggestions on how to improve production, where to drill and how to be more efficient. In 1962 they founded Gaffney, Cline & Associates (GaffneyCline) in Trinidad, establishing offices in Houston, London, Singapore, Buenos Aires, Sydney and Russia.

In the mid 1960s, GaffneyCline expanded into the United Kingdom with a view to use the rapidly developing North Sea as a springboard for growth. Further expansion in Singapore would follow in the late 1960s to capitalize on growth in crucial Asia Pacific markets (particularly Indonesia), which had become focus investment areas for major and independent oil companies. The late 1970s would see GaffneyCline increase market penetration throughout the Americas and internationally in every major hydrocarbon region around the world.

Since 2008, GaffneyCline has been a subsidiary of Baker Hughes.

== Awards ==
- Queen's Award for Export Achievement 1993
- Queen's Award for Export Achievement 2001

== See also ==
- DeGolyer and MacNaughton
