= Ryder Scott =

Petroleum consulting firm based in Houston, Texas

- Industry: Oil and Gas Engineering, Geological Consultants
- Founded: 1937 in Bradford, Pennsylvania
- Founder: Harry M. Ryder and David Scott Jr.
- Headquarters: Houston, Texas
- Website: https://ryderscott.com

Ryder Scott Company is a petroleum consulting firm based in Houston, Texas, United States. The firm independently estimates oil and gas reserves, future production profiles and cashflow economics, including discounted net present values. It assesses oil reserves and evaluates oil and gas properties.

== History ==
The company was founded in Bradford, Pennsylvania on July 1, 1937, by Harry M. Ryder, a prominent petroleum engineer who died in 1954, and David Scott, Jr.

In 1967, Ryder Scott acquired Robert W. Harrison & Co., moved to Houston, and transitioned from waterflood design to evaluation engineering, Ryder Scott's core business. This expansion was driven by increased volume of work that came with the increase in new clients. Key projects include a contract with Seven Seas that led to the 1997 report of the net proved reserves for the Guadas Field, which indicated a 32.16 million-barrel estimate.

In 2004, after Shell disclosed major downward revisions to its proved reserves, Ryder Scott was hired to provide independent review and reserve estimates to help restore investor confidence.

Today, Ryder Scott maintains offices in Houston, Denver, and Calgary, employing more than sixty petroleum engineers and geoscientists.

== See also ==
- GaffneyCline
