= Society of Petroleum Evaluation Engineers =

Non-profit professional organisation

- Founded: September 24, 1962
- Founder: Harold Vance, William Hurst and H.F. Poyner, Jr.
- Type: Professional Organization
- Region served: Worldwide
- Method: Meetings, Conferences, Publications, Training
- Members: 540
- Key people: Barry Ashton (President), Marshall Watson (Vice President), Rick Krenek (Secretary-Treasurer)
- Website: www.spee.org

The Society of Petroleum Evaluation Engineers (SPEE) is a non-profit professional organization with the objectives to promote the profession of petroleum evaluation engineering, to foster the spirit of scientific research among its Members, and to disseminate facts pertaining to petroleum evaluation engineering among its Members and the public.
