= Water contact =

In the hydrocarbon industry water contact is the elevation above which fluids other than water can be found in the pores of a rock.

For example, in a traditional hand-excavated water well, the level at which the water stabilizes represents the water table, or the elevation in the rock where air starts to occupy the rock pores.

In most situations in the hydrocarbon industry the term is qualified as being an oil-water contact (abbreviated to "OWC") or a gas-water contact ("GWC"). Often there is also a gas-oil contact ("GOC").

In an oil or gas field, hydrocarbons migrate into rocks and can be trapped if there is a permeability barrier to prevent upward escape. Gas and oil are lighter than water, so they will form a bubble at the high end of the "trap" formed by the impermeable barriers. A simple physical model of this would be a coffee cup held upside down underwater with an air bubble occupying the highest portion of the cup's interior. The base of the bubble is the water contact.

Capillary action can obscure the true water contact in permeable media like sandstone. Capillary pressure prevents the hydrocarbons from expelling all of the water in the pores, which creates a transition zone between the fully saturated hydrocarbon levels and the fully saturated water levels.

In poorly porous intervals, the oil-water, gas-water or gas-oil contacts can similarly be obscured, which makes estimation of hydrocarbon reserves difficult. Descriptions of the well's petrophysics will then often further qualify to delineate a gas-down-to, oil-up-to, oil-down-to and water-up-to line, clearly showing the uncertainties involved.

== See also ==
Fluid Contact
