= Gas depletion =

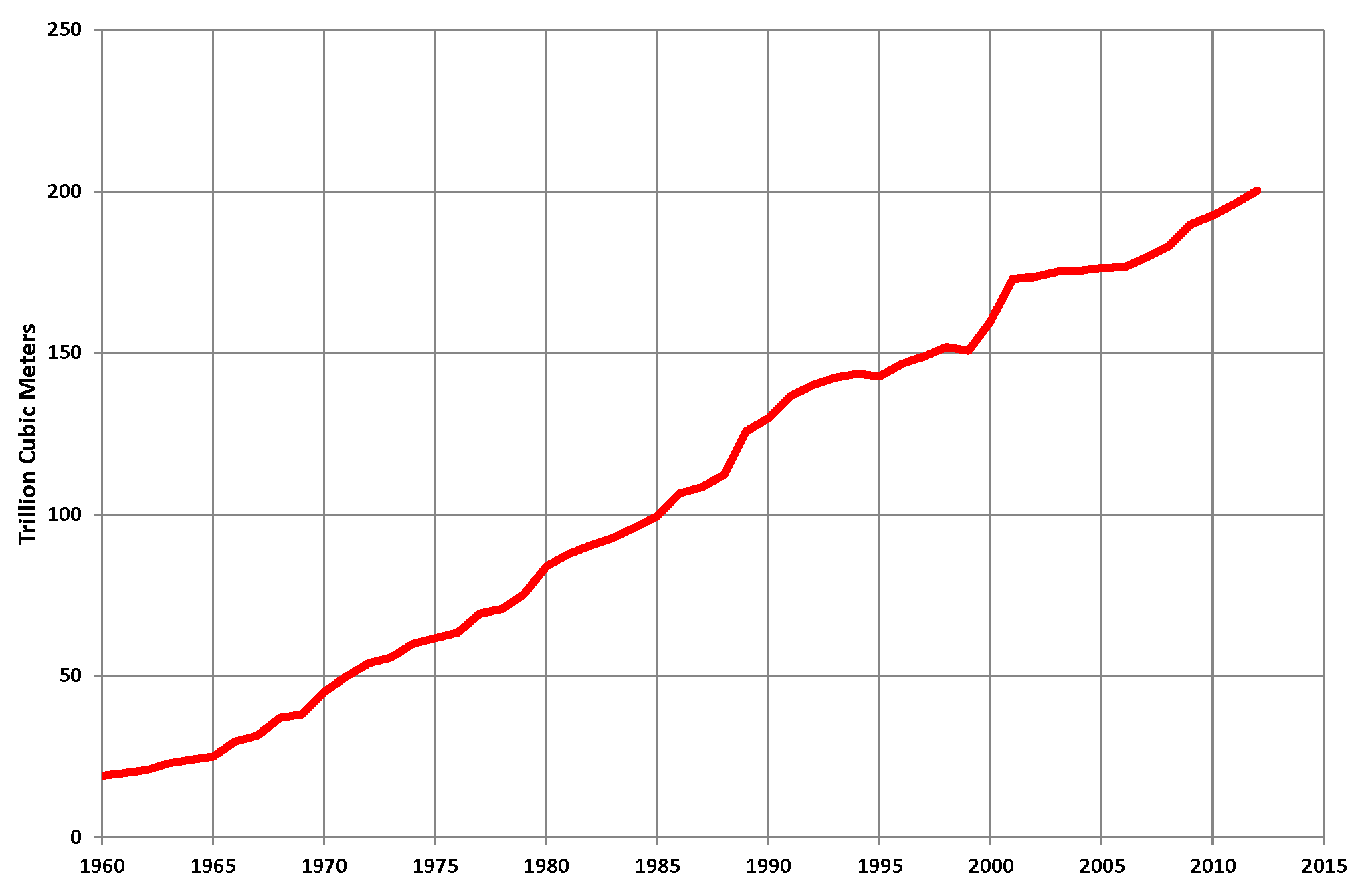
Proven global natural gas reserves between 1960 and 2012 (OPEC)

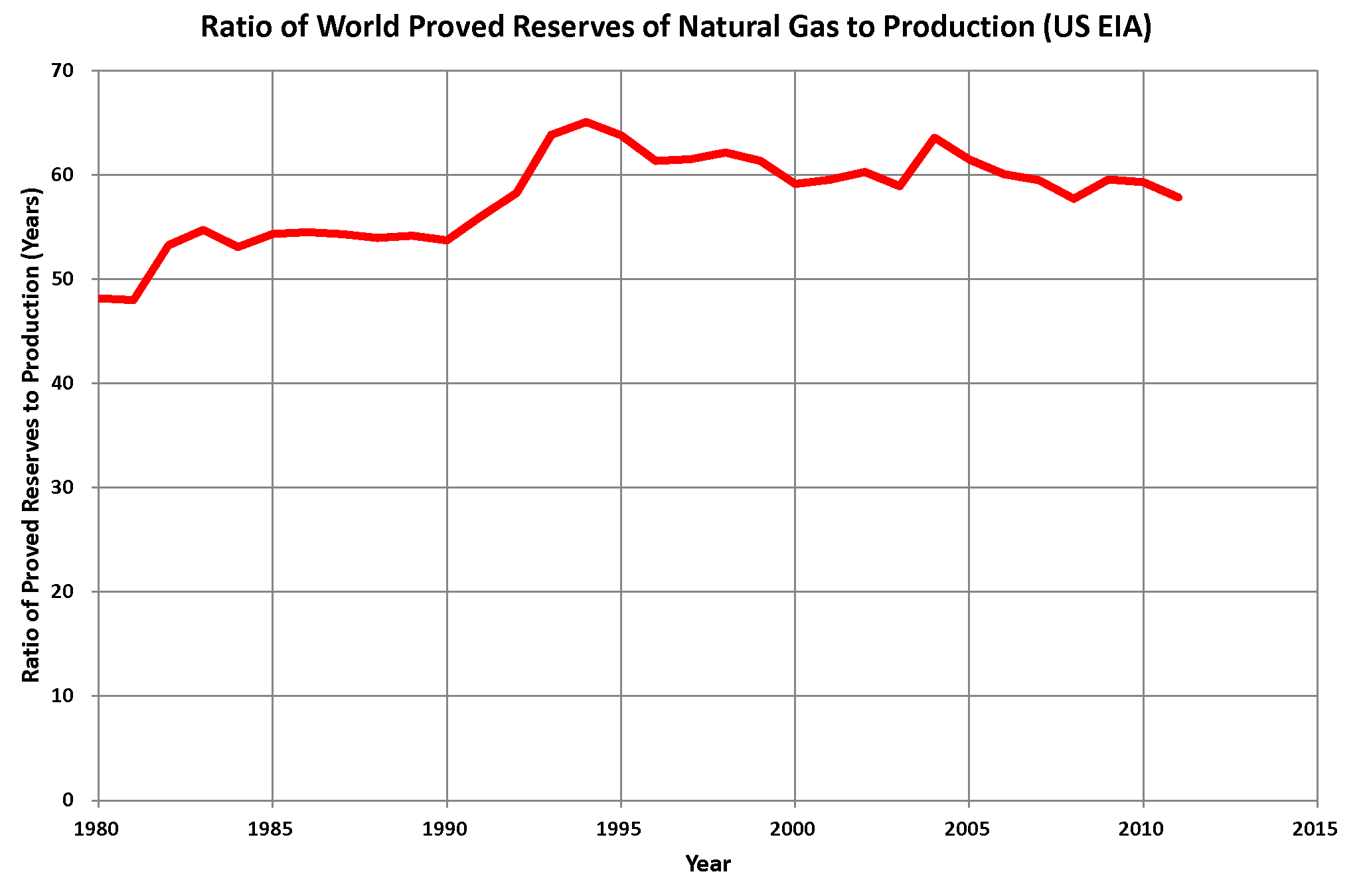
Ratio of world proved gas reserves to production, 1980-2011

Gas depletion is the decline in natural gas production of a well, gas field, or geographic area.

== Depletion rate ==
According to the US Energy Information Administration, in 1980 the world had enough proved gas reserves to last 48 years at the 1980 rate of production. Cumulative world gas production from 1980 through 2011 was greater than the proved gas reserves in 1980. In 2011, world proved gas reserves were enough to last 58 years at 2011 production levels, even though the 2011 production rate was more than double the 1980 rate. At current consumption levels, there are 52 years of proven gas reserves left. However, proven gas reserves have been consistently increasing over time.

== Role of new technology ==
As new technologies for natural gas production are discovered, the world's ultimate reserves can grow. Although some predictions of ultimate reserve recovery include provisions for new technology, not every magnitude of breakthrough can be accurately accounted for.

More than half the increase in US natural gas production from 2006 to 2008 came from Texas, where production rose 15% between the first quarter of 2007 and the first quarter of 2008. This was mostly due to improved technology, which allowed the production of deepwater offshore and "unconventional" resources. Important new developments were horizontal drilling and fracking in a geologic formation known as the Barnett Shale, underlying the city of Fort Worth, which is a highly impermeable formation and difficult to produce by conventional means. The Barnett Shale now produces 6% of US natural gas. Other shale gas formations in the lower 48 states are widely distributed, and are known to contain large resources of natural gas.

== Alternative viewpoints ==
- "In 2010, the United States used 24.1 Tcf of natural gas." https://web.archive.org/web/20120408222753/http://www.naturalgas.org/business/supply.asp further cites estimates of reserves (from multiple independent analysts) ranging from 2,632 trillion cubic feet (Tcf) of technically recoverable natural gas resources in the United States to as low as 1,451 Tcf.
- "92 years worth of natural gas is technically recoverable using ... today’s technology" http://energytomorrow.org/blog/a-paucity-of-scarcity/

== See also ==
- Peak gas
- Reserves-to-production ratio
- Methanogenesis is the formation of methane by microbes known as methanogens.
