= DeGolyer and MacNaughton =

American petroleum consulting company

- DeGoyler in 1913
- Industry: Petroleum Consulting Services
- Founded: 1936 in Texas
- Founder: Everette Lee DeGolyer and Lewis MacNaughton
- Headquarters: Dallas, Texas
- Area served: Worldwide
- Key people: John W. Wallace (CEO)
- Website: www.demac.com

DeGolyer and MacNaughton is a petroleum consulting company based in Dallas, Texas, with offices in Houston, Buenos Aires, and Algiers.

DeGolyer and MacNaughton was founded in 1936 by Everette Lee DeGolyer and Lewis MacNaughton. DeGolyer had formerly known McNaughton through their work with the petroleum exploration company Amerada. While serving as President, DeGolyer hired McNaughton to work for Amerada in 1928.

== Company founding and early years ==
In the 1930s bankers began offering essential long-term loans to prospective oil companies only after they had secured the unknown, subterranean collateral of the oil reserves at a particular site, which required the banks to rely on the integrity, competence, honesty, and experience of those individual assessing the value of the reserves. New financing methods were required which created a need for reliable and fully independent studies and evaluations of reservoirs. DeGolyer and McNaughton was established to meet these needs.

On October 30, 1936, Everett DeGolyer drafted an informal business proposition inquiring whether Lewis McNaughton,"might be willing, from time to time, to associate himself with me in doing...geological and other work." DeGolyer originally guaranteed a minimum salary of $350 a month to McNaughton with the possibility of greater remuneration if business developed. On October 18, McNaughton signed the proposal, establishing what would eventually become "one of the most prestigious geological consulting firms in the world". In the companies early years in 1939, DeGolyer worked for a period with McNaughton to find a "consistent and accurate system of evaluation for oil properties", a task which was best suited to independent geologists not attached to a specific oil company, whose employees might be prone to exaggerate the value of a particular site to obtain investment dollars. Recognizing the importance of obtaining accurate data of existing oil wells for comparison studies and other purposes, the company kept records on cards of individual wells and properties that would eventually number in the millions.

Recognizing the importance of DeGolyer's contributions to petroleum exploration, DeGolyer’s peers’ created the DeGolyer Distinguished Service Medal to recognize the scope and value of his service to the petroleum industry. DeGolyer was the first recipient, in 1966, of the DeGolyer Distinguished Service Medal awarded by the Society of Petroleum Engineers, which recognizes "distinguished service to SPE, the profession of engineering and geology, and to the petroleum industry."

Though appraising to obtain financing was one of its early tasks, the firm also performed general geological surveys, studies of oilfield development, and even the evaluation of problems with management. In its first decade the company completed over a thousand contracts representing fourteen of the worlds largest twenty oil companies, as well as hundreds of contracts with smaller entities and a number of the larger natural gas companies. It served as a consultant for companies in Mexico, Peru, Uruguay, Brazil, Ecuador, Columbia, Venezuela and Trinidad, and would later work with the United States Government to evaluate oil in Alaska and the critical Middle East.

== Divisions ==
The firm portrays itself as having extensive experience in all the oil producing regions in the world and has divisions in:

- Asia Pacific/Latin America
- Central Europe/Asia
- Europe/Africa
- North America
- Reservoir Studies

== Activities ==
DeGolyer and MacNaughton Corp. provides petroleum consulting services in the United States and internationally. It offers appraisals, economic forecasts, geological studies, geophysical studies, petrophysical studies, engineering analysis, reservoir simulation, reserves assessment, and management services. It can also offer Economic Analysis, Economic Modeling, Prospective Resources Assessments, Unconventional Resources Assessments, and what it describes as Environmental, Social, and Corporate Governance Support which includes estimates of Greenhouse Gas Emissions in conformance with ISO 14064 standards. It also offers production enhancement consulting, guidance with financial reporting issues, and financial forecasting for petroleum discoveries. It serves both the petroleum industry and financial community.

In 2004, the firm acquired Calgary-based Outtrim Szabo Associates forming its office in Canada as a subsidiary company.

== Executives ==
- John W. Wallace, chairman and chief executive officer
- Charles F. Boyette, president

== See also ==
- GaffneyCline
