= Deutscher Verein des Gas- und Wasserfaches =

The Deutscher Verein des Gas- und Wasserfaches (DVGW) is the German association for gas and water with headquarters in Bonn. Its official English translation is the German Technical and Scientific Association for Gas and Water. The DVGW was founded in 1859. Its main task is to create the technical regulations for safety and reliability of gas and water supply.

== Regulation and standards ==
In addition to the preparation of the national DVGW rules it also imports the DIN, EN and ISO standards. The certification activities are done by DVGW CERT GmbH, a wholly owned subsidiary of DVGW.
