= Estimated ultimate recovery =

Estimated ultimate recovery or expected ultimate recovery (EUR) of a resource is the sum of the proven reserves at a specific time and the cumulative production up to that point.
