= Oil and gas reserves and resource quantification =

Industry concept of crude oil and natural gas reserves and resources

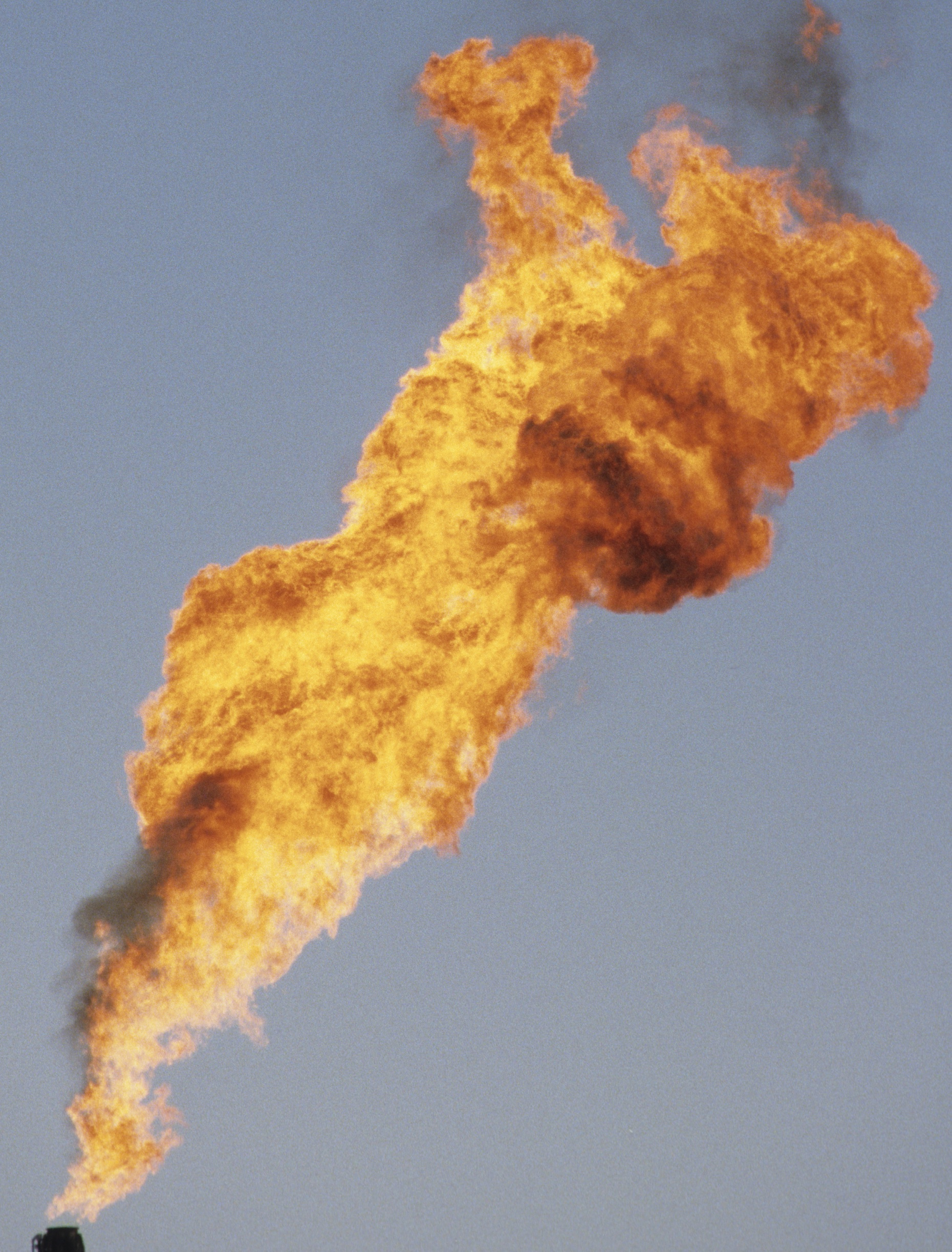
Flaring a flow test, the first outward indication of a new oil or gas discovery, which has the potential to qualify for reserves assessment

Oil and gas reserves and resource quantification refers to the process of estimating the quantities of hydrocarbons present in subsurface accumulations and assessing the portion that can be economically recovered. In the petroleum industry, a distinction is made between resources, which represent the total estimated volume of hydrocarbons in place, and reserves, which are the quantities expected to be commercially recoverable under existing economic, technological, and regulatory conditions.

Estimates are based on geological, engineering, and economic data and are inherently uncertain, typically expressed using probabilistic methods. As additional information becomes available or as economic and technological conditions change, estimates may be revised. Standardized classification systems, such as the Society of Petroleum Engineers Petroleum Resources Management System (PRMS), are used to categorize reserves and resources according to their level of certainty and commercial viability.

== Quantification ==
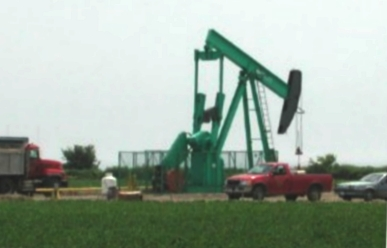
An oil well in Canada

As with other mineral resource estimation, detailed classification schemes have been devised by industry specialists to quantify volumes of oil and gas accumulated underground (known as subsurface). These schemes provide management and investors with the means to make quantitative and relative comparisons between assets, (Note: a term commonly used to identify discoveries or producing fields) before underwriting the significant cost of exploring for, developing and extracting those accumulations. Classification schemes are used to categorize the uncertainty in volume estimates of the recoverable oil and gas and the chance that they exist in reality (or risk that they do not) depending on the resource maturity. (Note: i.e. whether proven (low uncertainty) or unproven (high uncertainty)) Potential subsurface oil and gas accumulations identified during exploration are classified and reported as prospective resources. Resources are re-classified as reserves following appraisal, at the point when a sufficient accumulation of commercial oil and/or gas are proven by drilling, with authorized and funded development plans to begin production within a recommended five years.

Reserve estimates are required by authorities and companies, and are primarily made to support operational or investment decision-making by companies or organisations involved in the business of developing and producing oil and gas. Reserve volumes are necessary to determine the financial status of the company, which may be obliged to report those estimates to shareholders and "resource holders" (Note: resource holders are the legal owners of subsurface oil and gas resources and are commonly represented by the Governments of the day who own the mineral rights for oil and/or gas extraction) at the various stages of resource maturation. (Note: usually only proved reserves are reported)

Currently, the most widely accepted classification and reporting methodology is the 2018 petroleum resources management system (PRMS), which summarizes a consistent approach to estimating oil and gas quantities within a comprehensive classification framework, jointly developed by the Society of Petroleum Engineers (SPE), the World Petroleum Council (WPC), the American Association of Petroleum Geologists (AAPG), the Society of Petroleum Evaluation Engineers (SPEE) and the Society of Economic Geologists (SEG). (Note: the definitions and guidelines contained in this article must not be construed as modifying the interpretation or application of any existing regulatory reporting requirements) Public companies that register securities in the U.S. market must report proved reserves under the Securities and Exchange Commission (SEC) reporting requirements which shares many elements with PRMS. (Note: The SEC reserves have a western / capitalistic emphasis on reporting the subset of in place oil and gas resources that are expected, with high confidence, to be extracted and converted into cash in a project that is going to yield a profit. The Russian and Chinese reserve systems have an emphasis on creating an inventory of oil and gas in place that have a potential of future exploitation to meet their national needs. Profitable extraction is convenient and appreciated, but not always a requirement for their national interests.) Attempts have also been made to standardize more generalized methodologies for the reporting of national or basin level oil and gas resource assessments.

== Reserves and resource reporting ==
An oil or gas resource refers to known (discovered fields) or potential accumulations of oil and/or gas (i.e undiscovered prospects and leads) in the subsurface of the Earth's crust. All reserve and resource estimates involve uncertainty in volume estimates (expressed below as Low, Mid or High uncertainty), as well as a risk or chance to exist in reality, (Note: expressed as a Possibility of Success (POS) sometimes called the COS or Chance of Success) depending on the level of appraisal or resource maturity that governs the amount of reliable geologic and engineering data available and the interpretation of those data. (Note: Estimates for recoverable oil & gas volumes are expressed as a probability distribution with range of uncertainty from L, M, H and further sub-classified below based on project maturity and/or economic status (e.g 1C, 2C, 3C). In addition, each reserve class carries a risk, or chance to exist in reality (POS or COS) which is based on the amount and quality of available evidence. Naturally the highest chance (lowest risk) is associated with proven reserves (fields with wells and production tests) and the lowest chance (highest risk) is associated with undrilled prospects and leads where data is more sparse)

TABLE I:Classification summary featuring volumes uncertainty (low, mid or high) with increasing chance for an accumulation to exist and be commercial upwards reflecting greater resource maturity
RESOURCE CLASS	LOW	MID	HIGH
Reserves	1P	2P	3P
Contingent Resources	1C	2C	3C
Prospective Resources	1U	2U	3U

Estimating and monitoring of reserves provides an insight into, for example, a company's future production and a country's oil & gas supply potential. As such, reserves are an important means of expressing value and longevity of resources.

In the PRMS, the terms 'Resources' and 'Reserves' have distinct and specific meaning with respect to oil & gas accumulations and hydrocarbon exploration in general. However, the level of rigor required in applying these terms varies depending on the resource maturity which informs reporting requirements. (Note: e.g. internal reporting or external, public announcements and balance sheet disclosure to shareholders) Oil & gas reserves are resources that are, or are reasonably certain to be, commercial (i.e. profitable). Reserves are the main asset of an oil & gas company; booking is the process by which they are added to the balance sheet. Contingent and prospective resource estimates are much more speculative and are not booked with the same degree of rigor, generally for internal company use only, reflecting a more limited data set and assessment maturity. If published externally, these volumes add to the perception of asset value, which in turn can influence oil & gas company share or stock value. The PRMS provides a framework for a consistent approach to the estimation process to comply with reporting requirements of particularly, listed companies. (Note: PRMS, in effect, bridges the gap between western capitalist standards for reserves reporting regulated by SEC and those that serve local national interests. It provides a framework to create an inventory of resources that have the potential of becoming profitable by the implementation of development projects. Rather than focusing on in-place volumes, it is focused on the volumes that may ultimately be extracted.) Energy companies may employ specialist, independent, reserve valuation consultants to provide third party reports as part of SEC filings for either reserves or resource booking. (Note: determined by the legislative requirements and legal framework of the host Country outwith SEC regulations)

=== Reserves ===
Reserves reporting of discovered accumulations is regulated by tight controls for informed investment decisions to quantify differing degrees of uncertainty in recoverable volumes. Reserves are defined in three sub-categories according to the system used in the PRMS: Proven (1P), Probable and Possible. Reserves defined as Probable and Possible are incremental (or additional) discovered volumes based on geological and/or engineering criteria similar to those used in estimating Proven reserves. Though not classified as contingent, some technical, contractual, or regulatory uncertainties preclude such reserves being classified as Proven. The most accepted definitions of these are based on those originally approved by the SPE and the WPC in 1997, requiring that reserves are discovered, recoverable, commercial and remaining based on rules governing the classification into sub-categories and the declared development project plans applied. Probable and Possible reserves may be used internally by oil companies and government agencies for future planning purposes but are not routinely or uniformly compiled.

==== Proven reserves ====
Proven reserves are discovered volumes claimed to have a reasonable certainty of being recoverable under existing economic and political conditions, and with existing technology. Industry specialists refer to this category as "P90" (that is, having a 90% certainty of producing or exceeding the P90 volume on the probability distribution). (Note: The probabilities associated with the 1P, 2P and 3P reserve categories represent the chance to deliver or exceed the volumes declared. Perhaps counterintuitively these probabilities or chances decrease as the stated volumes increase and as such correspond to a decreasing confidence that the higher volumes can be delivered.) Proven reserves are also known in the industry as 1P. Proven reserves may be referred to as proven developed (PD) or as proven undeveloped (PUD). PD reserves are reserves that can be produced with existing wells and perforations, or from additional reservoirs where minimal additional investment (operating expense) is required (e.g. opening a set of perforations already installed). PUD reserves require additional capital investment (e.g., drilling new wells) to bring the oil and/or gas to the surface.

Accounting for production is an important exercise for businesses. Produced oil or gas that has been brought to surface (production) and sold on international markets or refined in-country are no longer reserves and are removed from the booking and company balance sheets. Until January 2010, "1P" proven reserves were the only type the U.S. SEC allowed oil companies to report to investors. Companies listed on U.S. stock exchanges may be called upon to verify their claims confidentially, but many governments and national oil companies do not disclose verifying data publicly. Since January 2010 the SEC now allows companies to also provide additional optional information declaring 2P (both proven and probable) and 3P (proven plus probable plus possible) (Note: NOTE: SEC discourages the aggregation of estimates) with discretionary verification by qualified third party consultants, though many companies choose to use 2P and 3P estimates only for internal purposes.

==== Probable and possible reserves ====
An example of a Volume Uncertainty Distribution, with the P10, P50 and P90 volumes indicated (created using a probabilistic calculation method)

Probable additional reserves are attributed to known accumulations and the probabilistic, cumulative sum of proven and probable reserves (with a probability of P50), also referred to in the industry as "2P" (Proven plus Probable) The P50 designation means that there should be at least a 50% chance that the actual volumes recovered will be equal to or will exceed the 2P estimate.

Possible additional reserves are attributed to known accumulations that have a lower chance of being recovered than probable reserves. Reasons for assigning a lower probability to recovering Possible reserves include varying interpretations of geology, uncertainty due to reserve infill (associated with variability in seepage towards a production well from adjacent areas) and projected reserves based on future recovery methods. The probabilistic, cumulative sum of proven, probable and possible reserves is referred to in the industry as "3P" (proven plus probable plus possible) where there is a 10% chance of delivering or exceeding the P10 volume.(ibid)

=== Resource estimates ===
Resource estimates are undiscovered volumes, or volumes that have not yet been drilled and flowed to surface. A non-reserve resource, by definition, does not have to be technically or commercially recoverable and can be represented by a single, or an aggregate of multiple potential accumulations, e.g. an estimated geological basin resource.

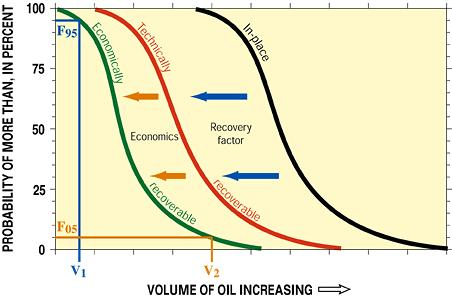
Schematic graph illustrating petroleum volumes and probabilities. Curves represent categories of oil in assessment. There is a 95% chance i.e., probability, (P95 and often referred to in the industry as F95) of at least volume V1 of economically recoverable oil, and there is a 5% chance (P05 or F05) of at least volume V2 of economically recoverable oil.

There are two non-reserve resource categories:

==== Contingent resources ====
Once a discovery has been made, prospective resources can be reclassified as contingent resources. Contingent resources are those accumulations or fields that are not yet considered mature enough for commercial development, where development is contingent on one or more conditions changing. (Note: e.g. stock market price, financial investment, technical innovations, market innovation or fiscal easing) The uncertainty in the estimates for recoverable oil & gas volumes is expressed in a probability distribution and is sub-classified based on project maturity and/or economic status (1C, 2C, 3C, ibid) and in addition are assigned a risk, or chance, to exist in reality (POS or COS).

==== Prospective resources ====
Prospective resources, being undiscovered, have the widest range in volume uncertainties and carry the highest risk or chance to be present in reality (POS or COS). At the exploration stage (before discovery) they are categorized by the wide range of volume uncertainties (typically P90-P50-P10). In the PRMS the range of volumes is classified by the abbreviations 1U, 2U and 3U again reflecting the degrees of uncertainty. (Note: uncertainty is expressed as a probabilistic range, which includes the chance or risk that hydrocarbons are absent. The combined most likely risked volume outcome, or chance-weighted mean, is called expectation) Companies are commonly not required to report publicly their views of prospective resources but may choose to do so voluntarily. (Note: SEC does not allow reporting of undiscovered resources)

== Estimation techniques ==
The total estimated quantity (volumes) of oil and/or gas contained in a subsurface reservoir, is called oil or gas initially in place (STOIIP or GIIP respectively). However, only a fraction of this oil & gas in place can be brought to the surface (recoverable), (Note: the technically recoverable volume at a given set of market conditions is called the ultimate recovery (UR) or Estimated ultimate recovery (EUR)) and it is only this producible fraction that is considered to be either reserves or a resource of any kind. The ratio between oil and gas in place and recoverable volumes is known as the recovery factor (RF), which is determined by a combination of subsurface geology and the technology applied to extraction. When reporting oil & gas volumes, in order to avoid confusion, it should be clarified whether they are oil in place or recoverable volumes.

The appropriate technique for resource estimations is determined by resource maturity. There are three main categories of technique, which are used through resource maturation to differing degrees: analog (substitution), volumetric (static) and performance-based (dynamic), which are combined to help fill gaps in knowledge or data. Both probabilistic and deterministic calculation methods are commonly used to calculate resource volumes, with deterministic methods predominantly applied to reserves estimation (low uncertainty) and probabilistic methods applied to general resource estimation (high uncertainty).

TABLE II:Estimation techniques applied with decreasing resource maturity to the right
Method	Technique	1P	2P	3P	1C	2C	3C	1U	2U	3U
Analog	YTF (No segment production)							☉	☉	☉
	YTF (With segment production)							☉	☉	☉
Volumetric	Deterministic	☉	☉	☉	☉	☉	☉	☉	☉	☉
	Probabilistic models	☉	☉	☉	☉	☉	☉	☉	☉	☉
	Static reservoir models	☉	☉	☉	☉	☉	☉			
Performance-based	Dynamic reservoir simulation	☉	☉	☉	☉					
	Material balance	☉	☉							
	Decline curve analysis	☉	☉							
Unconventional reservoir	Pilot (rate transient)	☉	☉	☉	☉	☉	☉	☉	☉	☉

The combination of geological, geophysical and technical engineering constraints means that the quantification of volumes is usually undertaken by integrated technical, and commercial teams composed primarily of geoscientists and subsurface engineers, surface engineers and economists. Because the geology of the subsurface cannot be examined directly, indirect techniques must be used to estimate the size and recoverability of the resource. While new technologies have increased the accuracy of these estimation techniques, significant uncertainties still remain, which are expressed as a range of potential recoverable oil & gas quantities using probabilistic methods. (Note: reserves are frequently reported as a single Field or prospect or lead volume are defined by a single probability distribution the shape of which defines the most likely volume outcome and the volume uncertainty range (for example P50, P90, P10). Portfolio volumes similarly are estimated by combining individual probability distributions taking into account interdependencies between portfolio elements (i.e not a simple addition of ‘most likely volume’)) In general, most early estimates of the reserves of an oil or gas field (rather than resource estimates) are conservative and tend to grow with time. This may be due to the availability of more data and/or the improved matching between predicted and actual production performance.

Appropriate external reporting of resources and reserves is required from publicly traded companies, and is an accounting process governed by strict definitions and categorisation administered by authorities regulating the stock market and complying with governmental legal requirements. Other national or industry bodies may voluntarily report resources and reserves but are not required to follow the same strict definitions and controls.

=== Analog (YTF) method ===
Analogs are applied to prospective resources in areas where there are little, or sometimes no, existing data available to inform analysts about the likely potential of an opportunity or play segment. Analog-only techniques are called yet-to-find (YTF), and involve identifying areas containing producing assets that are geologically similar to those being estimated and substituting data to match what is known about a segment. (Note: the argument being “if it works in this part of the world, then why not here?”) The opportunity segment can be scaled to any level depending on the specific interest of the analyst, whether at a global, country, basin, structural domain, play, license or reservoir level. (Note: the larger the segment, the greater the degree of speculation) YTF is conceptual and is commonly used as a method for scoping potential in frontier areas where there is no oil or gas production or where new play concepts are being introduced with perceived potential. However, analog content can also be substituted for any subsurface parameters where there are gaps in data in more mature reserves or resource settings (below).

=== Volumetric method ===
Oil & gas volumes in a conventional reservoir can be calculated using a volume equation:

Recoverable volume = Gross Rock Volume (Note: GRV is defined as the volume of rock contained geometrically within conventional trap boundaries) * Net/Gross (Note: Net to Gross discounts non-reservoir portions of the GRV that has the lithological potential for being a productive zone) * Porosity (Note: Porosity is defined as the percentage of the net reservoir rock occupied by pores (typically 5-35% for a conventional reservoir)) * Oil or Gas Saturation (Note: hydrocarbon saturation (inversely measured as the water saturation Sw, where Sw is 1-hydrocarbon saturation) is defined as the percentage of pore space occupied by oil and/or gas) * Recovery Factor (Note: Recovery Factor (RF) is defined as the ratio between in-place and recoverable volumes) / Formation Volume Factor (Note: Oil shrinks and gas expands when brought to the surface. The FVF converts volumes at reservoir conditions (high pressure and high temperature) to storage and sale conditions, and is defined the volume of oil (and dissolved gas) at reservoir pressure and temperature required to produce one stock tank barrel of oil at the surface)

Deterministic volumes are calculated when single values are used as input parameters to this equation, which could include analog content. Probabilistic volumes are calculations when uncertainty distributions are applied as input to all or some of the terms of the equation (see also Copula (probability theory)), which preserve dependencies between parameters. These geostatistical methods are most commonly applied to prospective resources that still need to be tested by the drill bit. Contingent resources are also characterized by volumetric methods with analog content and uncertainty distributions before significant production has occurred, where spatial distribution information may be preserved in a static reservoir model. Static models and dynamic flow models can be populated with analog reservoir performance data to increase the confidence in forecasting as the amount and quality of static geoscientific and dynamic reservoir performance data increase.

=== Performance-based methods ===
Once production has commenced, production rates and pressure data allow a degree of prediction on reservoir performance, which was previously characterized by substituting analog data. Analog data can still be substituted for expected reservoir performance where specific dynamic data may be missing, representing a "best technical" outcome.

==== Reservoir simulation ====
Reservoir simulation is an area of reservoir engineering in which computer models are used to predict the flow of fluids (typically, oil, water, and gas) through porous media. The amount of oil & gas recoverable from a conventional reservoir is assessed by accurately characterising the static recoverable volumes and history matching that to dynamic flow. (Note: conventional reservoirs are characterised by buoyancy of oil, gas and water, estimated using Darcy flow in subsurface, which contrasts with unconventional reservoirs dominated by capillary forces) Reservoir performance is important because the recovery changes as the physical environment of the reservoir adjusts with every molecule extracted; the longer a reservoir has been flowing, the more accurate the prediction of remaining reserves. Dynamic simulations are commonly used by analysts to update reserves volumes, particularly in large complex reservoirs. Daily production can be matched against production forecasts to establish the accuracy of simulation models based on actual volumes of recovered oil or gas. Unlike analogs or volumetric methods above, the degree of confidence in the estimates (or the range of outcomes) increases as the amount and quality of geological, engineering and production performance data increase. These must then be compared with previous estimates, whether derived from analog, volumetric or static reservoir modelling before reserves can be adjusted and booked.

==== Materials balance method ====
The materials balance method for an oil or gas field uses an equation that relates the volume of oil, water and gas that has been produced from a reservoir and the change in reservoir pressure to calculate the remaining oil & gas. It assumes that, as fluids from the reservoir are produced, there will be a change in the reservoir pressure that depends on the remaining volume of oil & gas. The method requires extensive pressure-volume-temperature analysis and an accurate pressure history of the field. It requires some production to occur (typically 5% to 10% of ultimate recovery), unless reliable pressure history can be used from a field with similar rock and fluid characteristics.

==== Production decline curve method ====
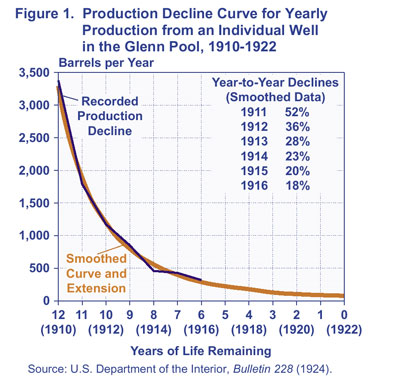
Example of a production decline curve for an individual well

The decline curve method is an extrapolation of known production data to fit a decline curve and estimate future oil & gas production. The three most common forms of decline curves are exponential, hyperbolic, and harmonic. It is assumed that the production will decline on a reasonably smooth curve, and so allowances must be made for wells shut in and production restrictions. The curve can be expressed mathematically or plotted on a graph to estimate future production. It has the advantage of (implicitly) conflating all reservoir characteristics. It requires a sufficient production history to establish a statistically significant trend, ideally when production is not curtailed by regulatory or other artificial conditions.

=== Reserves growth ===
Experience shows that initial estimates of the size of newly discovered oil & gas fields are usually too low. As years pass, successive estimates of the ultimate recovery of fields tend to increase. The term reserve growth refers to the typical increases (but narrowing range) of estimated ultimate recovery that occur as oil & gas fields are developed and produced. Many oil-producing nations do not reveal their reservoir engineering field data and instead provide unaudited claims for their oil reserves. The numbers disclosed by some national governments are suspected of being manipulated for political reasons. In order to achieve international goals for decarbonisation, the International Energy Agency said in 2021 that countries should no longer expand exploration or invest in projects to expand reserves to meet climate goals set by the Paris Agreement.

== Unconventional reservoirs ==
The categories and estimation techniques outlined in the PRMS above apply only to conventional reservoirs, where oil & gas accumulations are controlled by hydrodynamic interactions between the buoyancy of oil & gas in water versus capillary forces. Oil or gas in unconventional reservoirs are much more tightly bound to rock matrices in excess of capillary forces and therefore require different approaches to both extraction and resource estimation. Unconventional reservoirs or accumulations also require different means of identification and include coalbed methane (CBM), basin-centered gas (low permeability), low permeability tight gas (including shale gas) and tight oil (including shale oil), gas hydrates, natural bitumen (very high viscosity oil), and oil shale (kerogen) deposits. Ultra low permeability reservoirs exhibit a half slope on a log-plot of flow-rates against time believed to be caused by drainage from matrix surfaces into adjoining fractures. Such reservoirs are commonly believed to be regionally pervasive that may be interrupted by regulatory or ownership boundaries with the potential for large oil & gas volumes, which are very hard to verify. Non-unique flow characteristics in unconventional accumulations means that commercial viability depends on the technology applied to extraction. Extrapolations from a single control point, and thereby resource estimation, are dependent on nearby producing analogs with evidence of economic viability. Under these circumstances, pilot projects may be needed to define reserves. Any other resource estimates are likely to be analog-only derived YTF volumes, which are speculative.

== See also ==
- Copula (probability theory)
- Decline curve analysis
- Estimated ultimate recovery
- Extraction of petroleum
- Global strategic petroleum reserves
- List of acronyms in oil and gas exploration and production
- List of natural gas fields
- List of oil fields
- List of oilfield service companies
- Oil exploration
- Oil in place
- Peak oil
- Petroleum Industry
- Petroleum play
- Probability density function
- Stranded gas reserve
- Uncertainty

Energy and resources:

- Energy security
- List of countries by natural gas proven reserves
- List of countries by proven oil reserves
- Natural gas
- Proven reserves
- Resource curse
- World energy resources and consumption
