= Proven reserves =

Measure of fossil fuel energy reserves

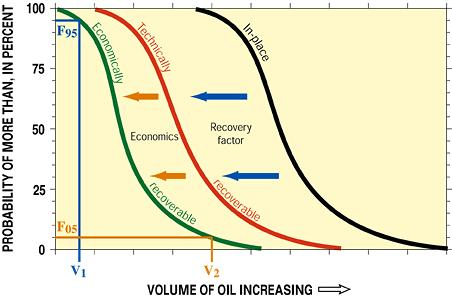
Proven reserves are a subset of producible reserves

Proven reserves (also called measured reserves, 1P, and reserves) is a measure of fossil fuel energy reserves, such as oil and gas reserves and coal reserves. It is defined as the "quantity of energy sources estimated with reasonable certainty, from the analysis of geologic and engineering data, to be recoverable from well established or known reservoirs with the existing equipment and under the existing operating conditions." A reserve is considered proven if it is probable that at least 90% of the resource is recoverable by economically profitable means.

Operating conditions are taken into account when determining if a reserve is classified as proven. Operating conditions include operational break-even price, regulatory and contractual approvals, without which the reserve cannot be classified as proven. Price changes therefore can have a large impact on the classification of proven reserves. Regulatory and contractual conditions may change, and also affect the amount of proven reserves. If a reserve's resources can be recovered using current technology but is not economically profitable it is considered "technically recoverable" but cannot be considered a proven reserve. Reserves less than 90% recoverable but more than 50% are considered "probable reserves" and below 50% are "possible reserves".

== Numbered terms ==
The engineering term P90 refers to 90 percent engineering probability, is a commonly accepted specific definition by Society of Petroleum Engineers, it does not take into account anything except technical concerns. Therefore, it is different from the business term which does take into account current break-even profitability, and regulatory and contractual approval, but is considered a very rough equivalent. The definition is certainly not universal. Energy Watch Group uses a different definition, P95.

== More terms ==
Disregarding economics, the proper engineering term for the total technologically extractable amount is the Producible fraction, which is easily confused with the business term proven reserves. However, the purely engineering term is also misleading in that squeezing the last bits of fossil fuel out follows the diminishing returns and at some point is so costly that it becomes highly impractical, as seen on a bell curve, which is why measures like P90 and P95 were created. The term proven reserves is further subdivided into proved developed reserves and proved undeveloped reserves. Note that it does not include unproven reserves, which is broken down into probable reserves and possible reserves.

These reserve categories are totaled up by the measures 1P, 2P, and 3P, which are inclusive of all reserves types:

- "1P reserves" = proven reserves (both proved developed reserves + proved undeveloped reserves).
- "2P reserves" = 1P (proven reserves) + probable reserves, hence "proved AND probable."
- "3P reserves" = the sum of 2P (proven reserves + probable reserves) + possible reserves, all 3Ps "proven AND probable AND possible."

New proven reserves are commonly added by new field discoveries. Reserves growth also commonly occurs in previously existing fields, as the characteristics of the reservoir become better understood, as fields are extended laterally, or new oil and gas reservoirs are found in existing fields. Reserve growth may also take place due to technological and economic changes.

=== Russian reserve categories ===
In Russia, reserves categories A, B, and C correspond roughly to developed producing reserves, undeveloped reserves with approved development, and discovered resources without a firm plan to develop yet. The designation ABC corresponds to estimated recoverable reserves.

=== Qatari reserve categories ===
With the publication of the 2020 corporate bond prospectus Qatar Energy introduced the term Confirmed Reserves for its North Field gas reserves. Although Qatar Energy has failed to produce a definition of the term it is known to be roughly equivalent to what the rest of the industry would call prospective resources and hence a mis use of the term reserves. Khalid Al-Rumaihi, the vice president of subsurface development and a staunch advocate of rigid reserves accounting, announced his surprise early retirement shortly before the bond prospectus was released.

== Reserve evaluations, valuations and certifications ==
Oil companies employ specialist, independent, reserve valuation consultants - such as Gaffney, Cline & Associates, Sproule, Miller and Lents, Ltd., DeGolyer and MacNaughton, Ryder Scott, Netherland, Sewell & Associates Inc. (NSAI), Lloyd's Register (LR), Evolution Resources, Cawley, Gillespie & Associates Inc. (CG&A) and others - to provide third party reports as part of Securities and Exchange Commission (SEC) SEC filings and SPE Petroleum Resources Management System (PRMS) for other Stockmarket listings. On December 30, 2009, recognising advances in exploration and valuation technology, the SEC allowed 2P probable and 3P possible reserves to be reported, along with 1P proved reserves, though oil companies also have to verify the independence of third party consultants. Since investors view 1P reserves with much greater importance than 2P or 3P reserves, oil companies seek to convert 2P and 3P reserves into 1P reserves.

== See also ==
- Estimated ultimate recovery
- List of countries by proven oil reserves
- Oil and gas reserves
- List of countries by coal reserves
