= Peake (surname) =

Peake is a surname, and may refer to:

- Archibald Peake (1859–1920), Australian conservative politician and Premier of South Australia
- Arthur Peake (1865–1929), British biblical scholar
- Brett Peake (born 1983), Australian rules footballer
- Sir Charles Peake (1897–1958), British ambassador
- Edward Peake (1860–1945), English cricketer who played international rugby for Wales
- Dame Felicity Peake (1913–2002), founding director of the Women's Royal Air Force
- Frederick Peake (1886–1970), British Army and police officer and creator of the Arab Legion
- Sir Henry Peake (1753–1825) co-Surveyor of the Royal Navy
- James Peake (born 1944), 6th United States Secretary of Veterans Affairs
- Jason Peake (born 1971), English footballer
- John Peake, multiple people

- John Peake (field hockey) (born 1924), English field hockey player
- John Peake (game designer), British board game maker

- Karolína Peake (born 1975), Czech politician
- Mary S. Peake (1823–1862), American teacher and humanitarian
- Maxine Peake (born 1974), British actress
- Mervyn Peake (1911–1968), British fantasy writer and artist
- Osbert Peake, 1st Viscount Ingleby (1897–1966), British politician
- Pat Peake (born 1973), American ice hockey player
- Richard Brinsley Peake (1792–1847), English dramatist
- Robert Peake the elder (c. 1551–1619), English painter
- Sir Robert Peake (c. 1592–1667), English print-seller and royalist
- Ryan Peake (born 1975), Canadian guitarist with Nickelback
- Tessa Peake-Jones (born 1957), British actress
- Timothy Peake (born 1972), British astronaut
- William Peake (c. 1580–1639), English painter and printseller

== See also ==
- Peak (disambiguation)
- Peek § People with the surname
