= Camera =

Optical device for recording images

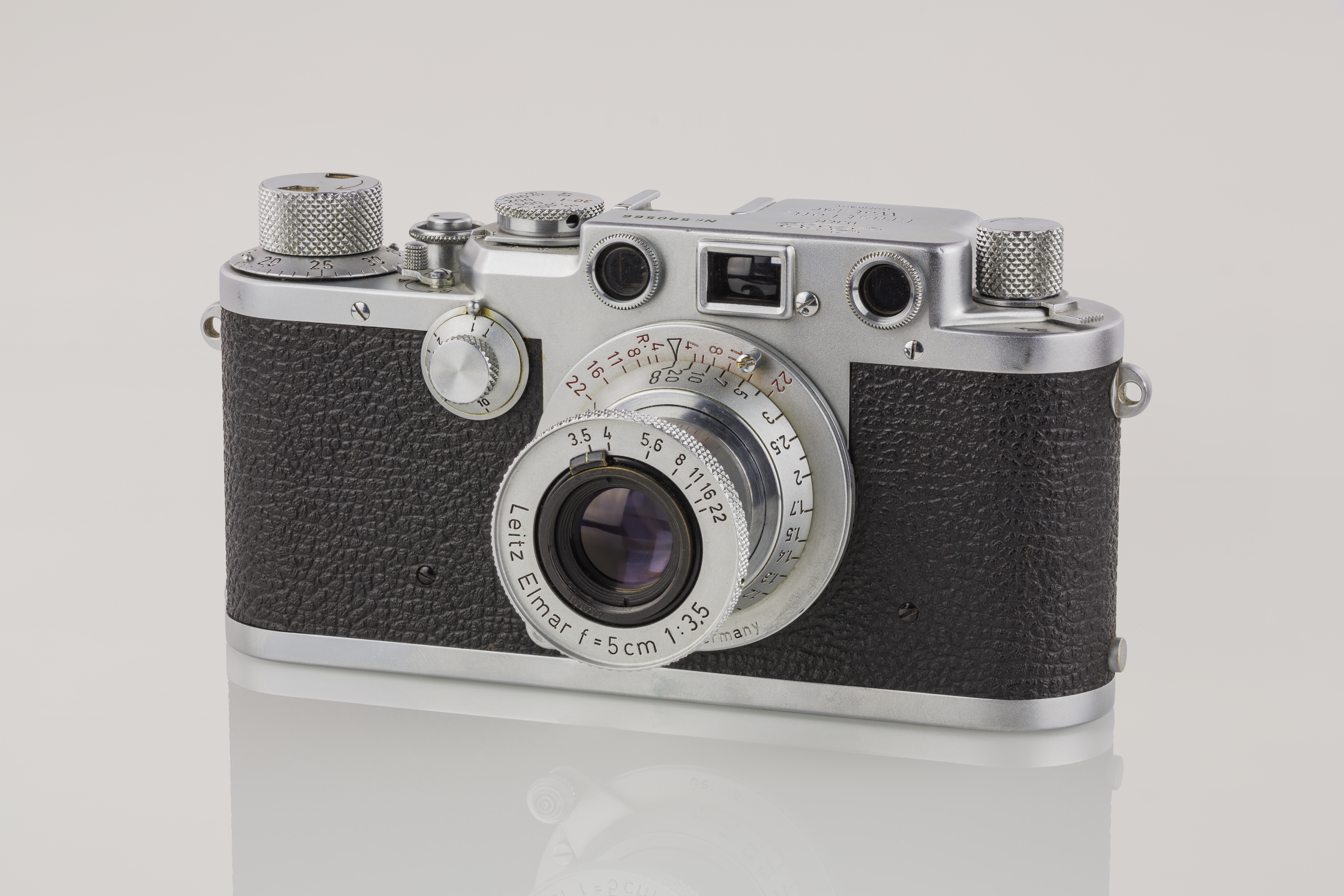
Leica camera (1950s)

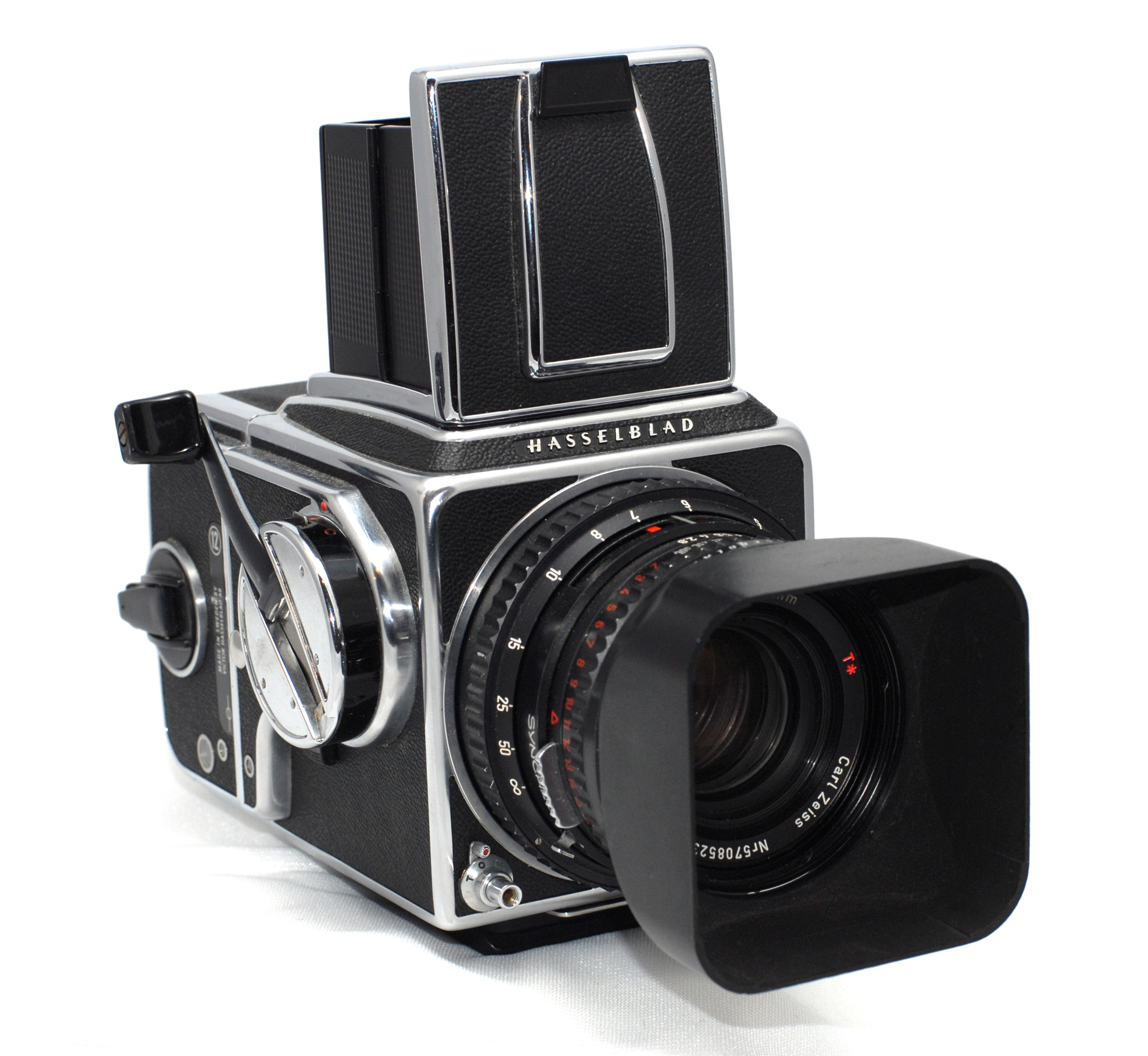
Hasselblad 500 C/M with Zeiss lens

A camera is an instrument used to capture and store images and videos, either digitally via an electronic image sensor, or chemically via a light-sensitive material such as photographic film. As a pivotal technology in the fields of photography and videography, cameras have played a significant role in the progression of visual arts, media, entertainment, surveillance, and scientific research. The invention of the camera dates back to the 19th century and has since evolved with advancements in technology, leading to a vast array of types and models in the 21st century.

Cameras function through a combination of multiple mechanical components and principles. These include exposure control, which regulates the amount of light reaching the sensor or film; the lens, which focuses the light; the viewfinder, which allows the user to preview the scene; and the film or sensor, which captures the image.

Several types of camera exist, each suited to specific uses and offering unique capabilities. Single-lens reflex (SLR) cameras provide real-time, exact imaging through the lens. Large-format and medium-format cameras offer higher image resolution and are often used in professional and artistic photography. Compact cameras, known for their portability and simplicity, are popular in consumer photography. Rangefinder cameras, with separate viewing and imaging systems, were historically widely used in photojournalism. Motion picture cameras are specialized for filming cinematic content, while digital cameras, which became prevalent in the late 20th and early 21st century, use electronic sensors to capture and store images.

The rapid development of smartphone camera technology in the 21st century has blurred the lines between dedicated cameras and multifunctional devices, as the smartphone camera is easier to use, profoundly influencing how society creates, shares, and consumes visual content.

== History ==
=== 19th century ===
Beginning with the use of the camera obscura and transitioning to complex photographic cameras, the evolution of the technology in the 19th century was driven by pioneers like Thomas Wedgwood, Nicéphore Niépce, and Henry Fox Talbot. First using the camera obscura for chemical experiments, they ultimately created cameras specifically for chemical photography, and later reduced the camera's size and optimized lens configurations.

The introduction of the daguerreotype process in 1839 facilitated commercial camera manufacturing, with various producers contributing diverse designs. As camera manufacturing became a specialized trade in the 1850s, designs and sizes were standardized.

The latter half of the century witnessed the advent of dry plates and roll-film, prompting a shift towards smaller and more cost-effective cameras, epitomized by the original Kodak camera, first produced in 1888. This period also saw significant advancements in lens technology and the emergence of color photography, leading to a surge in camera ownership.

=== 20th century ===
The first half of the 20th century saw continued miniaturization and the integration of new manufacturing materials. After World War I, Germany took the lead in camera development, spearheading industry consolidation and producing precision-made cameras. The industry saw significant product launches such as the Leica camera and the Contax, which were enabled by advancements in film and lens designs. Additionally, there was a marked increase in accessibility to cinematography for amateurs with Eastman Kodak's production of the first 16-mm and 8-mm reversal safety films. The World War II era saw a focus on the development of specialized aerial reconnaissance and instrument-recording equipment, even as the overall pace of non-military camera innovation slowed.

In the second half of the century, Japanese manufacturers in particular advanced camera technology. From the introduction of the affordable Ricohflex III TLR in 1952 to the first 35mm SLR with automatic exposure, the Olympus AutoEye in 1960, new designs and features continuously emerged. Electronics became integral to camera design in the 1970s, evident in models like Polaroid's SX-70 and Canon's AE-1.

Transition to digital photography marked the late 20th century, culminating in digital camera sales surpassing film cameras in the United States by 2003. In contrast, the film camera industry in the UK, Western Europe, and the USA declined during this period, while manufacturing continued in the USSR, German Democratic Republic, and China, often mimicking Western designs.

=== 21st century ===
The 21st century witnessed the mass adoption of digital cameras and significant improvements in sensor technology. A major revolution came with the incorporation of cameras into smartphones, making photography a commonplace activity. The century also marked the rise of computational photography, using algorithms and AI to enhance image quality. Features like low-light and HDR photography, optical image stabilization, and depth-sensing became common in smartphone cameras.

== Mechanics ==
Basic elements of a modern digital single-lens reflex (DSLR) still camera.

Most cameras capture light from the visible light spectrum, while specialized cameras capture other portions of the electromagnetic spectrum, such as infrared.

All cameras use the same basic design: light enters an enclosed box through a converging or convex lens and an image is recorded on a light-sensitive medium. A shutter mechanism controls the length of time that light enters the camera.

Most cameras also have a viewfinder, which shows the scene to be recorded, along with means to adjust various combinations of focus, aperture and shutter speed.

=== Exposure control ===
==== Aperture ====
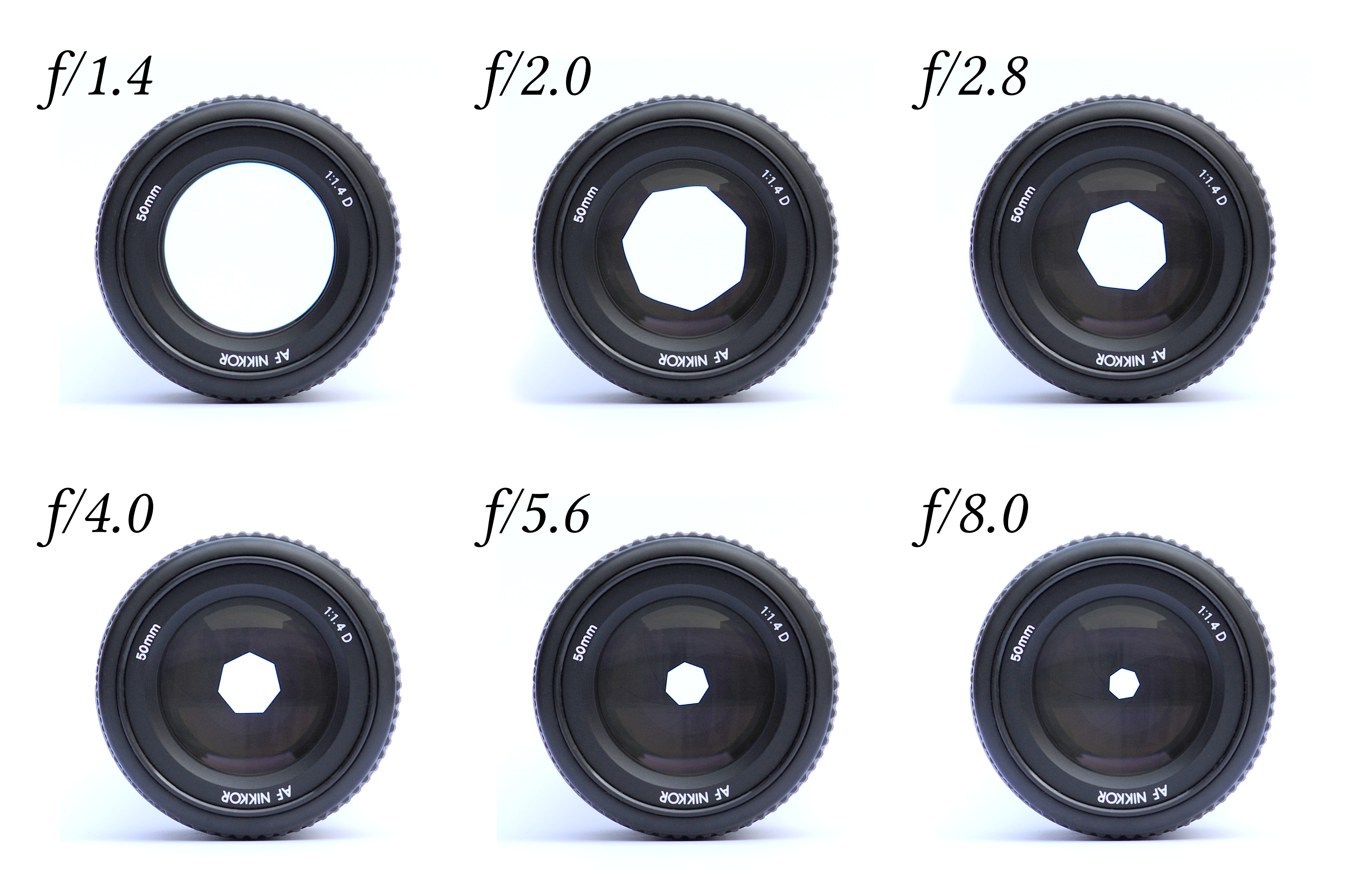
Different apertures of a lens.

Light enters the camera through an aperture, an opening adjusted by overlapping plates called the aperture ring. Typically located in the lens, this opening can be widened or narrowed to alter the amount of light that strikes the film or sensor. The size of the aperture can be set manually, by rotating the lens or adjusting a dial or automatically based on readings from an internal light meter.

As the aperture is adjusted, the opening expands and contracts in increments called f-stops. (Note: These f-stops are also referred to as f-numbers, stop numbers, steps or stops. The f-number is the focal length of the lens divided by the diameter of the effective aperture.) The smaller the f-stop, the more light is allowed to enter the lens, increasing the exposure. Typically, f-stops range from f/1.4 to f/32 (Note: Theoretically, they can extend to f/64 or higher.) in standard increments: 1.4, 2, 2.8, 4, 5.6, 8, 11, 16, 22, and 32. The light entering the camera is halved with each increasing increment.

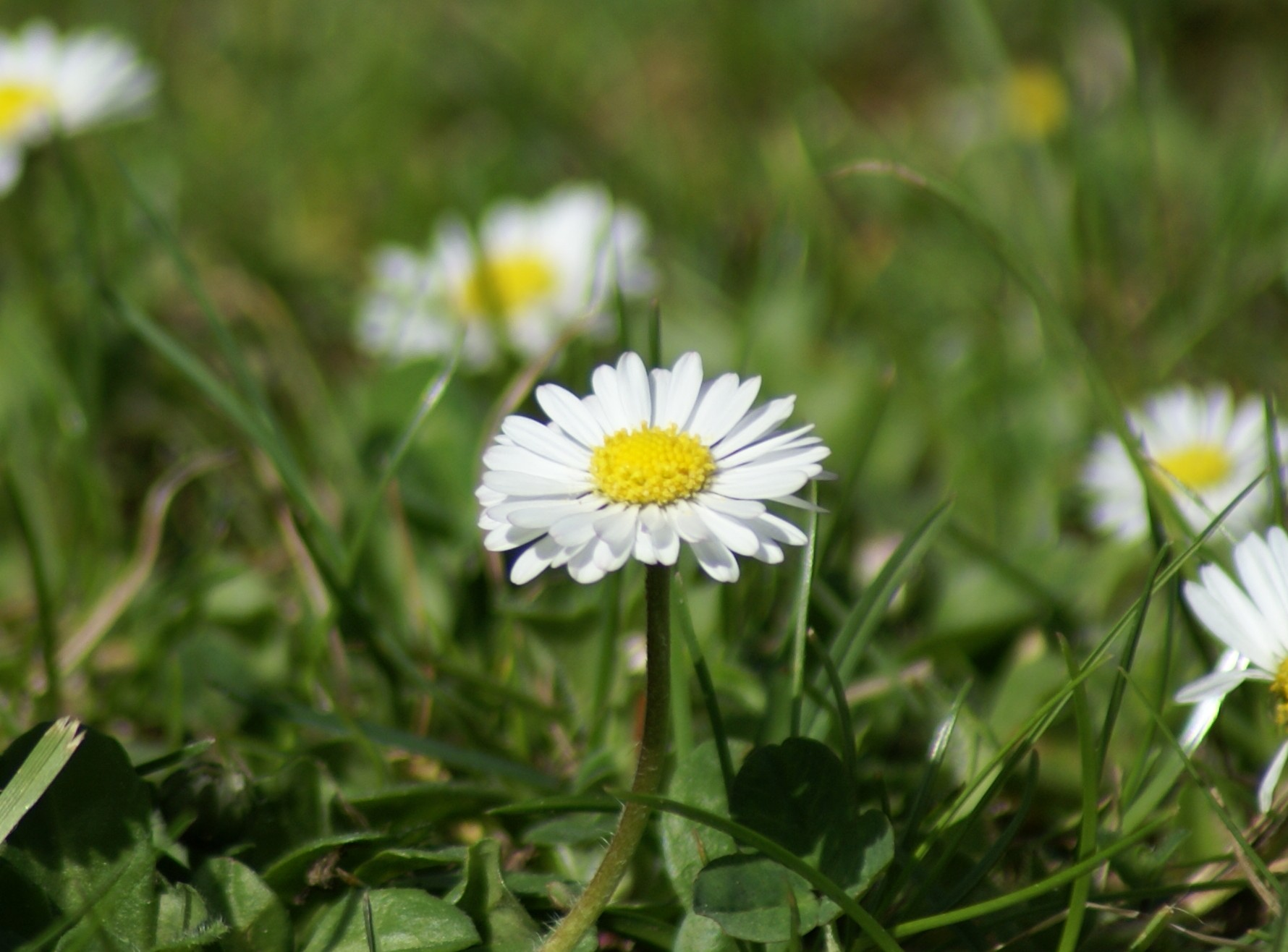
The distance range in which objects appear clear and sharp, called depth of field, can be adjusted by many cameras. This allows a photographer to control which objects appear in focus, and which do not.

The wider opening at lower f-stops narrows the range of focus so the background is blurry while the foreground is in focus. This depth of field increases as the aperture closes. A narrow aperture results in a high depth of field, meaning that objects at many different distances from the camera will appear to be in focus. What is acceptably in focus is determined by the circle of confusion, the photographic technique, the equipment in use and the degree of magnification expected of the final image.

==== Shutter ====
The shutter, along with the aperture, is one of two ways to control the amount of light entering the camera. The shutter determines the duration that the light-sensitive surface is exposed to light. The shutter opens, light enters the camera and exposes the film or sensor to light, and then the shutter closes.

There are two types of mechanical shutters: the leaf-type shutter and the focal-plane shutter. The leaf-type uses a circular iris diaphragm maintained under spring tension inside or just behind the lens that rapidly opens and closes when the shutter is released.

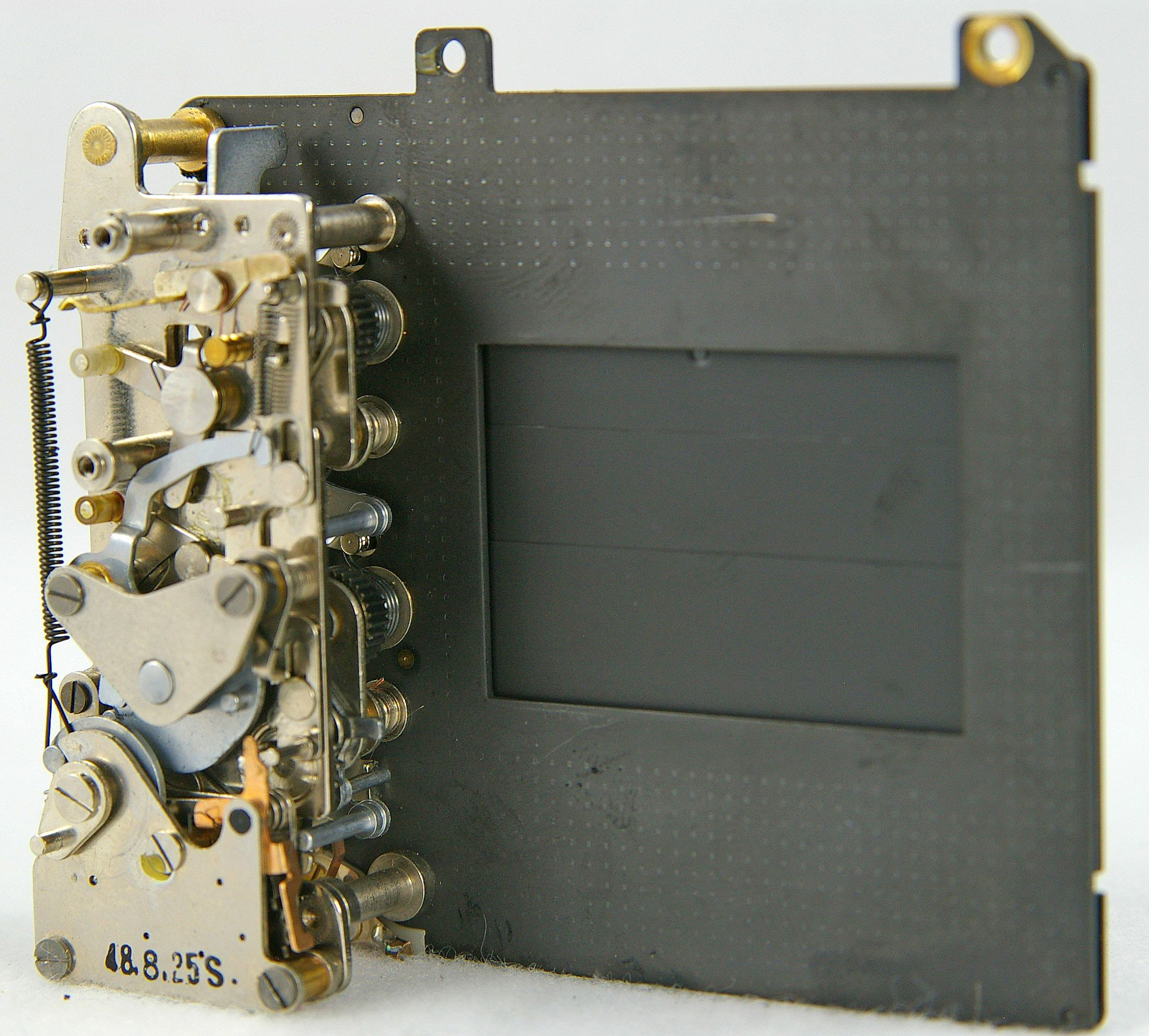
A focal-plane shutter. In this shutter, the metal shutter blades travel vertically.

More commonly, a focal-plane shutter is used. This shutter operates close to the film plane and employs metal plates or cloth curtains with an opening that passes across the light-sensitive surface. The curtains or plates have an opening that is pulled across the film plane during exposure. The focal-plane shutter is typically used in single-lens reflex (SLR) cameras, since covering the film (rather than blocking the light passing through the lens) allows the photographer to view the image through the lens at all times, except during the exposure itself. Covering the film also facilitates removing the lens from a loaded camera, as many SLRs have interchangeable lenses.

A digital camera may use a mechanical or electronic shutter, the latter of which is common in smartphone cameras. Electronic shutters either record data from the entire sensor simultaneously (a global shutter) or record the data line by line across the sensor (a rolling shutter). In movie cameras, a rotary shutter opens and closes in sync with the advancement of each frame of film.

The duration for which the shutter is open is called the shutter speed or exposure time. Typical exposure times can range from one second to 1/1,000 of a second, though longer and shorter durations are not uncommon. In the early stages of photography, exposures were often several minutes long. These long exposure times often resulted in blurry images, as a single object is recorded in multiple places across a single image for the duration of the exposure. To prevent this, shorter exposure times can be used. Very short exposure times can capture fast-moving action and eliminate motion blur. However, shorter exposure times require more light to produce a properly exposed image, so shortening the exposure time is not always possible.

Like aperture settings, exposure times increment in powers of two. The two settings determine the exposure value (EV), a measure of how much light is recorded during the exposure. There is a direct relationship between the exposure times and aperture settings so that if the exposure time is lengthened one step, but the aperture opening is also narrowed one step, then the amount of light that contacts the film or sensor is the same.

==== Light meter ====
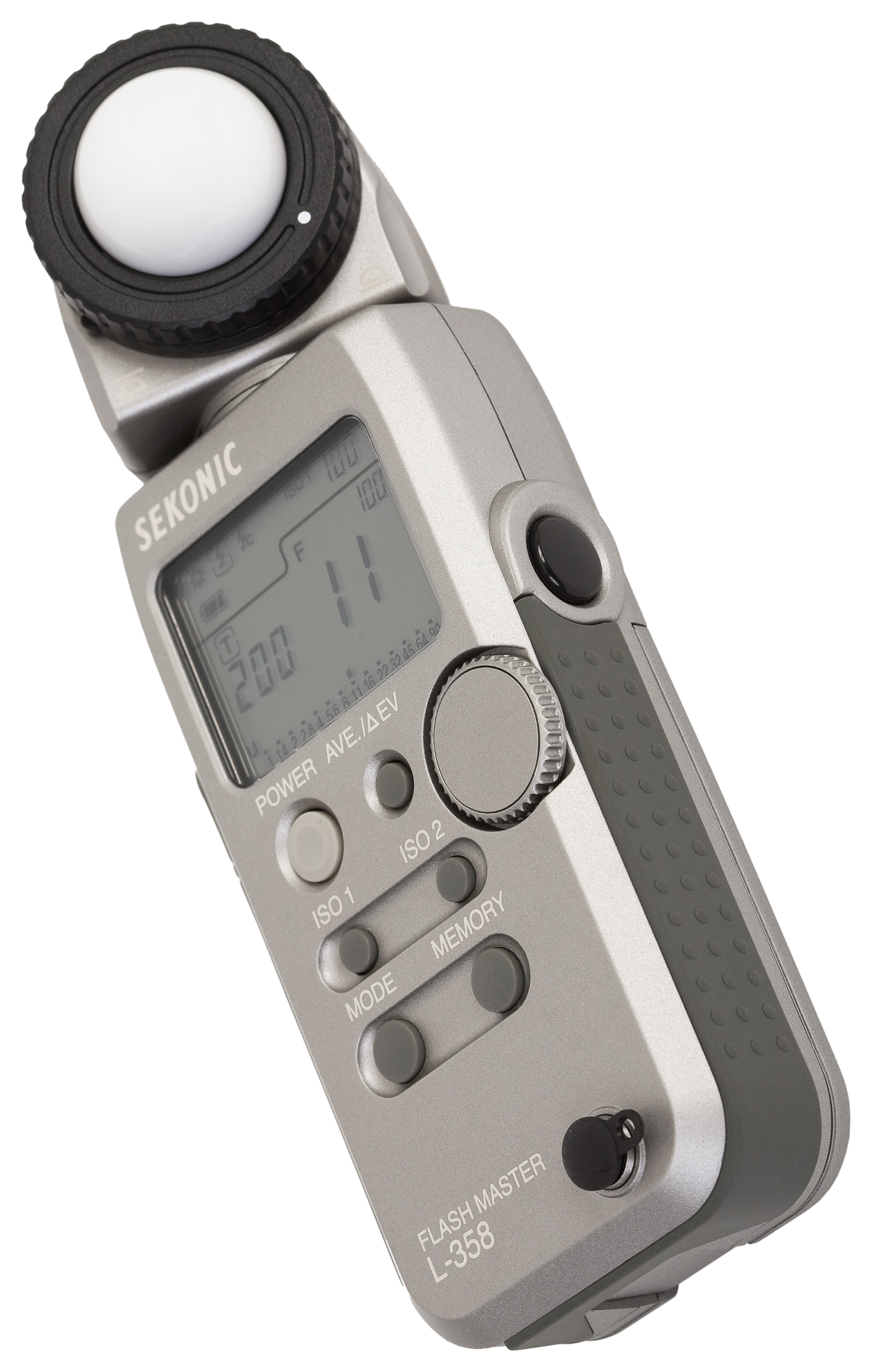
A handheld digital light meter showing an exposure of 1/200th at an aperture of f/11, at ISO 100. The light sensor is on top, under the white diffusing hemisphere.

In most modern cameras, the amount of light entering the camera is measured using a built-in light meter or exposure meter. (Note: Some photographers use handheld exposure meters independent of the camera and use the readings to manually set the exposure settings on the camera.) Taken through the lens (called TTL metering), these readings are taken using a panel of light-sensitive semiconductors. They are used to calculate optimal exposure settings. These settings are typically determined automatically as the reading is used by the camera's microprocessor. The reading from the light meter is incorporated with aperture settings, exposure times, and film or sensor sensitivity to calculate the optimal exposure. (Note: Film canisters typically contain a DX code that can be read by modern cameras so that the camera's computer knows the sensitivity of the film, the ISO.])

Light meters typically average the light in a scene to 18% middle gray. More advanced cameras are more nuanced in their metering—weighing the center of the frame more heavily (center-weighted metering), considering the differences in light across the image (matrix metering), or allowing the photographer to take a light reading at a specific point within the image (spot metering).

=== Lens ===
A camera lens is an assembly of multiple optical elements, typically made from high-quality glass. Its primary function is to focus light onto a camera's film or digital sensor, thereby producing an image. This process significantly influences image quality, the overall appearance of the photo, and which parts of the scene are brought into focus.

A camera lens is constructed from a series of lens elements, small pieces of glass arranged to form an image accurately on the light-sensitive surface. Each element is designed to reduce optical aberrations, or distortions, such as chromatic aberration (a failure of the lens to focus all colors at the same point), vignetting (darkening of image corners), and distortion (bending or warping of the image). The degree of these distortions can vary depending on the subject of the photo.

The focal length of the lens, measured in millimeters, plays a critical role as it determines how much of the scene the camera can capture and how large the objects appear. Wide-angle lenses provide a broad view of the scene, while telephoto lenses capture a narrower view but magnify the objects. The focal length also influences the ease of taking clear pictures handheld, with longer lengths making it more challenging to avoid blur from small camera movements.

Two primary types of lenses include zoom and prime lenses. A zoom lens allows for changing its focal length within a certain range, providing the convenience of adjusting the scene capture without moving the camera or changing the lens. A prime lens, in contrast, has a fixed focal length. While less flexible, prime lenses often provide superior image quality, are typically lighter, and perform better in low light.

Focus involves adjusting the lens elements to sharpen the image of the subject at various distances. The focus is adjusted through the focus ring on the lens, which moves the lens elements closer or further from the sensor. Autofocus is a feature included in many lenses, which uses a motor within the lens to adjust the focus quickly and precisely based on the lens's detection of contrast or phase differences. This feature can be enabled or disabled using switches on the lens body.

Advanced lenses may include mechanical image stabilization systems that move lens elements or the image sensor itself to counteract camera shake, especially beneficial in low-light conditions or at slow shutter speeds. Lens hoods, filters, and caps are accessories used alongside a lens to enhance image quality, protect the lens, or achieve specific effects.

=== Viewfinder ===
The camera's viewfinder provides a real-time approximation of what will be captured by the sensor or film. It assists photographers in aligning, focusing, and adjusting the composition, lighting, and exposure of their shots, enhancing the accuracy of the final image.

Viewfinders fall into two primary categories: optical and electronic. Optical viewfinders, commonly found in Single-Lens Reflex (SLR) cameras, use a system of mirrors or prisms to reflect light from the lens to the viewfinder, providing a clear, real-time view of the scene. Electronic viewfinders, typical in mirrorless cameras, project an electronic image onto a small display, offering a wider range of information such as live exposure previews and histograms, albeit at the cost of potential lag and higher battery consumption. Specialized viewfinder systems exist for specific applications, like subminiature cameras for spying or underwater photography.

Parallax error, resulting from misalignment between the viewfinder and lens axes, can cause inaccurate representations of the subject's position. While negligible with distant subjects, this error becomes prominent with closer ones. Some viewfinders incorporate parallax-compensating devices to mitigate that issue.

=== Film and sensor ===
Image capture in a camera occurs when light strikes a light-sensitive surface: photographic film or a digital sensor. Housed within the camera body, the film or sensor records the light's pattern when the shutter is briefly opened to allow light to pass during the exposure.

==== Film camera ====
Loading film into a film camera is a manual process. The film, typically housed in a cartridge, is loaded into a designated slot in the camera. One end of the film strip, the film leader, is manually threaded onto a take-up spool. Once the back of the camera is closed, the film advance lever or knob is used to ensure the film is correctly placed. The photographer then winds the film, either manually or automatically depending on the camera, to position a blank portion of the film in the path of the light. Each time a photo is taken, the film advance mechanism moves the exposed film out of the way, bringing a new, unexposed section of film into position for the next shot.

The film must be advanced after each shot to prevent double exposure — where the same section of film is exposed to light twice, resulting in overlapped images. Once all frames on the film roll have been exposed, the film is rewound back into the cartridge, ready to be removed from the camera for developing.

==== Digital camera ====
In digital cameras, sensors typically comprise Charge-Coupled Devices (CCDs) or Complementary Metal-Oxide-Semiconductor (CMOS) chips, both of which convert incoming light into electrical charges to form digital images. CCD sensors, though power-intensive, are recognized for their excellent light sensitivity and image quality. Conversely, CMOS sensors offer individual pixel readouts, leading to less power consumption and faster frame rates, with their image quality having improved significantly over time.

Digital cameras convert light into electronic data that can be directly processed and stored. The volume of data generated is dictated by the sensor's size and properties, necessitating storage media such as Compact Flash, Memory Sticks, and SD (Secure Digital) cards. Modern digital cameras typically feature a built-in monitor for immediate image review and adjustments. Digital images are also more readily handled and manipulated by computers, offering a significant advantage in terms of flexibility and post-processing potential over traditional film.

=== Camera accessories ===
==== Flash ====
A flash provides a short burst of bright light during exposure and is a commonly used artificial light source in photography. Most modern flash systems use a battery-powered high-voltage discharge through a gas-filled tube to generate bright light for a very short time (1/1,000 of a second or less). (Note: The older type of disposable flashbulb uses an aluminum or zirconium wire in a glass tube filled with oxygen. During the exposure, the wire is burned away, producing a bright flash.)

Many flash units measure the light reflected from the flash to help determine the appropriate duration of the flash. When the flash is attached directly to the camera—typically in a slot at the top of the camera (the flash shoe or hot shoe) or through a cable—activating the shutter on the camera triggers the flash, and the camera's internal light meter can help determine the duration of the flash.

Additional flash equipment can include a light diffuser, mount and stand, reflector, soft box, trigger and cord.

==== Other accessories ====
Accessories for cameras are mainly used for care, protection, special effects, and functions.

- Lens hood: used on the end of a lens to block the sun or other light source to prevent glare and lens flare (see also matte box).
- Lens cap: covers and protects the camera lens when not in use.
- Lens adapter: allows the use of lenses other than those for which the camera was designed.
- Filter: allows artificial colors or changes light density.
- Lens extension tube: allows close focus in macro photography.
- Care and protection: including camera case and cover, maintenance tools, and screen protector.
- Camera monitor: provides an off-camera view of the composition with a brighter and more colorful screen, and typically exposes more advanced tools such as framing guides, focus peaking, zebra stripes, waveform monitors (oftentimes as an "RGB parade"), vectorscopes and false color to highlight areas of the image critical to the photographer.
- Tripod: primarily used for keeping the camera steady while recording video, doing a long exposure, and time-lapse photography.
- Microscope adapter: used to connect a camera to a microscope to photograph what the microscope is examining.
- Cable release: used to remotely control the shutter using a remote shutter button that can be connected to the camera via a cable. It can be used to lock the shutter open for the desired period, and it is also commonly used to prevent the camera shake from pressing the built-in camera shutter button.
- Dew shield: prevents moisture build-up on the lens.
- UV filter: can protect the front element of a lens from scratches, cracks, smudges, dirt, dust, and moisture while keeping a minimum impact on image quality.
- Battery and sometimes a charger.

Large format cameras use special equipment that includes a magnifier loupe, view finder, angle finder, and focusing rail/truck. Some professional SLRs can be provided with interchangeable finders for eye-level or waist-level focusing, focusing screens, eyecup, data backs, motor-drives for film transportation or external battery packs.

== Primary types ==
=== Single-lens reflex (SLR) camera ===
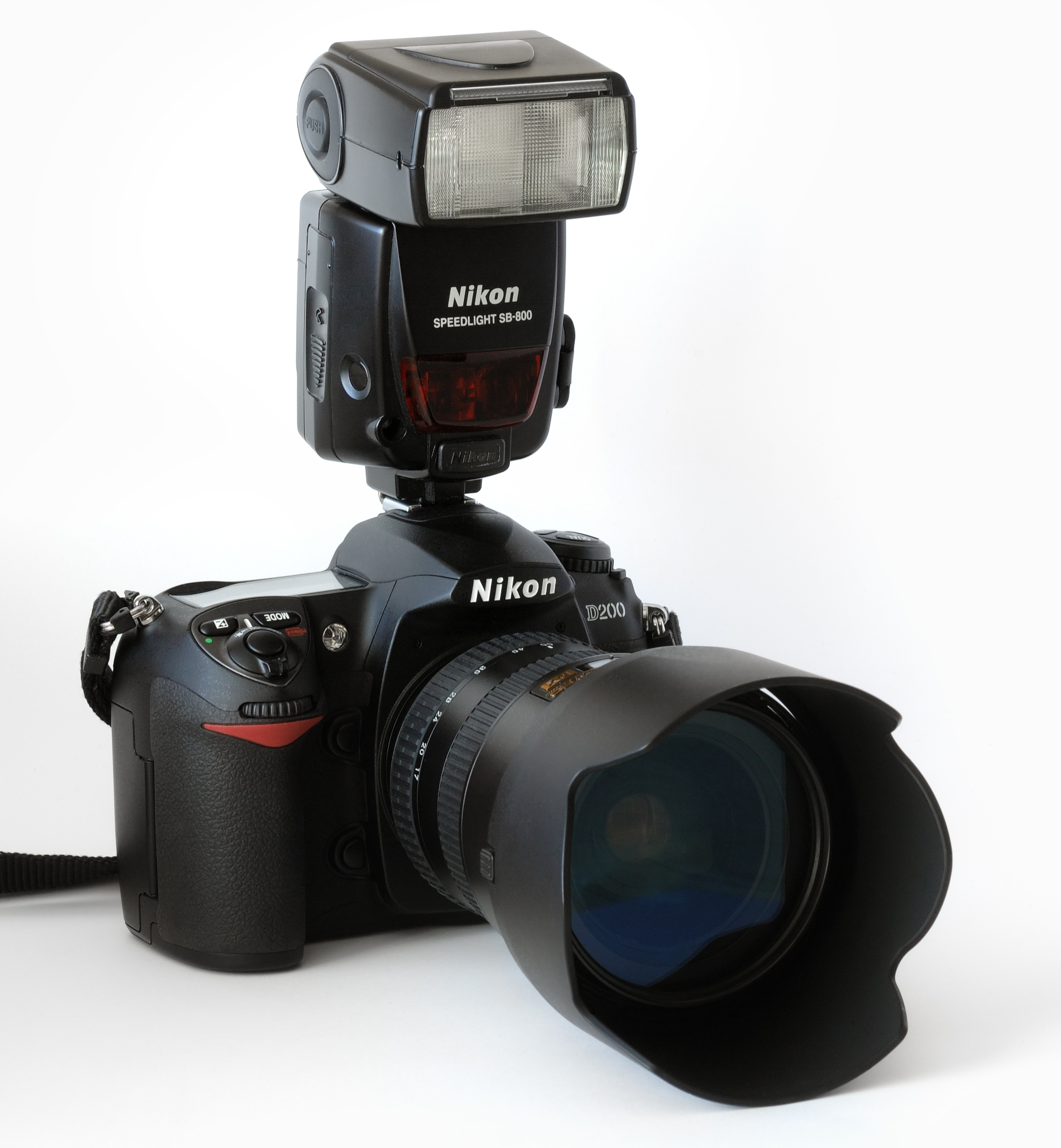
Nikon D200 digital camera with mounted flash

In photography, the single-lens reflex camera (SLR) is provided with a mirror to redirect light from the lens to the viewfinder prior to releasing the shutter for composing and focusing an image. When the shutter is released, the mirror swings up and away, allowing the exposure of the photographic medium, and instantly returns after the exposure is finished. No SLR camera before 1954 had this feature, although the mirror on some early SLR cameras was entirely operated by the force exerted on the shutter release and only returned when the finger pressure was released. The Asahiflex II, released by Japanese company Asahi (Pentax) in 1954, was the world's first SLR camera with an instant return mirror.

In the single-lens reflex camera, the photographer sees the scene through the camera lens. This avoids the problem of parallax which occurs when the viewfinder or viewing lens is separated from the taking lens. Single-lens reflex cameras have been made in several formats including sheet film 5x7" and 4x5", roll film 220/120 taking 8,10, 12, or 16 photographs on a 120 roll, and twice that number of a 220 film. These correspond to 6x9, 6x7, 6x6, and 6x4.5 respectively (all dimensions in cm). Notable manufacturers of large format and roll film SLR cameras include Bronica, Graflex, Hasselblad, Seagull, Mamiya and Pentax. However, the most common format of SLR cameras has been 35 mm and subsequently the migration to digital SLR cameras, using almost identical sized bodies and sometimes using the same lens systems.

Almost all SLR cameras use a front-surfaced mirror in the optical path to direct the light from the lens via a viewing screen and pentaprism to the eyepiece. At the time of exposure, the mirror is flipped up out of the light path before the shutter opens. Some early cameras experimented with other methods of providing through-the-lens viewing, including the use of a semi-transparent pellicle as in the Canon Pellix and others with a small periscope such as in the Corfield Periflex series.

=== Large-format camera ===
The large-format camera, taking sheet film, is a direct successor of the early plate cameras and remained in use for high-quality photography and technical, architectural, and industrial photography. There are three common types: the view camera, with its monorail and field camera variants, and the press camera. They have extensible bellows with the lens and shutter mounted on a lens plate at the front. Backs taking roll film and later digital backs are available in addition to the standard dark slide back. These cameras have a wide range of movements allowing very close control of focus and perspective. Composition and focusing are done on view cameras by viewing a ground-glass screen which is replaced by the film to make the exposure; they are suitable for static subjects only and are slow to use.

==== Plate camera ====
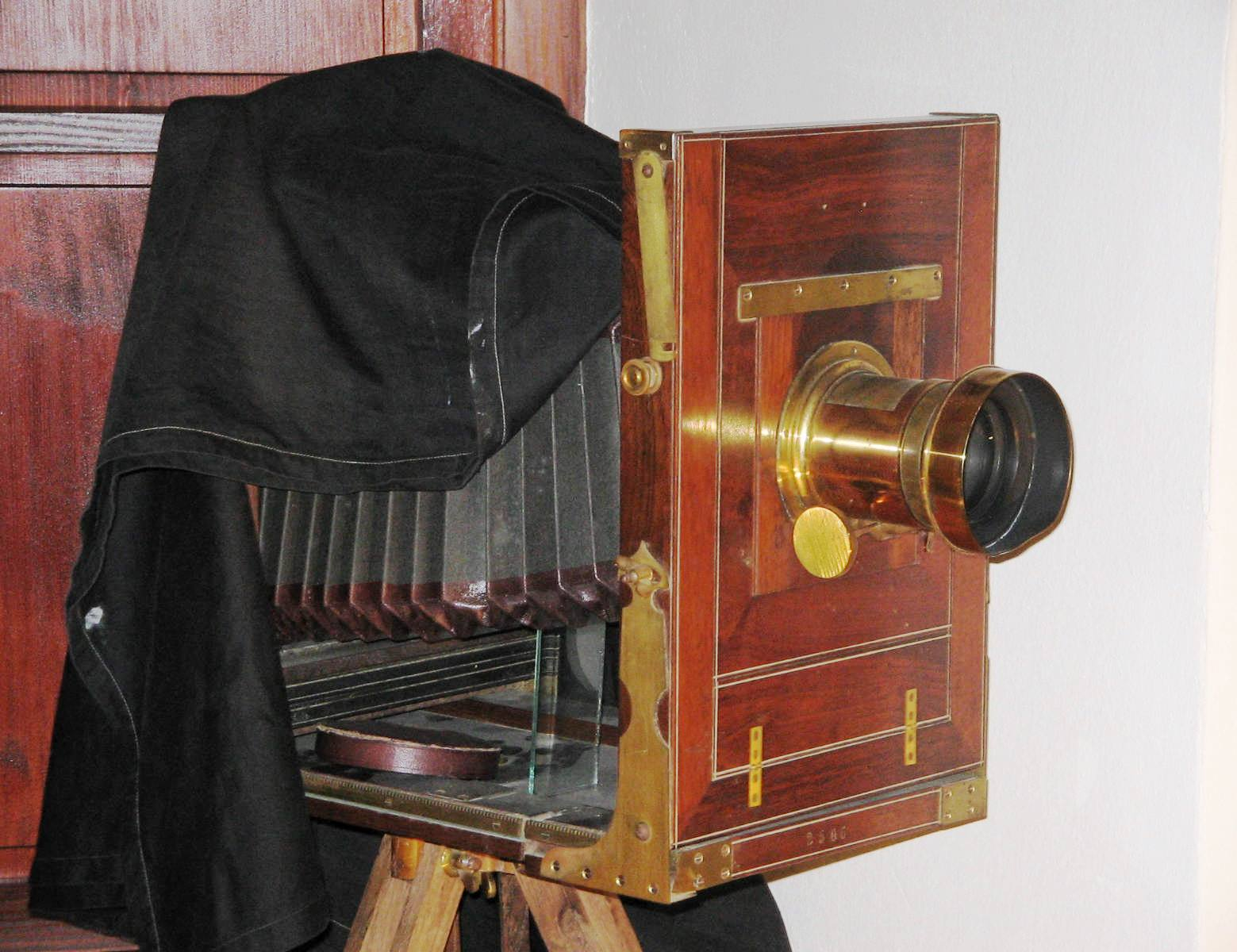
19th-century studio camera with bellows for focusing

The earliest cameras produced in significant numbers were plate cameras, using sensitized glass plates. Light entered a lens mounted on a lens board which was separated from the plate by extendible bellows. There were simple box cameras for glass plates but also single-lens reflex cameras with interchangeable lenses and even for color photography (Autochrome Lumière). Many of these cameras had controls to raise, lower, and tilt the lens forwards or backward to control perspective.

Focusing of these plate cameras was by the use of a ground glass screen at the point of focus. Because lens design only allowed rather small aperture lenses, the image on the ground glass screen was faint and most photographers had a dark cloth to cover their heads to allow focusing and composition to be carried out more quickly. When focus and composition were satisfactory, the ground glass screen was removed, and a sensitized plate was put in its place protected by a dark slide. To make the exposure, the dark decline was carefully slid out and the shutter opened, and then closed and the dark fall replaced.

Glass plates were later replaced by sheet film in a dark slide for sheet film; adapter sleeves were made to allow sheet film to be used in plate holders. In addition to the ground glass, a simple optical viewfinder was often fitted.

=== Medium-format camera ===
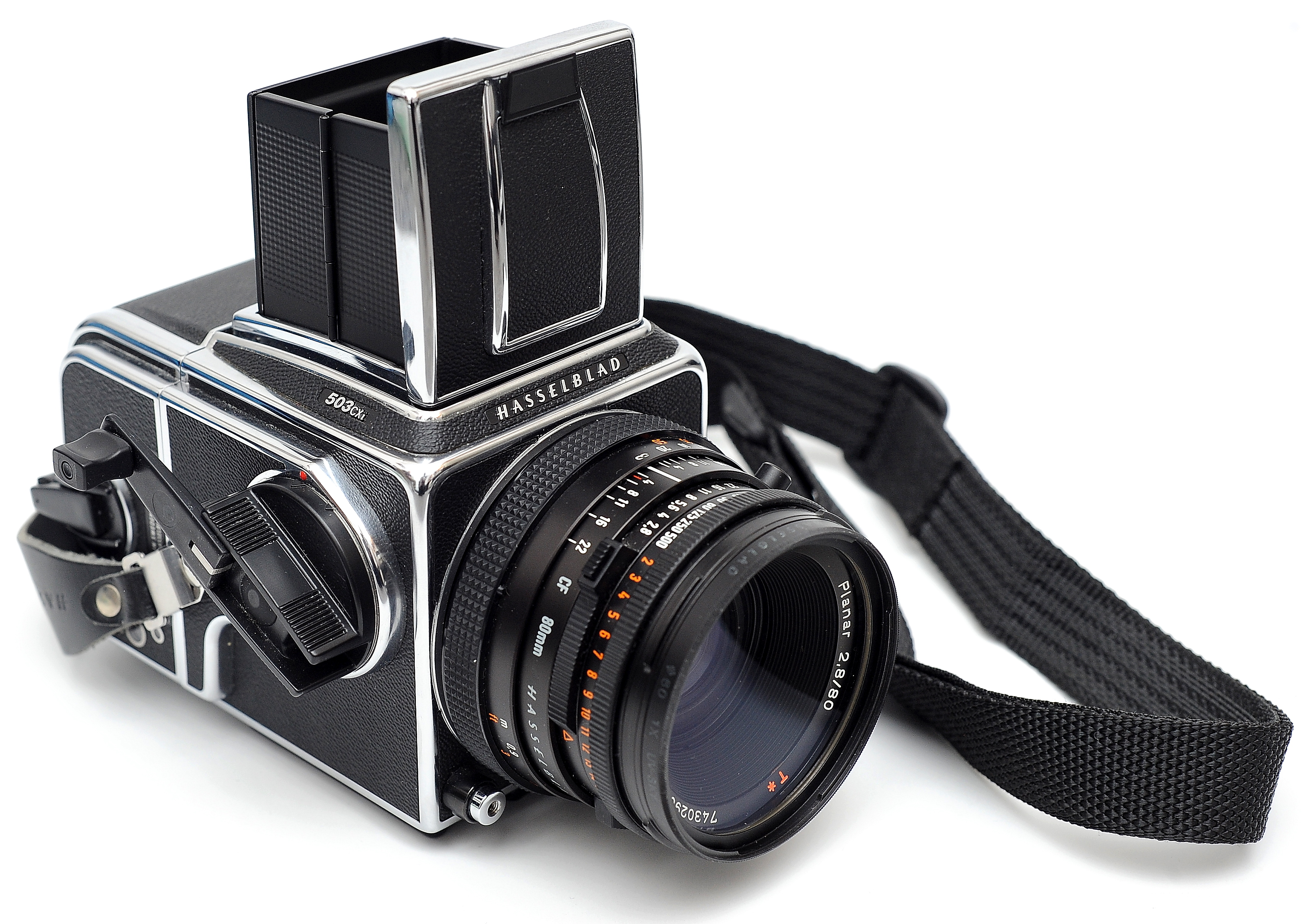
Hasselblad medium format camera

Medium-format cameras have a film size between the large-format cameras and smaller 35 mm cameras. Typically these systems use 120 or 220 roll film. The most common image sizes are 6×4.5 cm, 6×6 cm and 6×7 cm; the older 6×9 cm is rarely used. The designs of this kind of camera show greater variation than their larger brethren, ranging from monorail systems through the classic Hasselblad model with separate backs, to smaller rangefinder cameras. There are even compact amateur cameras available in this format.

==== Twin-lens reflex camera ====
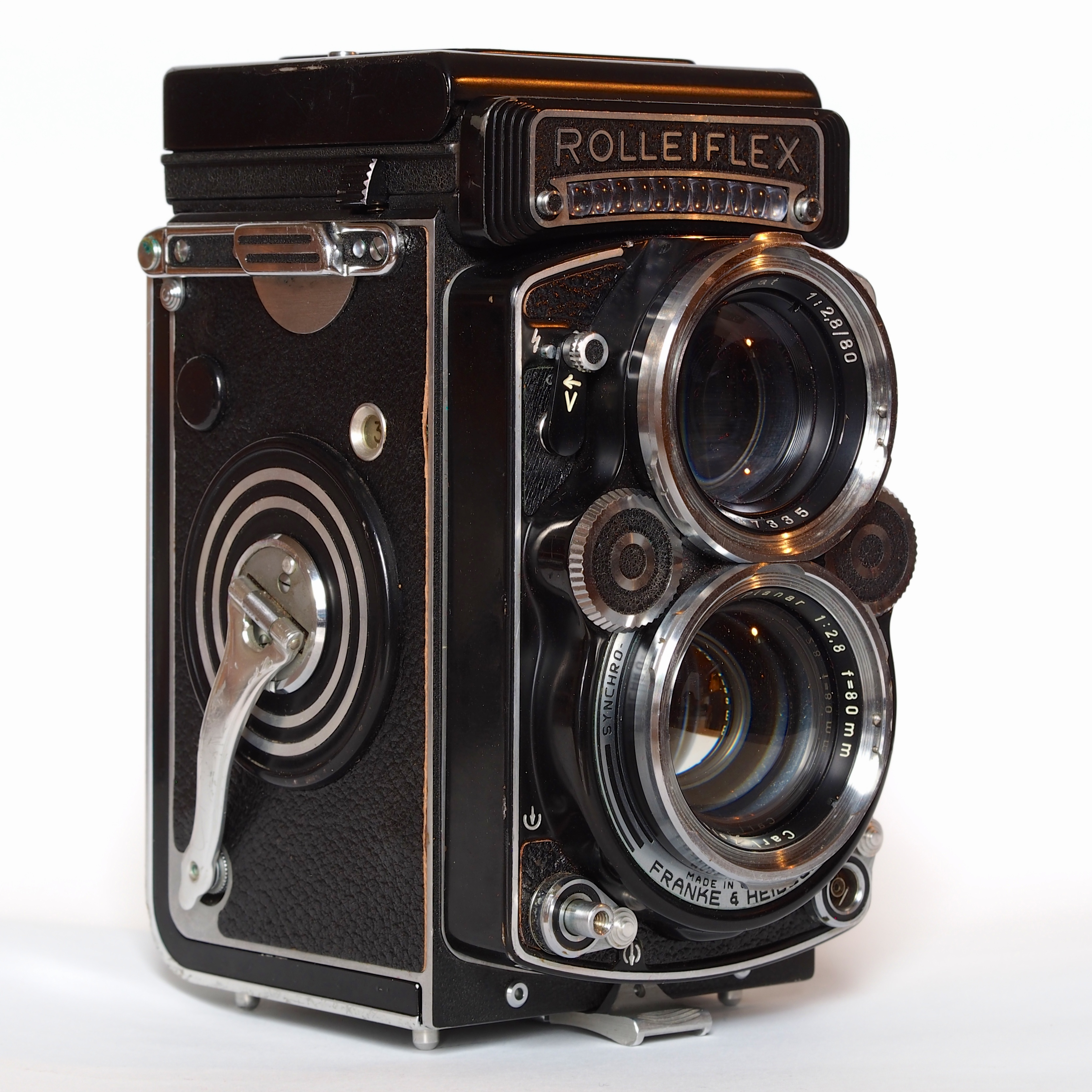
Twin-lens reflex camera

Twin-lens reflex cameras used a pair of nearly identical lenses: one to form the image and one as a viewfinder. The lenses were arranged with the viewing lens immediately above the taking lens. The viewing lens projects an image onto a viewing screen which can be seen from above. Some manufacturers such as Mamiya also provided a reflex head to attach to the viewing screen to allow the camera to be held to the eye when in use. The advantage of a TLR was that it could be easily focused using the viewing screen and that under most circumstances the view seen on the viewing screen was identical to that recorded on film. At close distances, however, parallax errors were encountered, and some cameras also included an indicator to show what part of the composition would be excluded.

Some TLRs had interchangeable lenses, but as these had to be paired lenses, they were relatively heavy and did not provide the range of focal lengths that the SLR could support. Most TLRs used 120 or 220 films; some used the smaller 127 films.

=== Compact cameras ===
==== Instant camera ====
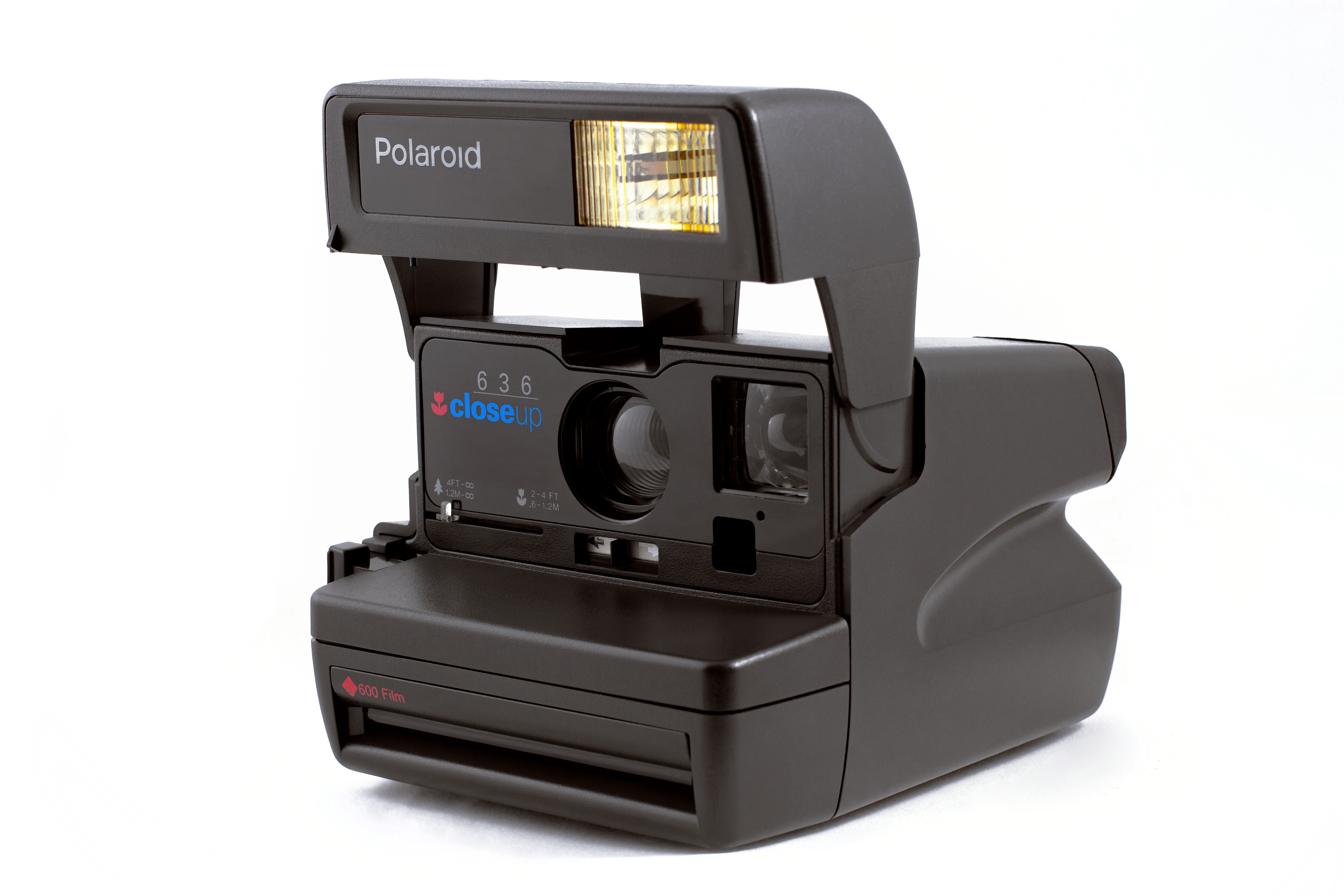
Instant Camera

After exposure, every photograph is taken through pinch rollers inside the instant camera. Thereby the developer paste contained in the paper 'sandwich' is distributed on the image. After a minute, the cover sheet just needs to be removed and one gets a single original positive image with a fixed format. With some systems, it was also possible to create an instant image negative, from which then could be made copies in the photo lab. The ultimate development was the SX-70 system of Polaroid, in which a row of ten shots – engine driven – could be made without having to remove any cover sheets from the picture. There were instant cameras for a variety of formats, as well as adapters for instant film use in medium- and large-format cameras.

==== Subminiature camera ====
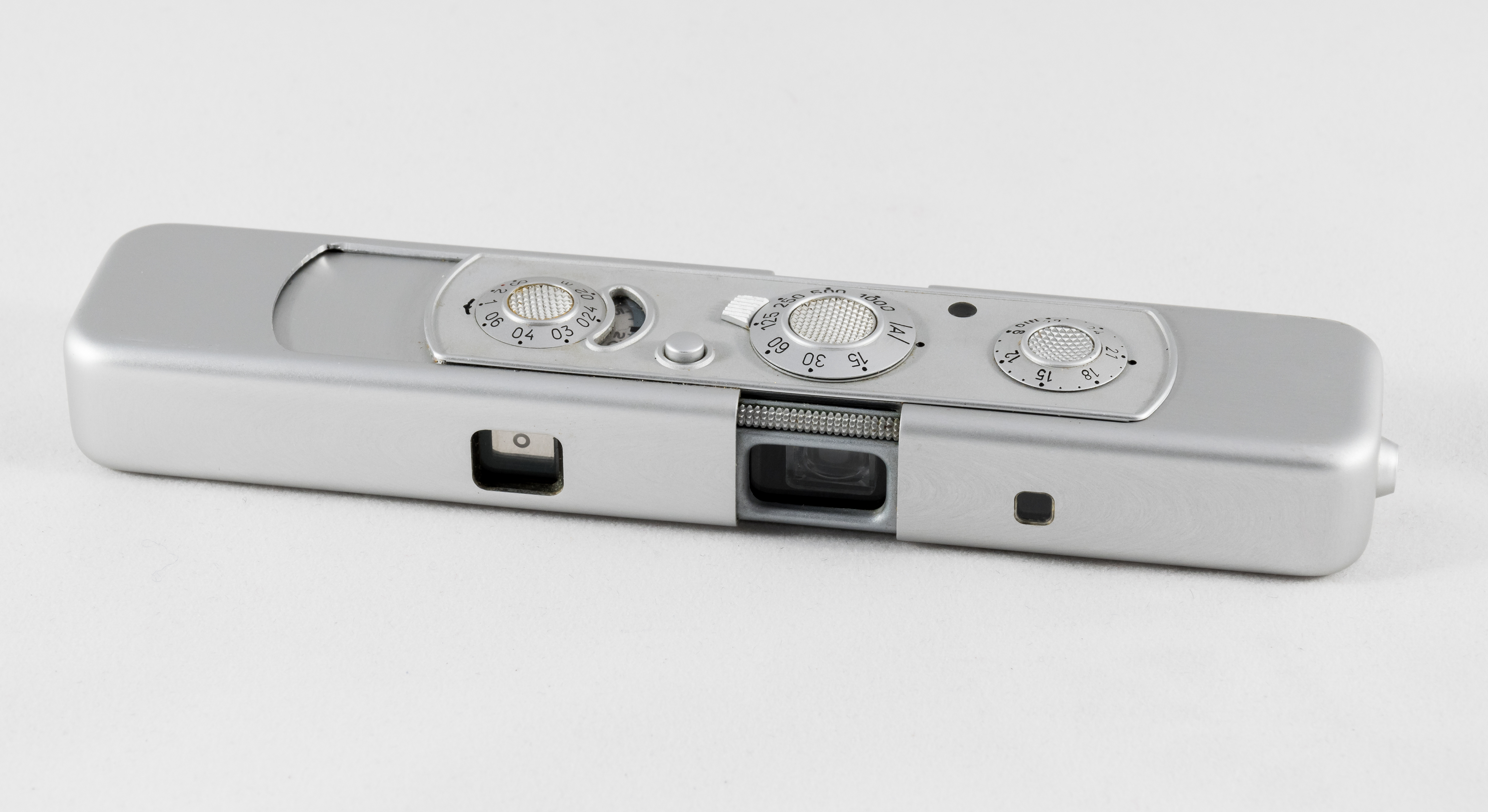
Subminiature spy camera

Subminiature cameras were first produced in the twentieth century and use film significantly smaller than 35mm. The expensive 8×11mm Minox, the only type of camera produced by the company from 1937 to 1976, became very widely known and was often used for espionage (the Minox company later also produced larger cameras). Later inexpensive subminiatures were made for general use, some using rewound 16 mm cine film. Image quality with these small film sizes was limited.

==== Folding camera ====
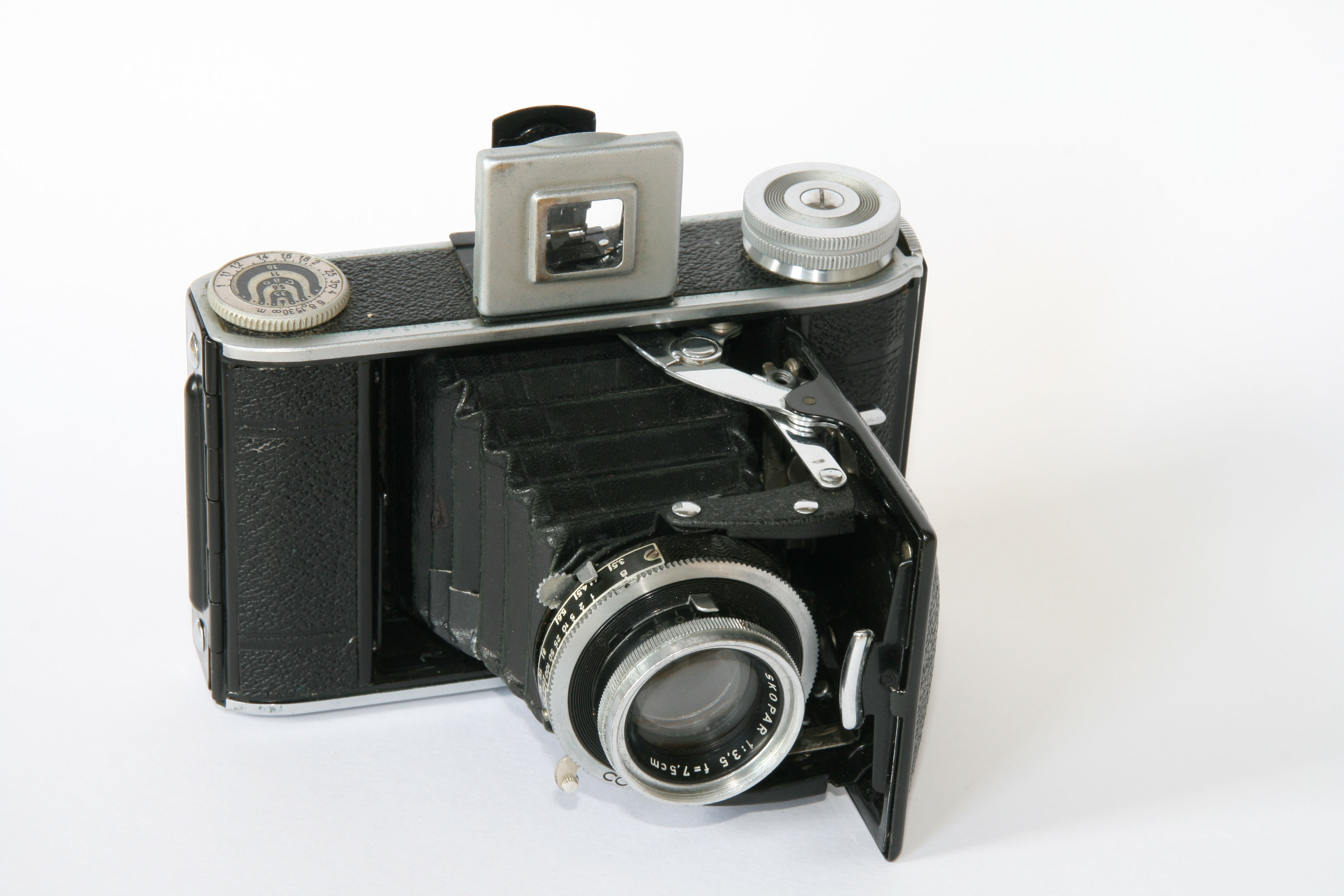
Folding camera

The introduction of films enabled the existing designs for plate cameras to be made much smaller and for the baseplate to be hinged so that it could be folded up, compressing the bellows. These designs were very compact and small models were dubbed vest pocket cameras. One of the smallest and best-selling cameras was the Vest Pocket Kodak, sold in two generations between 1912 and 1934. Folding roll film cameras were preceded by folding plate cameras, more compact than other designs.

==== Box camera ====
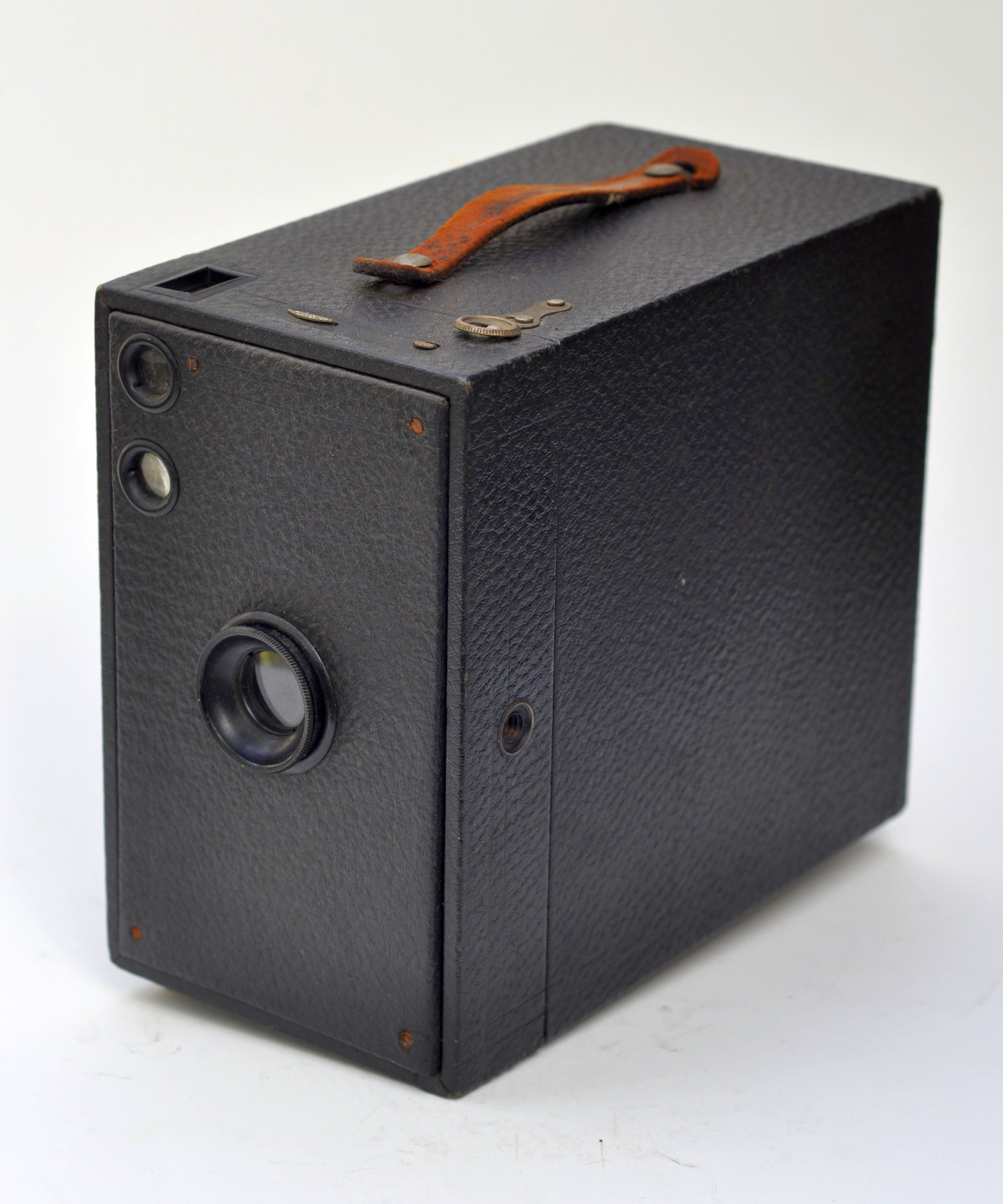
Kodak box camera

Box cameras were introduced as budget-level cameras and had few if any controls. The original box Brownie models had a small reflex viewfinder mounted on the top of the camera and had no aperture or focusing controls and just a simple shutter. Later models such as the Brownie 127 had larger direct view optical viewfinders together with a curved film path to reduce the impact of deficiencies in the lens.

=== Rangefinder camera ===
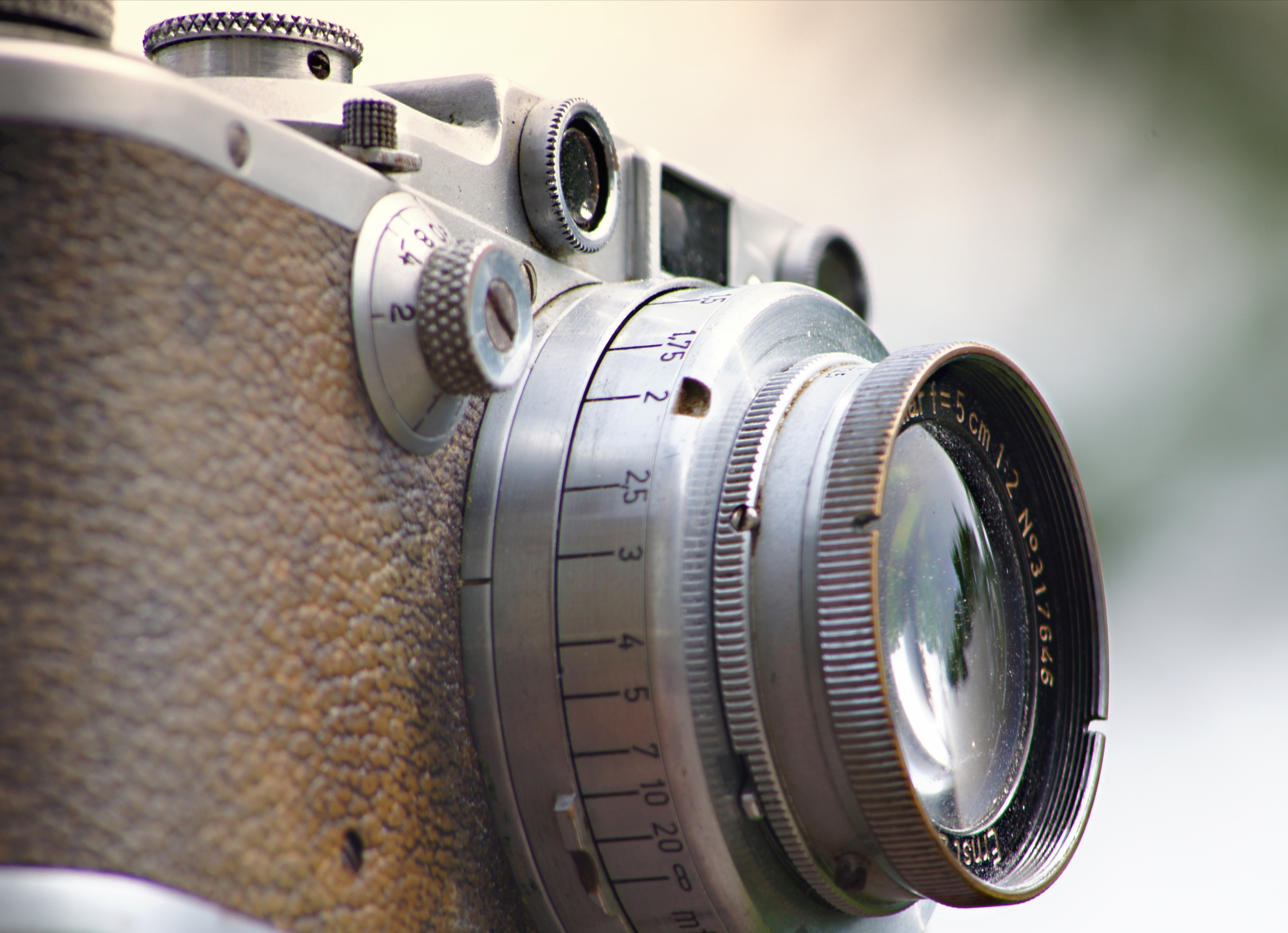
Rangefinder camera, Leica c. 1936

As camera lens technology developed and wide aperture lenses became more common, rangefinder cameras were introduced to make focusing more precise. Early rangefinders had two separate viewfinder windows, one of which is linked to the focusing mechanisms and moved right or left as the focusing ring is turned. The two separate images are brought together on a ground glass viewing screen. When vertical lines in the object being photographed meet exactly in the combined image, the object is in focus. A normal composition viewfinder is also provided. Later the viewfinder and rangefinder were combined. Many rangefinder cameras had interchangeable lenses, each lens requiring its range- and viewfinder linkages.

Rangefinder cameras were produced in half- and full-frame 35 mm and roll film (medium format).

=== Motion picture cameras ===
A movie camera or a video camera operates similarly to a still camera, except it records a series of static images in rapid succession, commonly at a rate of 24 frames per second. When the images are combined and displayed in order, the illusion of motion is achieved.

Cameras that capture many images in sequence are known as movie cameras or as cine cameras in Europe; those designed for single images are still cameras. However, these categories overlap as still cameras are often used to capture moving images in special effects work and many modern cameras can quickly switch between still and motion recording modes.

A ciné camera or movie camera takes a rapid sequence of photographs on an image sensor or strips of film. In contrast to a still camera, which captures a single snapshot at a time, the ciné camera takes a series of images, each called a frame, through the use of an intermittent mechanism.

The frames are later played back in a ciné projector at a specific speed, called the frame rate (number of frames per second). While viewing, a person's visual system merges the separate pictures to create the illusion of motion. The first ciné camera was built around 1888 and by 1890 several types were being manufactured. The standard film size for ciné cameras was quickly established as 35mm film and this remained in use until the transition to digital cinematography. Other professional standard formats include 70 mm film and 16 mm film whilst amateur filmmakers used 9.5 mm film, 8 mm film, or Standard 8 and Super 8 before the move into digital format.

The size and complexity of ciné cameras vary greatly depending on the uses required of the camera. Some professional equipment is very large and too heavy to be handheld whilst some amateur cameras were designed to be very small and light for single-handed operation.

==== Professional video camera ====
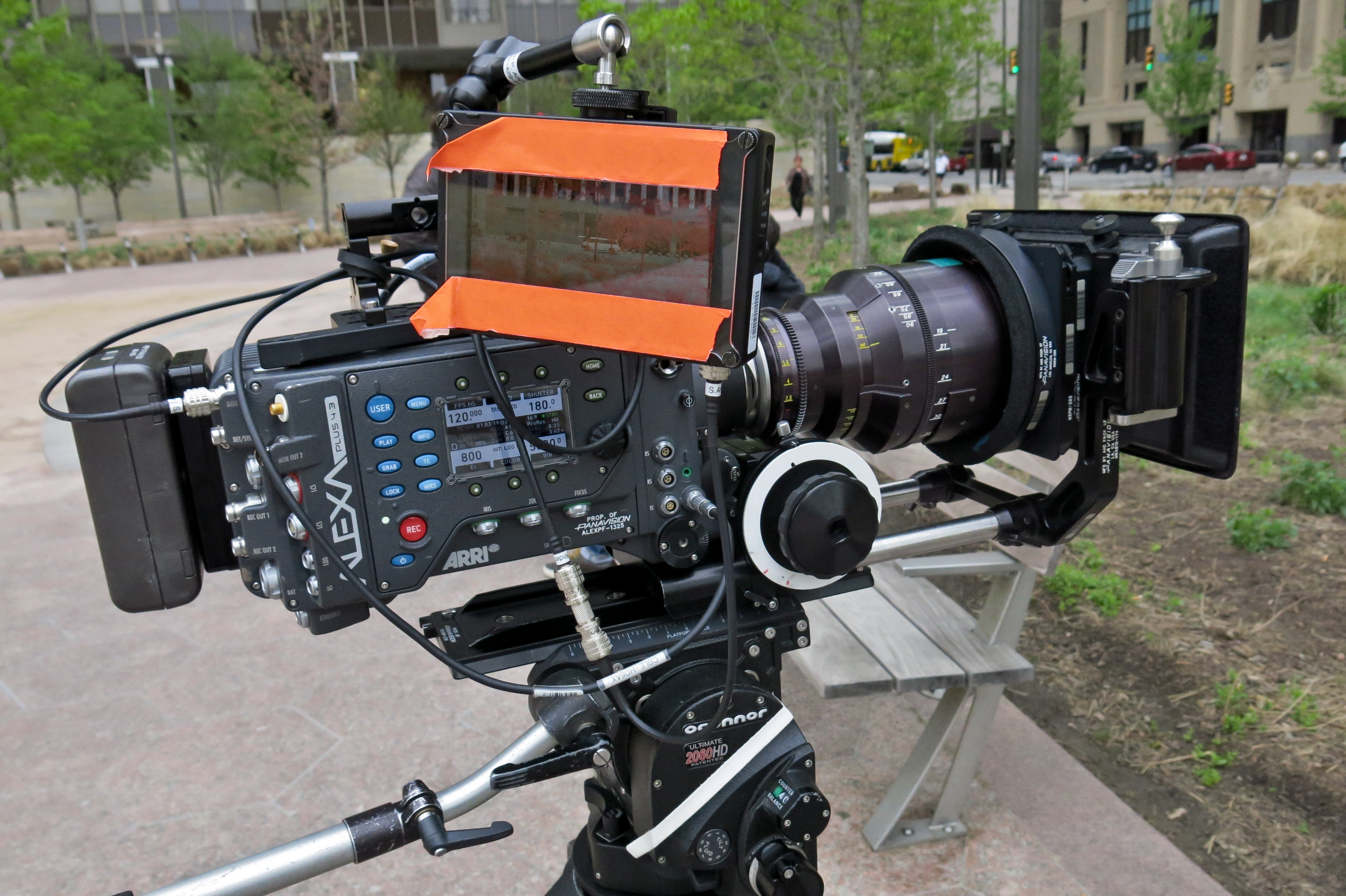
Arri Alexa, a digital movie camera

A professional video camera (often called a television camera even though the use has spread beyond television) is a high-end device for creating electronic moving images (as opposed to a movie camera, that earlier recorded the images on film). Originally developed for use in television studios, they are now also used for music videos, direct-to-video movies, corporate and educational videos, marriage videos, etc.

These cameras earlier used vacuum tubes and later electronic image sensors.

==== Camcorders ====
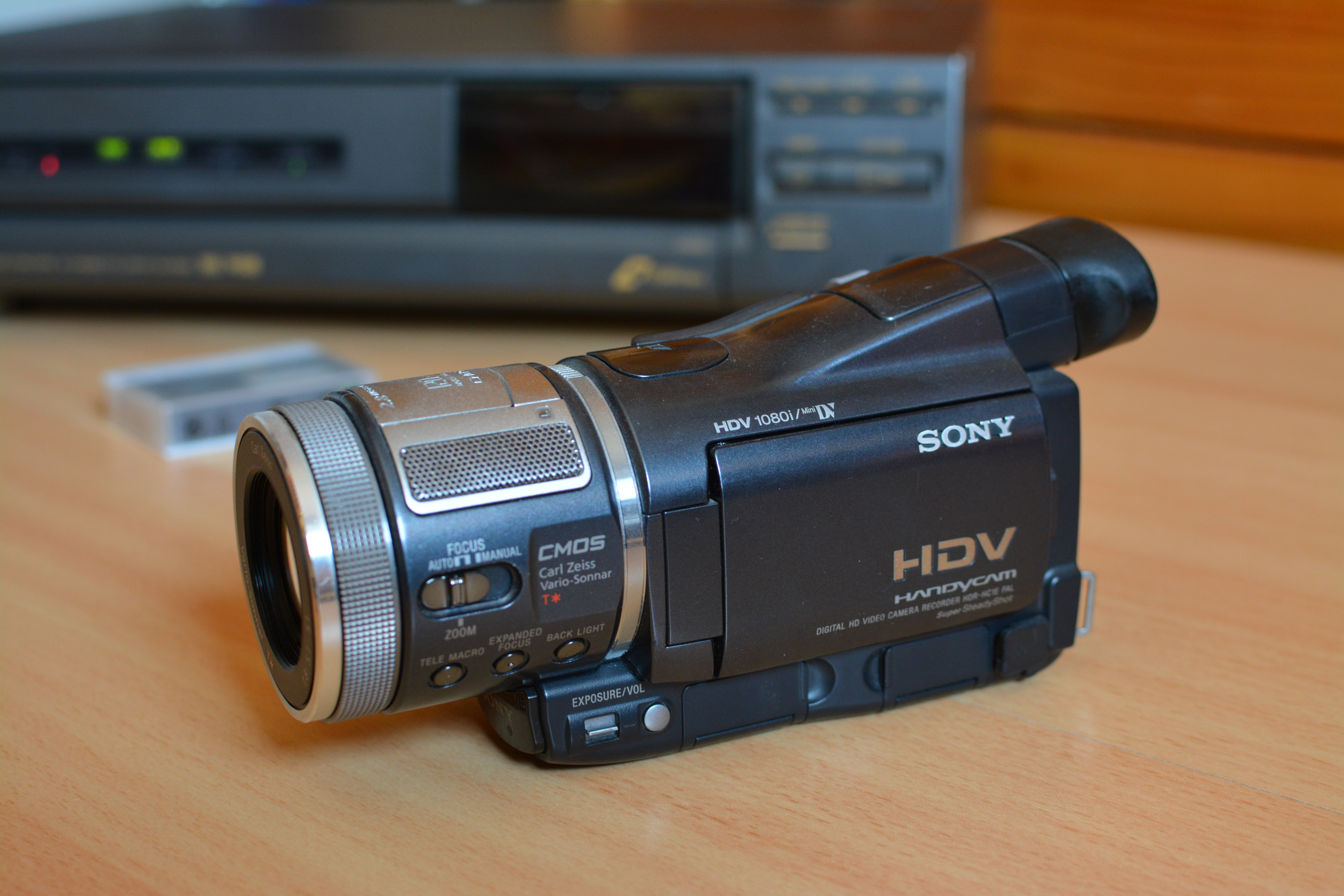
Sony HDR-HC1E, a HDV camcorder.

A camcorder is an electronic device combining a video camera and a video recorder. Although marketing materials may use the colloquial term "camcorder", the name on the package and manual is often "video camera recorder". Most devices capable of recording video are camera phones and digital cameras primarily intended for still pictures; the term "camcorder" is used to describe a portable, self-contained device, with video capture and recording its primary function.

=== Digital camera ===
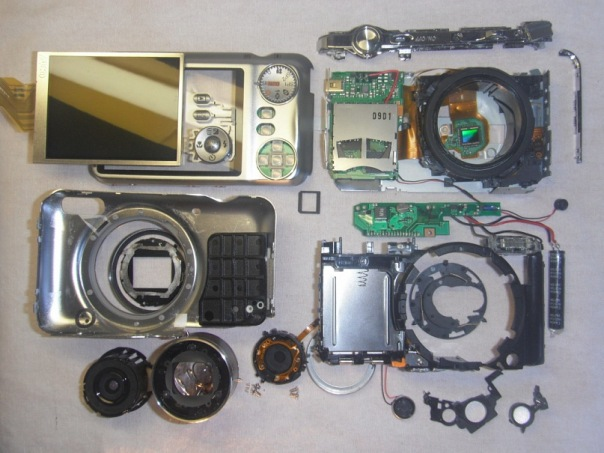
Disassembled digital camera

A digital camera (or digicam) is a camera that encodes digital images and videos and stores them for later reproduction. They typically use semiconductor image sensors. Most cameras sold today are digital, and they are incorporated into many devices ranging from mobile phones (called camera phones) to vehicles.

Digital and film cameras share an optical system, typically using a lens of variable aperture to focus light onto an image pickup device. The aperture and shutter admit the correct amount of light to the imager, just as with film but the image pickup device is electronic rather than chemical. However, unlike film cameras, digital cameras can display images on a screen immediately after being captured or recorded, and store and delete images from memory. Most digital cameras can also record moving videos with sound. Some digital cameras can crop and stitch pictures and perform other elementary image editing.

Consumers adopted digital cameras in the 1990s. Professional video cameras transitioned to digital around the 2000s–2010s. Finally, movie cameras transitioned to digital in the 2010s.

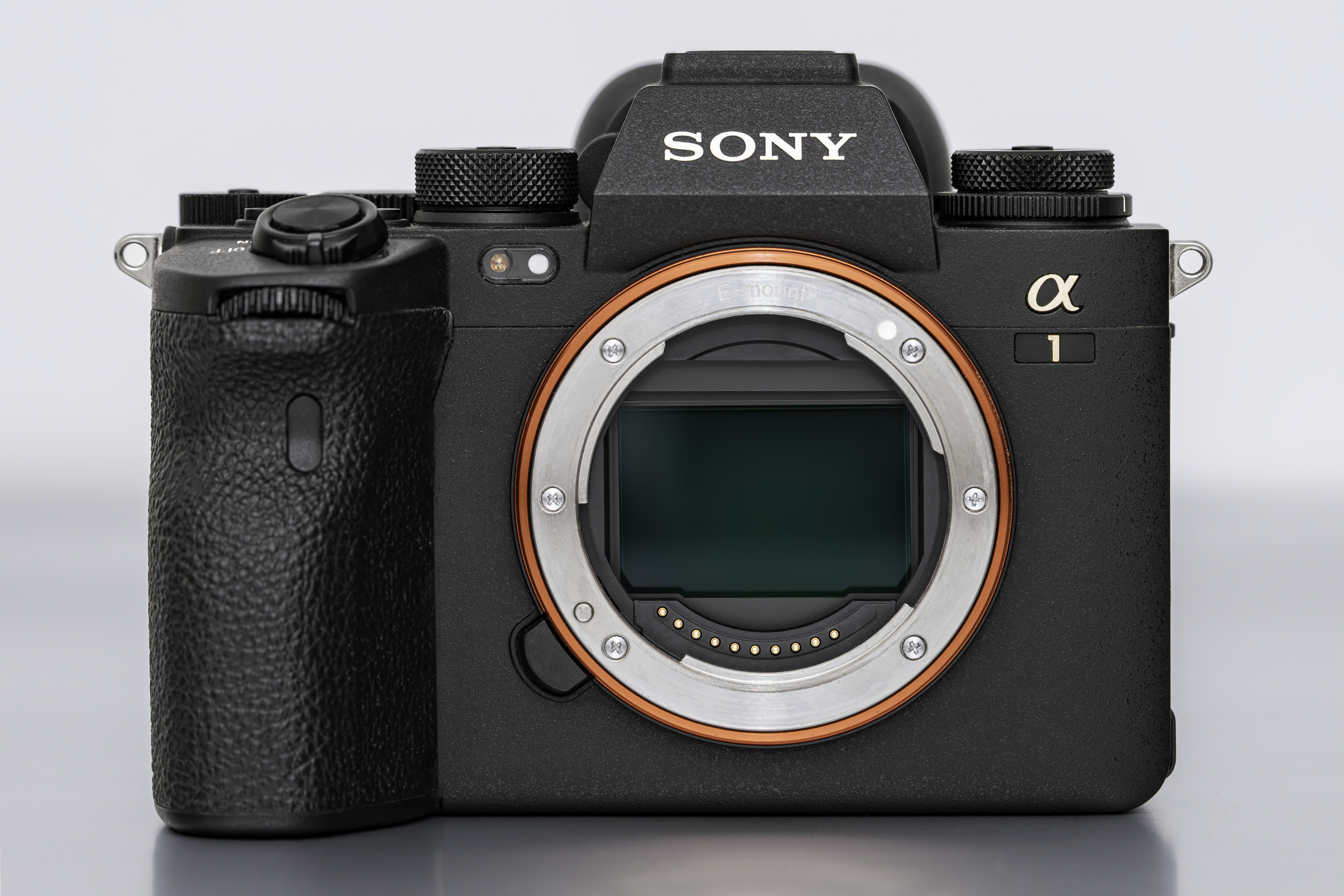
Sony Alpha 1, a full-frame mirrorless digital camera

The first camera using digital electronics to capture and store images was developed by Kodak engineer Steven Sasson in 1975. He used a charge-coupled device (CCD) provided by Fairchild Semiconductor, which provided only 0.01 megapixels to capture images. Sasson combined the CCD device with movie camera parts to create a digital camera that saved black and white images onto a cassette tape. The images were then read from the cassette and viewed on a TV monitor. Later, cassette tapes were replaced by flash memory.

In 1986, Japanese company Nikon introduced an analog-recording electronic single-lens reflex camera, the Nikon SVC.

The first full-frame digital SLR cameras were developed in Japan from around 2000 to 2002: the MZ-D by Pentax, the N Digital by Contax's Japanese R6D team, and the EOS-1Ds by Canon. Gradually in the 2000s, the full-frame DSLR became the dominant camera type for professional photography.

On most digital cameras a display, often a liquid-crystal display (LCD), permits the user to view the scene to be recorded and settings such as ISO speed, exposure, and shutter speed.

==== Camera phone ====
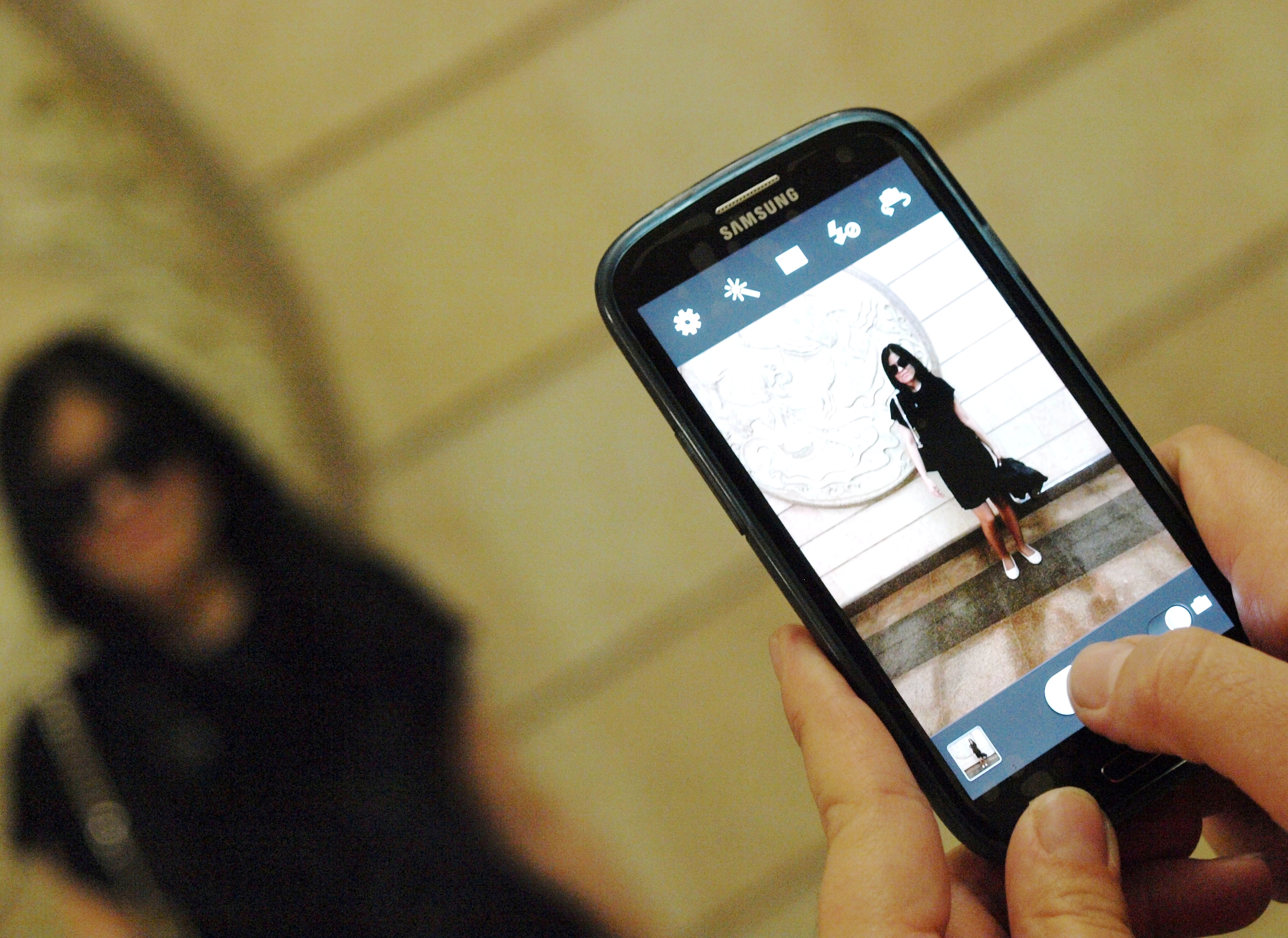
Smartphone with built-in camera

In 2000, Sharp introduced the world's first digital camera phone, the J-SH04 J-Phone, in Japan. By the mid-2000s, higher-end cell phones had an integrated digital camera, and by the beginning of the 2010s, almost all smartphones had an integrated digital camera.

== See also ==
- Camera matrix
- History of the camera
- List of camera types
- List of digital camera brands
