= Peake =

Peake may refer to:

== Places ==
=== South Australia ===
- Hundred of Peake, a cadastral unit
- Peake, South Australia, a town and locality
- District Council of Peake, a former local government area
- The Peake, abandoned locality

== Other uses ==
- Peake (surname), people with the surname Peake

== See also ==
- Peak (disambiguation)
