= Peek =

Peek or PEEK may refer to:

== Computing ==
- Peek (data type operation), an operation on data types such as stacks and queues
- PEEK and POKE, the low-level commands of the BASIC programming language
- Peek (mobile Internet device), an email-only mobile handheld device
- Peek, an ADABAS/NATURAL utility
- Peek (software), a Linux application to create GIF animations

== People with the surname ==
- Antwan Peek (born 1979), American footballer
- Ben Peek (born 1976), Australian author
- Bertrand Meigh Peek (1891–1965), British astronomer
- Burton Peek (1872–1960), former president of Deere & Company
- Dan Peek (1950–2011), musician
- Frank William Peek (1881–1933), American electrical engineer and inventor
- Kim Peek (1951–2009), American savant
- Paul Peek (musician) (1937–2001), musician
- Paul Peek (politician) (1904–1987)
- Peek baronets
  - Henry Peek (1825–1898), 1st Baronet, importer of spices and tea
  - Cuthbert Peek (1855–1901), 2nd Baronet, astronomer and meteorologist
- Sam Peek (born 1999), American basketball player

== Other uses ==
- Polyether ether ketone (PEEK), the family of thermoplastic resins
- Peek, Oklahoma, a US ghost town
- Peek (crater), a small lunar impact crater in the northern part of the Mare Smythii near the eastern limb of the Moon
- Peek & Son, piano manufacturer

== See also ==
- Peak (disambiguation)
