= Camera monitor =

Camera monitor at a sports event.

A camera monitor (or external monitor) is a monitor that attaches externally to a digital camera to aid with photography and cinematography. Camera monitors typically have larger displays than the built-in monitors on consumer cameras, and are also usually brighter and able to reproduce color better. Consumer friendly units use HDMI for connecting to the camera, while higher end camera monitors may also offer SDI connections.

While some are powered by a single battery, others can be powered by two batteries and offer a hot swapping capability. It's not uncommon for an AC adapter to be available as well for indoor photography or filming.

== Functions ==
In addition to providing a larger display, many camera monitors provide additional tools to assist camera operators. Such tools include framing guides, focus peaking, zebra stripes, waveform monitors (oftentimes as an "RGB parade"), vectorscopes and false color to highlight areas of the image critical to the operator. Most typically provide the ability to apply a LUT to the video in real-time allowing filmmakers to view their footage with their color grading already applied.

== Recorders ==
Some camera monitors also offer a recording function. These recorders typically encode footage in a higher quality (using CODECs such as Apple ProRes or Avid Technology's DNxHR codec) and to larger storage mediums than many consumer cameras provide internally. Additionally, many cameras output higher quality video (with less or no chroma subsampling and potentially a higher color depth) through their external connections than they can record internally. For example, some cameras output 10-bit color with 4:2:2 chroma subsampling through their HDMI connections, while only recording 8-bit color with 4:2:0 chroma subsampling internally.

Recorder monitors are also used in conjunction with PTZ cameras to allow recording and editing on the fly. This has the twin benefit of avoiding the PTZ camera getting too hot as well as allowing editing to take place in real time with the use of LUTs etc., thus saving time and money.
