= Peaking =

Peaking may refer to:

- Peaking, in improperly installed laminate flooring
- Antenna peaking, orienting a directional antenna toward the greatest radio signal amplitude
- Focus peaking, a feature in digital viewfinders that detects and highlights in-focus contours
- Peaking power plant, or peaker, a power plant that runs only when there is a high demand for electricity
- Peaking tone, or rising-falling tone, in tonal languages

== See also ==
- Peak (disambiguation)
- Peking (disambiguation), old Western name of Beijing, and its namesakes
