= Peak FM =

Peak FM may refer to:

- Peak FM (North Derbyshire)
- KKPK, Colorado Springs, Colorado
- CKCB-FM, Collingwood, Ontario, Canada
- CJAV-FM, Port Alberni, British Columbia, Canada
- CKPK-FM, Vancouver, British Columbia, Canada

== See also ==
- The Peak (disambiguation)
