= John Peake =

John Peake may refer to:

- John Peake (field hockey) (1924–2022), English field hockey player
- John Peake (game designer), game designer
