= Dew shield =

Photography equipment

A dew shield is a device used to prevent moisture or condensation buildup on the lens of a camera or telescope collector during night observations. The dew shield either shades the lens or provides a small amount of warm air directly in front of the lens or collector to prevent dew from collecting on the element. Some dew shields work by using a heating element that keeps the objective lens warm enough to keep the dew from collecting.
