= Bertrand Meigh Peek =

British astronomer

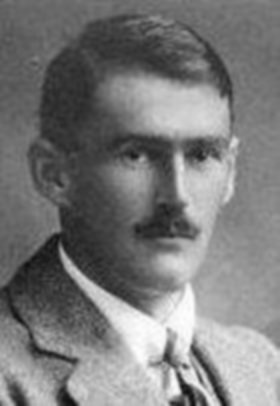

Bertrand Meigh Peek M.A. FRAS (1891 – 1965) was a British astronomer.

Peek used an observatory at Solihull, Birmingham, England, from 1923 until 1947 to make a series of observations (with notes published in the Monthly Notices of the Royal Astronomical Society.) The observatory was dismantled in 1947. Among the targets of his observations was the planet Jupiter, and he served as British Astronomical Association Mars Section director (1930–1931) Saturn Section director (1934–1935), and Jupiter Section director (1934–1949). He served as president of the BAA from 1938 until 1940.

From 1946 until 1955 he taught at Simon Langton Grammar School for Boys, Canterbury, where he led the Astronomical Society. He retired through ill health and died in 1965.

In 1958 he published The Planet Jupiter, a treatise on the giant planet based on visual observations of the planet by the Jupiter Section of the BAA. (A revised version of this book was published in 1981.)

Based on notes provided by his son Brian to the BAA, Bertrand Peek:

- was a three-time winner of the Cambridge mathematics prize;
- was a Cambridge tennis champion;
- was a team member of the Anglo-Soviet chess match;
- served as a Major in the Hampshire Regiment during World War I;
- was a yachtsman;
- composed music;
- was knowledgeable in early radio technology.

The Moon crater Peek is named after him.
