= Peek (crater) =

Crater on the Moon

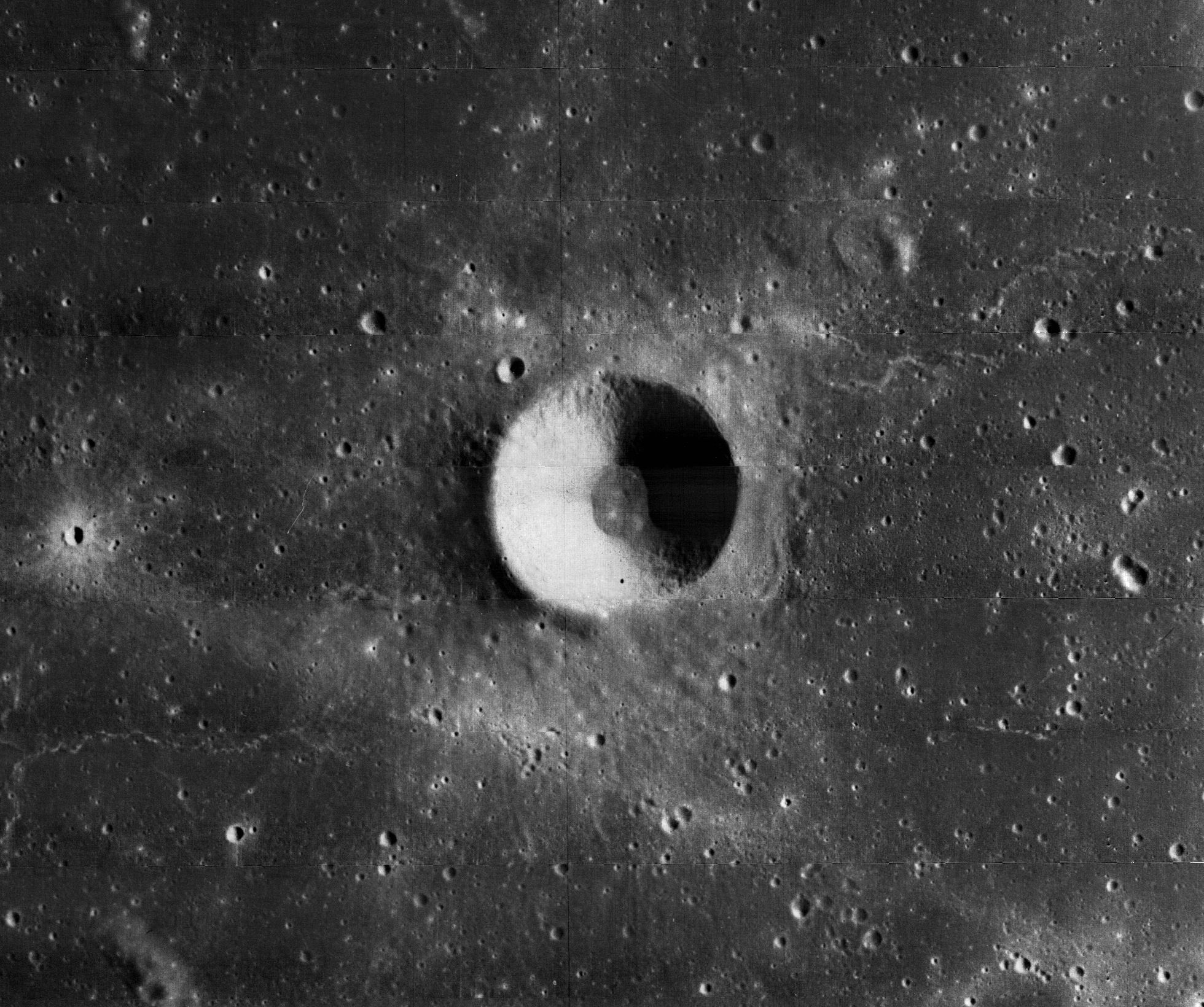
- Lunar crater Peek from Lunar Orbiter 1. NASA/L&PI image.
- Coordinates: 2.6°N 86.9°E
- Diameter: 12 km
- Depth: 1.80 km
- Colongitude: 274° at sunrise
- Eponym: Bertrand M. Peek

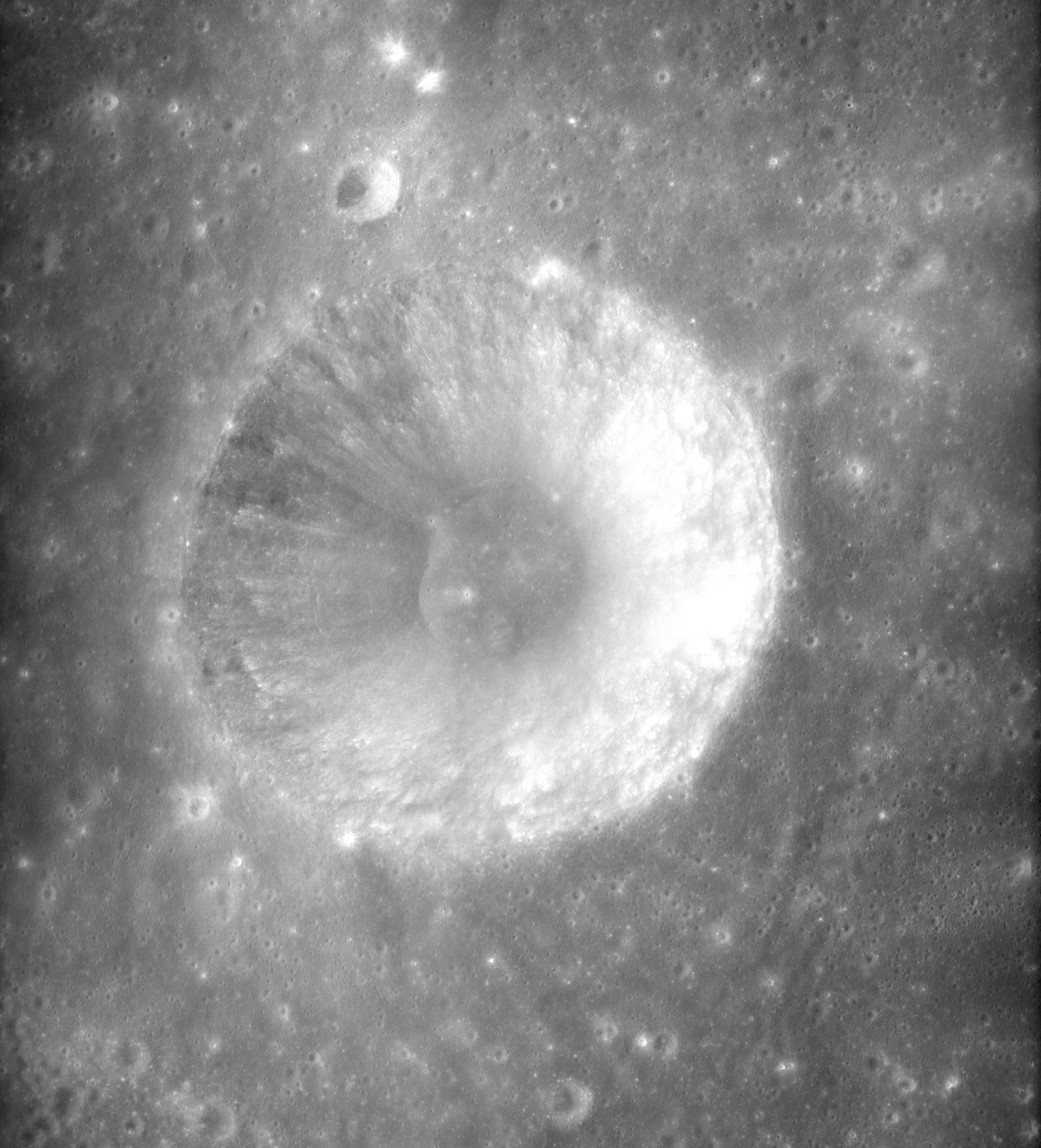
Apollo 16 panoramic camera image

Peek is a small lunar impact crater that is located in the northern part of the Mare Smythii near the eastern limb of the Moon. This part of the lunar surface is subject to the effects of libration, and the crater can be hidden from sight during an unfavorable libration. Even when visible, however, the crater is seen almost edge-on, making it difficult to see much detail from the Earth. Due to foreshortening the crater appears close to Schubert, even though the two are about 60 km apart. It lies to the south-southeast of the large crater Neper.

This crater is generally circular and bowl-shaped, with a small interior floor at the center of the sloping inner walls. The crater has a higher albedo than the surrounding dark lunar mare, making it appear slightly brighter than the nearby terrain. The crater has not been significantly eroded by subsequent impacts.
