= Peek, Oklahoma =

Coordinates: 35.97032°N 99.63094°W

Peek is an extinct town in Ellis County, Oklahoma, United States.

A post office called Peek was established in 1906, and remained in operation until 1954. The community was named for Vestal Peek, a pioneer citizen.
