= Peak farmland =

Maximum usable amount of land needed for crop cultivation

Peak farmland is the maximum usable amount of land needed for crop cultivation (agricultural land) for a given region (country or an entire world). Supporters of the peak farmland theory argue that even with the growing world population, the need for more farmland is decreasing, as food production yields per acre of farmland are rising faster than the global demand for food. This is supported by the fact that the area dedicated to farmland in some countries, both developed (e.g. Finland) and developing (e.g. India, China), has already begun to decline. Globally, while the total amount of arable land is still increasing, the area of permanent pasture has been in decline since 1998, with at least 60 million hectares no longer grazed. It is argued that other countries, such as the United States, are at their peak farmland now.

== Description ==
The concept is usually referenced to the work of Jesse Ausubel and Iddo Wernick. They predict that over the next fifty years an area of at least 146 million hectares is going to be released from farming and will probably revert to its natural state. As land conversion (from a natural state to human use) is one of the greatest threats to the natural environment in general, and biodiversity in particular, this is seen as good for the environment.

Together with Iddo Wernick [...] we believe that humanity has reached Peak Farmland, and that a large net global restoration of land to Nature is ready to begin. Happily, the cause is not exhaustion of arable land, as many have feared, but rather moderation of population and tastes and ingenuity of farmers. – Jesse H. Ausubel

Geisler and Currens note, however, that "Peak Farmland, though newly named, is a long-standing issue" that has been debated by scholars for decades. The issue deals with two opposing views: one that predicts that more and more farmland will be needed to sustain the growing world population, and the other (the peak farmland view) that progress in agricultural techniques, measured in steadily increasing crop yields from a set amount of farmland, will result in a decrease in the amount of farmland needed to feed the world's population, eventually leading to a decrease in the world's acreage of farmland.

== See also ==
- Food security
- Peak oil
- Sustainable agriculture
- Sustainable fishery
