= John Peake (game designer) =

British game maker

- Occupation: Game designer

John Peake is a traditional board game maker and one of the founders of Games Workshop.

== Career ==
In early 1975, John Peake and his school friends – Ian Livingstone and Steve Jackson, who shared a Shepherd's Bush flat in London with him – wanted to make their own games; they chose the name "Games Workshop" for their company because it their intention would be to craft their games by hand. Peake was a craftsman and began making backgammon games using inlaid mahogany with a cherry veneer and before long he started crafting sets for games such as mancala, nine men's morris, go, and tower of Hanoi. Jackson, Livingstone and Peake began publishing the monthly games newsletter, Owl and Weasel (1975–1977), to provide support for their business. Peake was not interested in the new role-playing game industry, and when he saw that Games Workshop was getting more involved with RPGs he left the company in 1976.
