= Peak =

Peak or The Peak may refer to:

== Basic meanings ==
=== Geology ===
- Mountain peak
  - Pyramidal peak, a mountaintop that has been sculpted by erosion to form a point

=== Sciences ===
- Peak hour or rush hour, in traffic congestion
- Peak (geometry), an (n-3)-dimensional element of a polytope
- Peak electricity demand or peak usage
- Peak-to-peak, the highest (or sometimes the highest and lowest) points on a varying waveform
- Peak (pharmacology), the time at which a drug reaches its maximum plasma concentration
- Peak experience, psychological term for a euphoric mental state

=== Resource production ===
In Hubbert peak theory's model of resource production trends, the peak is the moment when the production of a resource reaches a maximum level, after which it declines; in particular see:

- Peak oil
- Peak car
- Peak coal
- Peak farmland
- Peak gas
- Peak minerals
- Peak water
- Peak wheat
- Peak wood

=== Other basic meanings ===
- Visor, a part of a hat, known as a "peak" in British English
- Peaked cap

== Geography ==
- Peak District in the Midlands of England
  - The Peak, summit of Kinder Scout, the highest point in the Peak District
- Ravenscar, North Yorkshire, a village in England formerly known as "Peak" and "The Peak"
- The Peak (Hong Kong), also known as Victoria Peak
- Victoria Peak (disambiguation)
- Peak, a village in Ya Tung, Cambodia

== People ==
- Bob Peak (1927–1992), American commercial illustrator
- Howard W. Peak (b. 1948), American politician
- Junius W. Peak (1845–1934), Confederate soldier and Texas Ranger

== Products and brands ==
- BIAS Peak, a professional audio editing program on the Apple platform
- GeeksPhone Peak, a mobile phone
- PEAKS, a software program for tandem mass spectroscopy
- Peak Sport Products, a Chinese sneaker brand
- The Peak Twin Towers, an apartment building in Jakarta, Indonesia
- Peak (automotive products), a manufacturer of automotive products
- Healthpeak Properties, an American real estate company having stock that trades under the symbol PEAK

=== Transportation ===
- A nickname used to refer to the British Rail Class 44 diesel locomotives, and also classes 45 and 46
- The highest corner of a four-sided, fore-aft sail
- PRS Peak, a German mountain descent paraglider design
- The Peak Terminus, Hong Kong

== Media and entertainment ==
- The Peak (newspaper), a student newspaper of Simon Fraser University in Burnaby, British Columbia, Canada
- The Peak (TV series), a TV series in Singapore
- CFBV, a radio station branded as The Peak based in Smithers, British Columbia
- 98.7 The Peak, a radio station in Phoenix, Arizona
- 100.5 The Peak, a radio station based in Vancouver, British Columbia
- 107.1 The Peak, a radio station based in White Plains, New York
- CKCB-FM, a radio station branded as 95.1 The Peak FM based in Collingwood, Ontario
- KPEK, a radio station on 100.3 FM branded as The Peak based in Albuquerque, New Mexico
- Peak: Secrets from the New Science of Expertise, a 2016 book
- Peak (novel), by Roland Smith
- Peak Records, a record label
- "Peak", a song by Drake from Scorpion
- "Peak", a song by Anne-Marie from Speak Your Mind
- Peak (video game), a 2025 video game

== Other uses ==
- Peak Alternative High School, former school in Michigan, US

== See also ==
- Peaking (disambiguation)
- Peek (disambiguation)
- Pique (disambiguation)
