= Zebra patterning =

Camera feature

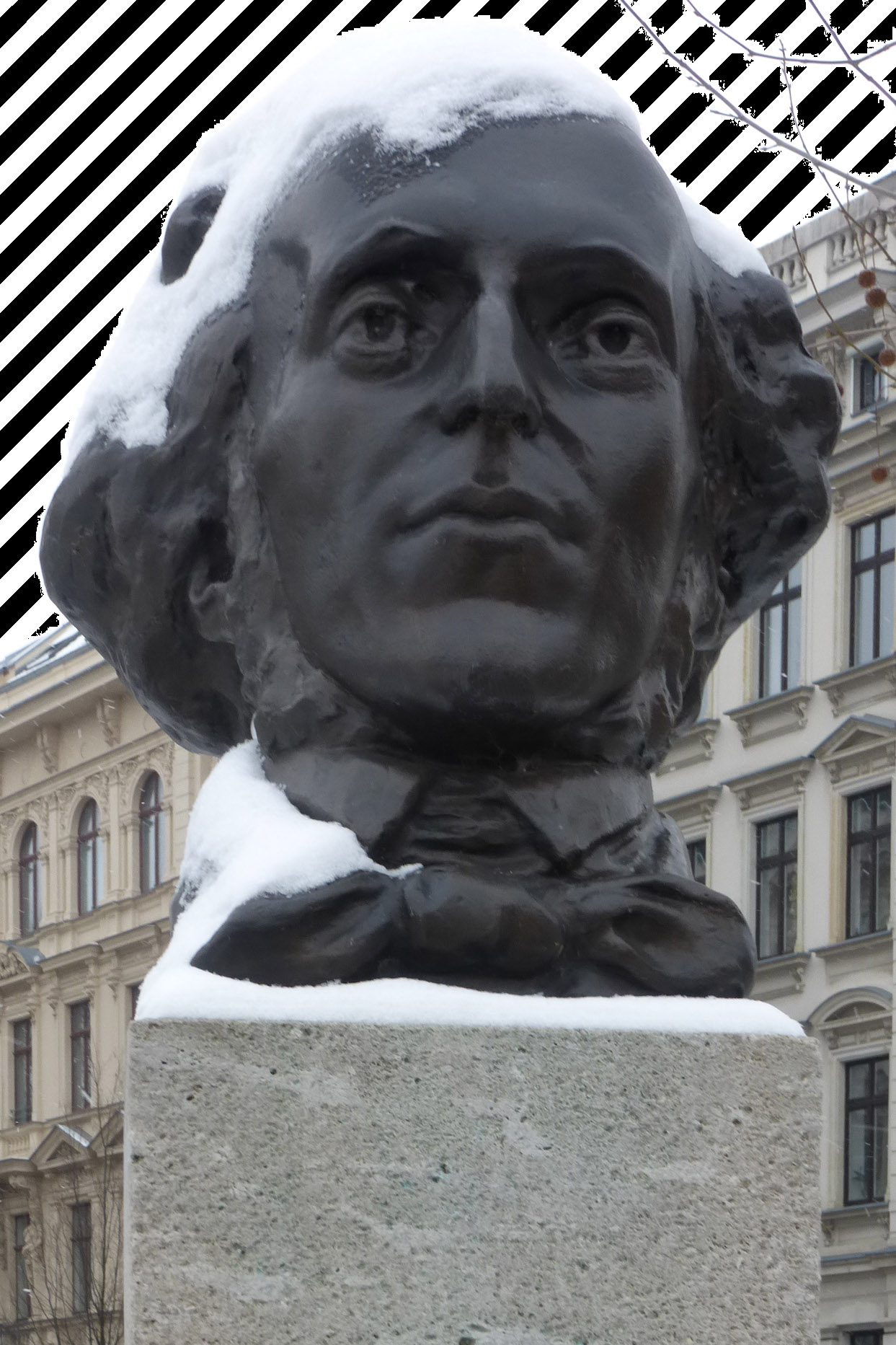
Picture of Mendelssohn bust with zebra patterning

Zebra patterning, or zebra stripes, is a feature found on some prosumer and most professional video cameras to aid in correct exposure. When enabled, areas of the image over a certain threshold are filled with a striped or cross-hatch pattern to dramatically highlight areas where too much light is falling on the image sensor.

Often, a threshold level can be set, e.g. 70%, 80%, 90%, or 100% (with 100% meaning pure white, or over-exposed, AKA 100 IRE). A lower threshold like 70 to 80% can help correctly expose many skin tones, while higher numbers help ensure correct overall scene exposure.

== See also ==
- Clipping (photography)
