= John Peake (field hockey) =

British field hockey player (1924–2022)

Personal information
- Born: 26 August 1924 Cambridge, England
- Died: 30 March 2022 (aged 97)

Sport
- Sport: Field hockey
Senior career
Years	Team	Caps	Goals
1948	Combined Services	-	-
National team
Years	Team	Caps	Goals
–	Great Britain		-
–	England		-
Medal record
Men's field hockey
Representing Great Britain
Silver medal – second place	1948 London	Team competition

John Morris Peake CBE (26 August 1924 – 30 March 2022) was a British and English international field hockey player who competed in the 1948 Summer Olympics.

== Early life ==
Peake was born on 26 August 1924 and attended St Faith's School in Cambridge, and was a student there from 1931 to 1938. Following this he won a scholarship to Repton School, after which he went on to read mechanical engineering at Clare College, Cambridge where he met his future wife.

Peake was a reserve for England at squash. Peake also made it through two rounds of qualifying to get into Wimbledon, however he lost when he needed one more set to get in. During the Second World War Peake joined the Royal Navy.

== 1948 London Olympics ==
In June 1946 London was awarded the 1948 Olympics, the 1944 Games had originally been intended to be hosted by London but was cancelled due to the Second World War. Peake was selected for the Olympic team early in 1948 and had very little time to train with the team, he later said “The hockey season ended at Easter with the great gathering at Folkestone. And of course [the Olympics] was going to be in the summer. We hardly met each other. It wasn’t until six weeks before leaving that we had a gathering. We got together with some local people and played, and this is the first time we saw the people from Scotland and Wales. We were all pretty fit; we were playing tennis or squash or something. Nevertheless, we had nothing like the long build-up that they have now."

He was selected for the Olympic Trial and subsequently was a member of the British field hockey team for the 1948 Olympic Games in London. Peake played in all five matches as forward, the first of which was a goalless draw against Switzerland on 31 July 1948. That result was followed up on 5 August by beating USA 11–0, two days later repeating that result against Afghanistan. Peake and the rest of his team qualified for the semifinal's top group and played Pakistan on 9 August who they beat 2–0. The final was played against the newly independent India on 12 August at Wembley Stadium, the Indians won 4–0 with two goals being scored by the legendary Indian hockey player Balbir Singh Sr. Peake and the British team won the silver medal, Peake did play a few more times internationally but this was the last major tournament Peake competed in and was the penultimate medal that the British hockey team won at the Olympics until 1984.

== After the Olympics ==
After leaving professional hockey at the age of 28 Peake later became chairman of Baker Perkins, an engineering company focusing on food processing equipment, and was appointed a CBE in the 1986 Birthday Honours.

Peake was one of the torchbearers for the Peterborough leg of the 2012 Olympic torch relay. At the age of 87, Peake was one of the oldest torchbearers, he later donated the torch to St Faith's School as a thanks to the teachers who he said ‘nurtured his love of sport in the early years.’

In 2013 Peake spoke about what he thought of the changes in the rules to hockey saying 'some of the rules that have changed are for the better. We used to have a roll in from the side and that used to be a rather tangled thing, and long corners weren't very special. We used to have a 'sticks' rule (lifting the stick above the shoulder). That's gone and I think that's a pity.' As of January 2021, Peake, 96, lived in a retirement home in Wimbledon, London. He died on 30 March 2022, at the age of 97.
