= Focus peaking =

Camera feature

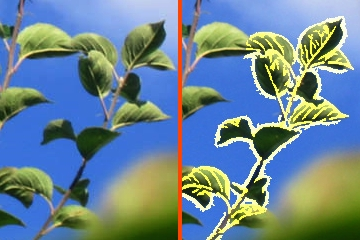
A digital camera image without (left) and with focus peaking (right).

Focus peaking is a focusing aid in live preview or electronic viewfinders on digital cameras that places a white or coloured highlight on in-focus edges (contours) within an image using an edge detect filter. It was initially only common on video cameras, as the feature is incompatible with the optical viewfinders found on DSLRs. Some external monitors and some image organisation programs can also perform focus peaking separately from the camera body. It is sometimes referred to as "focus assist" or "peaking highlights". Focus peaking is fast but it is considered to be inferior to digitally zooming in, and is not recommended when taking pictures with either a very narrow or very wide depth of field.
