= Seita Emori =

Japanese environmental scientist

Seita Emori (江守 正多, Emori Seita; born 1970 in Kanagawa, Japan) is a Japanese environmental scientist whose most noted work focuses upon the worldwide effects of Global Warming. He completed his Doctorate at the University of Tokyo in 1997 and thereafter joined the National Institute for Environmental Studies, where he is currently the Chief of the Climate Risk Assessment Research Section at the Center for Global Environmental Research. Emori was a contributing author of the Fourth, Fifth and Sixth Assessment Reports of the Intergovernmental Panel on Climate Change (IPCC) and a member of the IPCC Steering Committee for the "Expert Meeting on New Scenarios", for which the IPCC received a Nobel Prize in 2007.

Among Emori's publications are the academic paper "Sensitivity Map of LAI to Precipitation and Surface Air Temperature Variations in a Global Scale" (co-authored with his Japan's colleague Hiroshi Kanzawa and Jiahua Zhang and Congbin Fu of the START, Institute of Atmospheric Physics in Beijing, China).
