= Special Report on Climate Change and Land =

IPCC report

The United Nations' Intergovernmental Panel on Climate Change's (IPCC) Special Report on Climate Change and Land (SRCCL), also known as the "Special Report on climate change, desertification, land degradation, sustainable land management, food security, and greenhouse gas fluxes in terrestrial ecosystems", is a landmark study from 2019 by 107 experts from 52 countries. The SRCCL provides a comprehensive overview of the entire land-climate system for the first time and decided to enlist land as a "critical resource". The IPCC's 50th session (IPCC-50) formally adopted the SRCCL's Summary for policymakers (SPM) and approved the underlying report. The SPM and the full text of Special Report on Climate Change and Land—in an unedited form—were released on 8 August 2019. The report is over 1,300 pages long and includes the work of 107 experts from 52 countries.

The report is the second of three Special Reports in the current Sixth Assessment Report (AR6) cycle which began in 2015 and will be completed in 2022. The first was Special Report on Global Warming of 1.5 °C, and the third is the Special Report on the Ocean and Cryosphere in a Changing Climate (SROCC) released on 25 September 2019. The AR6 cycle is considered by the IPCC to be their most ambitious since the panel was formed in 1988. (Note: The World Meteorological Organization (WMO) and the United Nations Environment Programme (UNEP) established the Intergovernmental Panel on Climate Change in 1988. It was endorsed later by the United Nations General Assembly. Membership is open to all members of the WMO and UN.)

== Previous IPCC assessments cycles and special reports ==
Since it was established in 1988, the IPCC provides the governments of their 195 member countries, with periodic comprehensive summaries of scientific assessments of the drivers of climate change, including current impact and potential risks. The reports also put forward possible responses in terms of adaptation and mitigation. The IPCC has published five Assessment Reports, including the 1990 IPCC First Assessment Report (FAR), the 1995 IPCC Second Assessment Report also known as Climate Change 1995, the 2001 Third Assessment Report, the IPCC Fourth Assessment Report (AR4) also known as Climate Change 2007, and the Fifth Assessment Report. Each report also includes the "full scientific and technical assessment of climate change, generally in three volumes, one for each of the Working Groups of the IPCC, together with their Summaries for Policymakers, and a Synthesis Report."

SRCCL is part of a series of Special Reports and Assessments in the sixth assessment report (AR6) cycle which began in 2015—following the election of a new Bureau—and concludes in 2022. The IPCC considers the current assessment cycle to be their most ambitious in the 30-year history of the panel. So far, during this cycle, along with the SRCCL, IPCC has published the Special Report on Global Warming of 1.5 °C in October 2018, and the May 2019 Refinement. The third in the series, the Special Report on the Ocean and Cryosphere in a Changing Climate (SROCC), is upcoming. As well, in March 2018, the IPCC held a conference in preparation for a special report on cities and climate change in the seventh assessment cycle.

Since its inception, the IPCC had also published over a dozen Special Reports which are included in the ARs. The Special report also includes a Summary for policymakers providing an "assessment of a specific issue and generally follow the same structure as a volume of an Assessment Report and Methodology Reports which are "materials that provide practical guidelines for the preparation of greenhouse gas inventories."

== Sections ==
=== SRCCL summary for policymakers (SPM) ===
"Land provides the principal basis for human livelihoods and well-being including the supply of food, freshwater and multiple other ecosystem services, as well as biodiversity. Human use directly affects more than 70%...of the global, icefree land surface... Land also plays an important role in the climate system."

— SRCCL summary for policymakers (SPM)

There are four sections in the Summary for Policymakers (SPM). The first deals with "people, land and climate in a warming world"; the second covers "adaptation and mitigation response options"; the third focuses on "enabling response options" and the fourth considers "action in the near-term". In the first section, the SPM says that human-induced land degradation—with increased consumption and population growth causing more land use for "food, feed, fibre, timber and energy"—has negatively affected ice-free land area globally. Approximately "25–30% of total food produced is lost or wasted" while "821 million people are undernourished" and "2 billion adults now being overweight or obese." In part two, the SPM says that "increased food productivity, dietary choices and food losses and waste reduction, can reduce demand for land conversion." In part 3, suggested response options that will also help eradicate poverty, include "improving access to markets, securing land tenure, factoring environmental costs into food, making payments for ecosystem services, and enhancing local and community collective action". The SPM says that, "Many sustainable land management technologies and practices are profitable within three to 10 years (medium confidence). While they can require upfront investment, actions to ensure sustainable land management can improve crop yields and the economic value of pasture. Land restoration and rehabilitation measures improve livelihood systems and provide both short-term positive economic returns and longer-term benefits in terms of climate change adaptation and mitigation, biodiversity and enhanced ecosystem functions and services."

=== Chapters ===
The SRCCL consists of seven chapters, Chapter 1: Framing and Context, Chapter 2: Land-Climate Interactions, Chapter 3: Desertification, Chapter 4: Land Degradation, Chapter 5: Food Security, Chapter 5 Supplementary Material, Chapter 6: Interlinkages between desertification, land degradation, food security and GHG fluxes: Synergies, trade-offs and Integrated Response Options, and Chapter 7: Risk management and decision making in relation to sustainable development. Like all IPCC reports, the SRCCL includes a "Summary for Policymakers",

==== Chapter 1: Framing and context ====
..."Neither our individual or societal identities, nor the world's economy would exist without the multiple resources, services and livelihood systems provided by land ecosystems and biodiversity."

— Chapter 1

In the executive summary of Chapter 1, the authors described the land area on earth as "finite" saying that sustainable land use is "fundamental for human well-being."

One of the authors of "Framing and Context", Karlsruhe Institute of Technology's Almut Arneth, told Deutsche Presse-Agentur (DPA) journalists that "The surface of the earth is limited, the population is growing, and more acreage is needed for food and for fibres that can be used for clothing."

==== Chapter 2: Land-climate interactions ====
According to the 8 August Carbon Brief in-depth article on the SRCCL, Chapter 2 provides data on livestock methane emissions, about 66% is agricultural methane" and "about 33% of global methane emissions" come from livestock.

==== Chapter 3: Desertification ====
In Chapter 3, the authors said that while climate change is exacerbating desertification, there are technologies and innovations including those based on indigenous and local knowledge (ILK), that are available and that could, if put into practice in local regions, "avoid, reduce and reverse desertification, simultaneously contributing to climate change mitigation and adaptation."

==== Chapter 4: Land degradation ====
"Unravelling the impacts of climate-related land degradation on poverty and livelihoods is highly challenging. This complexity is due to the interplay of multiple social, political, cultural, and economic factors, such as markets, technology, inequality, population growth, each of which interact and shape the ways in which social-ecological systems respond."

— Chapter 4

While the impact of land degradation on peoples' livelihoods globally is already evident, "particularly those living in vulnerable and poverty-stricken regions", the authors of chapter four do not make a clear connection between climate change and land degradation because of the multiple factors at play which include inequality, population growth, technology, and markets.

==== Chapter 5: Food security ====
"The report highlights that climate change is affecting all four pillars of food security: availability (yield and production), access (prices and ability to obtain food), utilization (nutrition and cooking), and stability (disruptions to availability)."

— IPCC press release. 8 August 2019

Climate change has had a negative impact on vegetation at the same time that we are experiencing population growth. Ice-free land is needed to maintain food security. The IPCC report authors cautioned against "converting land" to bioenergy in which energy is produced by burning vegetation instead of burning fossil fuels, and advised countries to "set limits on the amount of land" used for energy crops—biofuels and afforestation. Land use in this way means there is less soil to grow much-needed food crops. In the original draft of the summary for policymakers the warning was even more pronounced, but it was considerably watered down due to the intervention of a group of governments led by Brazil, United States, United Kingdom and Sweden.

According to Chapter 5, with extreme weather events, rising temperatures increase, and either not enough or too much rain, there is more food insecurity. In some cases, yields of maize and wheat, for example, have increased in higher altitudes while yields of the same crops have declined in regions with lower altitudes. They also discuss "climate change-induced displacement and migration" in "eight countries in Asia, Africa and Latin America." They said that in countries such as, Guatemala, Honduras, and Nicaragua where 30% of the agriculture is dependent on rainfall, food security is undermined. They cited studies that show that migration from Mexico and Central America, fluctuates in "response to climate variability". Furthermore, in these countries, the "food system is heavily dependent on maize and bean production and long-term climate change and variability significantly affect the productivity of these crops and the livelihoods of smallholder farmers."

==== Chapter 6: Interlinkages ====
"IPCC does not recommend people's diets. What we've pointed out on the basis of the scientific evidence is that there are certain diets that have a lower carbon footprint — Jim Skea."

— Jim Skea. SRCCL Facebook 8 August 2019

Chapter 6, "Interlinkages between desertification, land degradation, food security and GHG fluxes: Synergies, trade-offs and Integrated Response Options", offers pathways of mitigating the effects of global climate change on land use, such as reduced deforestation and agricultural diversification. In addition, Chapter 6 also says that a shift in consumer behaviour towards a more plant-based diet with less protein from livestock, such as cattle, "sheep, buffalo and goats" would result in lower emissions. (Note: IPCC researchers present scientific evidence on the carbon footprints of certain activities and behaviours; they do not make specific recommendations people's diets. Jim Skea.) One of the three lead authors for Chapter 6, the University of Aberdeen's environmental scientist, Pete Smith, who teaches plant and soil science, said that as growing conditions deteriorate, there will be a "massive pressure for migration." Ruminant livestock not only produce a lot of methane, a powerful greenhouse gas, but the "deforestation in critical forest systems" is caused by need for grazing land in countries such as Brazil. Smith clarified that, "We're not telling people to stop eating meat. In some places people have no other choice. But it's obvious that in the West we're eating far too much."

Rutgers University's Department of Human Ecology at the School of Environmental and Biological Sciences's associate professor, Pamela McElwee, who is one of Chapter 6's co-authors, said that "dietary change"—"particularly in developed countries of the West"—such as reducing "excess" consumption of "high-greenhouse-gas-emissions diets" high in lamb and cattle consumption is a "win-win" because it addresses both climate crisis and health problems at the same time. McElwee said that food security in a warming world is a major concern as there is potential for "food crises developing "on several continents at once," as quoted in the New York Times. Climate change can be a multiplier effect on existing problems like "rate of soil loss and land degradation" which heightens the risk of "severe food shortages." While there are a lot of actions available to combat these problems, McElwee said that "what some of these solutions do require is attention, financial support, enabling environments." The science on which the report is based shows that "increasing the productivity of land, wasting less food" and shifting diets "away from cattle and other types of meat" lowers the carbon footprint. According to an 8 August 2019 PBS NewsHour report, about 15% of current emissions could be cut by mid-century if "people change their diets, reducing red meat and increasing plant-based foods, such as fruits, vegetables and seeds." Rosenzweig added, it "would also make people more healthy."

Chapter six discusses material substitution (Note: Material substitution refers to a climate change mitigation strategy in which harvested wood products (HWPs) are used as substitutes for plastics, concrete, metal or steel which are more emission-intensive.) as it relates to sustainable long-term forest management, with more production of harvested wood products (HWPs) which have a lower carbon footprint. HWP that are used to as a substitute for metal, plastic, or concrete— which are more emissions-intensive—would also result in removing carbon dioxide (CO_{2}) from the atmosphere. In Canada, for example, Margot Hurlbert said that forest industry could increase the percentage of solid wood products that it harvests and decrease the amount of pulp and paper products.

==== Chapter 7: Risk management and decision making in relation to sustainable development ====
Risk management, which "reduces vulnerabilities in land and the food system" and increases resilience in communities, can include making dietary changes and growing a "variety of crops", which can prevent soil degradation. It also includes sharing risks, "reducing inequalities, and improving incomes." Other "ways to adapt to the negative effects of climate change, include ensuring that there is "equitable access to food" particularly in those regions where "land cannot provide adequate food".

University of Regina's Margot Hurlbert, who is also Canada Research Chair in climate change, energy and sustainability policy, is co-ordinating co-author of "Risk management and decision making in relation to sustainable development", said that, "...there's lots of opportunities to make these changes, and it's not too late." This includes using natural shade, through agroforestry, for example, to grow crops, and—in tropical climates—using biochar as a fertilizer. Hurlbert said that countries, like Canada, can "wield influence through its own use of trade conditions and policies" to "ensure imported food is grown without damaging landscapes and widening deserts overseas". Consumers, as well as organizations and governments, can use sustainability certifications when sourcing wood products and food, for example. (Note: In a 9 August 2019 interview with CBC News, Hulbert described agroforestry as "having forests that agricultural producers are also farming and living in." Examples of agroforestry include growing crops such as coffee under a forest canopy, and interspersing vegetables with fruit trees.)

== Main statements ==
"Land is where we live. Land is under growing human pressure. Land is a part of the solution. But land can't do it all."

— IPCC. 9 August 2019. Twitter

This report provided a comprehensive overview of the entire land-climate system for the first time and addressed land itself as a "critical resource".

In a 9 August United Nations video, Valerie Masson-Delmotte cited the newly released report, saying that there are currently over 500 million people who live in areas negatively affected by climate change on land transformed by land degradation or desertification. Many are forced to migrate. The international group of 107 authors urged all nations to adopt sustainable land use in order to "limit greenhouse gas emissions before it is too late" and to work together to build long-term food security systems to support farmers with programs that will help build their resilience and help them engage in the market. (Note: Valerie Masson-Delmotte is currently leading the IPCC's Working Group One's (WGI) activities for the Sixth Assessment Report (AR6) cycle. She is a senior researcher at the Laboratoire des sciences du climat et de l'environnement (LSCE, Climate and Environment Sciences Laboratory). She was elected as co-chair of IPCC WGI in October 2015, which is the group that "examines the physical science basis". Before working on the AR6, she also served on AR5 as coordinating lead author on the paleoclimate chapter.)

IPCC vice-chair and ANU Climate Institute director Mark Howden, who is one of the authors of the SRCCL, said that "the land sector is currently contributing to climate change" and better land management "would have multiple economic, environmental and health benefits" and would deliver "win-wins for farmers, communities, governments and biodiversity but also helps address climate change."

=== Contributors ===
The scientific leadership of the SRCCL included 107 experts from 52 countries as coordinating lead authors and lead authors in the three IPCC Working Groups as well as the Task Force on National Greenhouse Gas Inventories with support from the Working Group III Technical Support Unit. Fifty three percent of the authors of the report are from developing countries and forty percent of the coordinating lead authors are women.

== Reactions ==
The Economist stated that the report "fires another warning shot about the state of the planet and the way people are transforming virtually every corner of every continent. Human activities affect roughly three-quarters of Earth's ice-free land, with huge consequences for the climate." The BBC published a series of articles related to the publication of the report. Roger Harrabin, a BBC environment analyst, said that the report would "become the most authoritative report yet on the way we use and abuse the land." An 8 August 2019 article by New York Times (NYT) highlighted the facts that the SRCCL was "prepared by more than 100 experts from 52 countries" and that it found that a "half-billion people already live in places turning into desert, and soil is being lost between 10 and 100 times faster than it is forming." The NYT also pointed to the fivefold increase in migrants at the United States/Mexico border from El Salvador, Guatemala and Honduras "coinciding with a dry period that left many with not enough food." Some scientists "suggested it bears the signal of climate change." An article in The Atlantic was titled, "This Land Is the Only Land There Is". The article said that the SRCCL is a milestone because it says that ice-free land itself, which humans need for growing food, is "scarce and precious". The article pointed to some climate scientists and researchers having, prior to SRCCL, sometimes portrayed land as a "limitless" cleansing "global sponge", in the sense that replanting sufficient numbers of trees would significantly reduce the net CO_{2} burden. The Washington Post called SRCCL a "landmark study".

== See also ==
- Effects of climate change on agriculture
- Special Report on Emissions Scenarios
- Special Report on Global Warming of 1.5 °C
- Global Assessment Report on Biodiversity and Ecosystem Services
