= Martina Angela Caretta =

Geographer

- Awards: American Association of Geographers' 2020 Glenda Laws Award
- Scientific career
- Fields: Geography
- Workplaces: Lund University, West Virginia University

Martina Angela Caretta is a geographer who studies water usage and management, including its human and social impacts. Her research has an extra focus on how changes to environmental conditions and water policy disproportionately impact women. She is the coordinating lead author of the IPCC Sixth Assessment Report chapter on water.

== Early life ==
Caretta grew up in a rural part of northeast Italy, often spending time on her grandparents' sorghum farm.

== Academic work and research ==
Caretta holds a PhD in human geography from Stockholm University. She became a senior lecturer at Lund University in 2021, after previously being an assistant professor at West Virginia University from 2016 to 2020.

== Honors and awards ==
She received the American Association of Geographers' 2020 Glenda Laws Award.

== Selected publications ==
- Coordinating lead author of the chapter on water in the IPCC Sixth Assessment Report
- Author of the 2017 report for the UNESCO World Water Assessment Program
