= Low Elevation Coastal Zone =

The Low Elevation Coastal Zone (LECZ) refers to low-lying coastal areas with an elevation below a certain threshold, commonly 10 meters, above mean sea level. Globally, there is a substantial and growing population living in the Low Elevation Coastal Zone, which consists of approximately 2% of the world's land area and around 11% of the global population. The LECZ is an area of interest because it represents areas that are and will be vulnerable to impacts of flooding and sea level rise due to climate change.

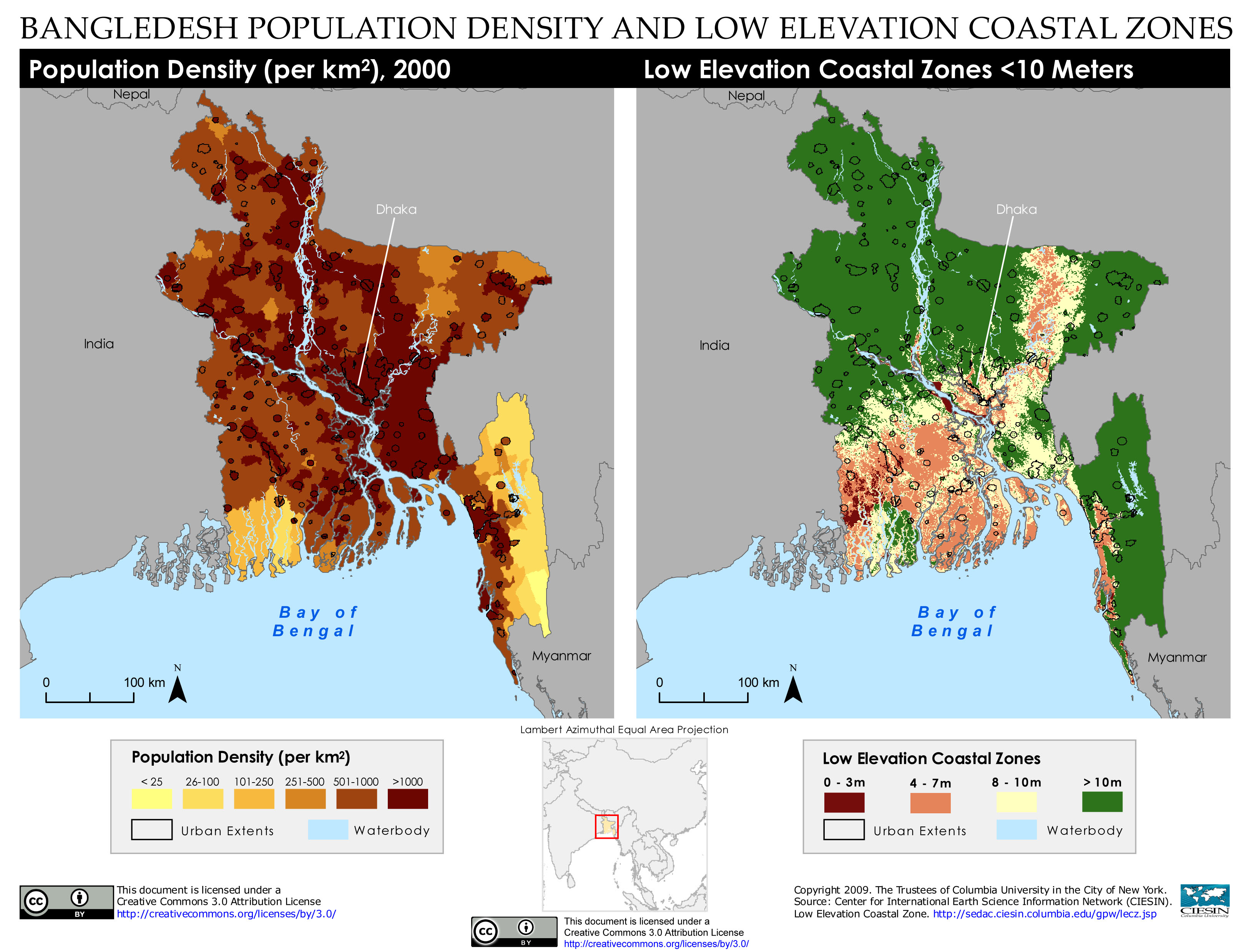
A map of the Low Elevation Coastal Zone in Bangladesh and the country's population density. Image from SEDACMaps, CC-BY-2.0.

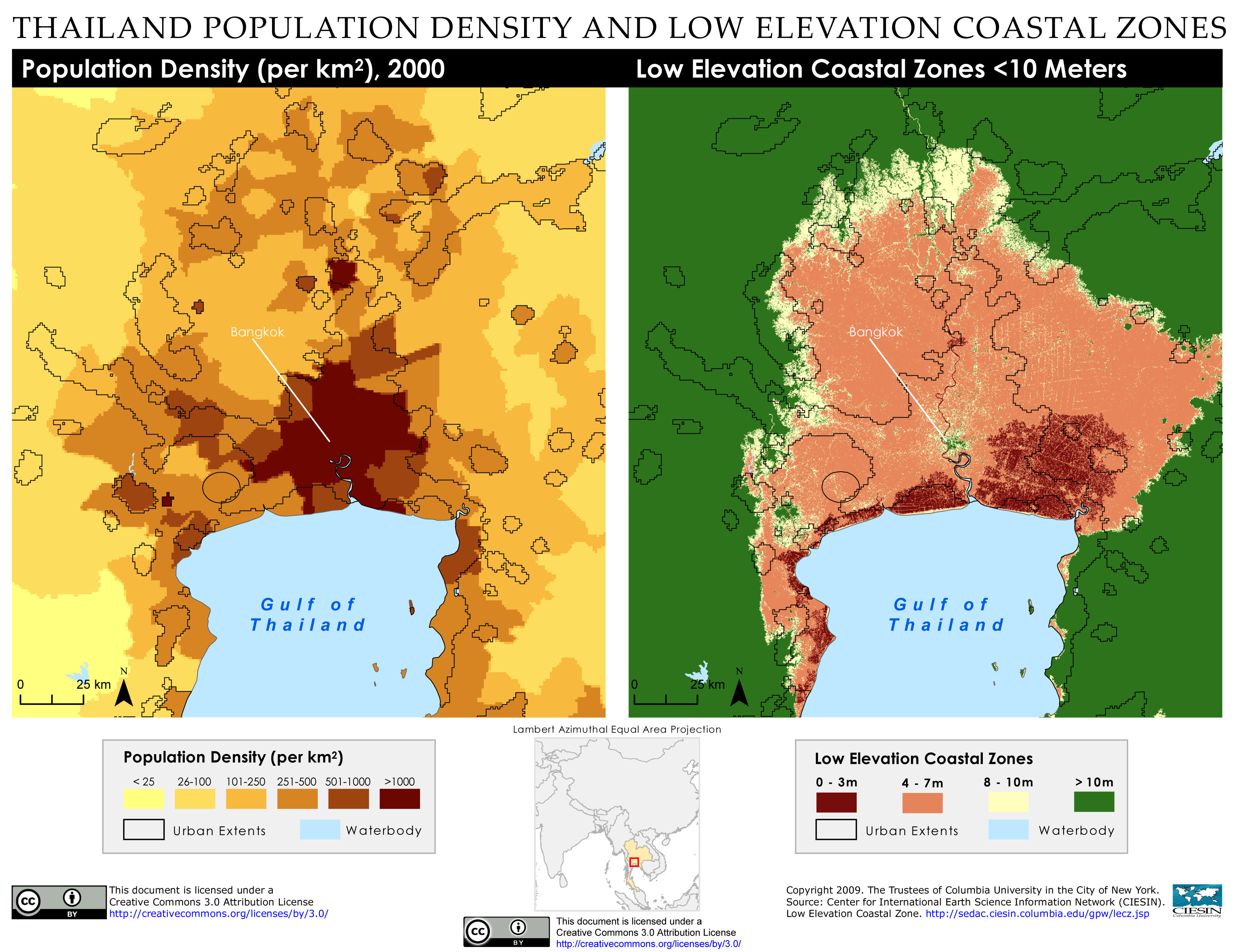
A map of the Bangkok, Thailand urban area's low elevation coastal zone and its population density. Image from SEDACMaps, CC-BY-2.0.

== Definition and Derivation ==
The term Low Elevation Coastal Zone was defined as "the contiguous area along the coast that is less than 10 metres above sea level" in a 2007 paper by McGranahan et al., although since then various elevation thresholds such as 5 meters have been used to define the LECZ for research purposes. The LECZ is derived using elevation data and also incorporates data on population density. The LECZ includes places on land with elevations below sea level, as well as areas of land that are above sea level but are below a specified threshold. It represents the population in a region that may be vulnerable to impacts of present and future flooding and sea level rise.

== Estimates of the LECZ ==
The Low Elevation Coastal Zone has been estimated and mapped for the globe as well as for many countries, territories, and cities by the Socioeconomic Data and Applications Center at Columbia University as part of NASA's Earth Observing System Data and Information System (see maps here) as well as by researchers.

The Intergovernmental Panel on Climate Change's Special Report on the Ocean and Cryosphere in a Changing Climate includes a figure (Figure CB9.1) that is a global map of low-lying islands and coasts, including the LECZ and low-lying islands.

== Population living in the LECZ ==
=== Global Population Estimates ===
The global population living in the Low Elevation Coastal Zone is substantial and growing. Estimates using 2010 and 2020 data estimate that approximately 11% of the world's population was living in low elevation areas below an elevation of 10 meters, compared to 10% based on 2000 estimates. The number of people living in the LECZ worldwide may reach 1 billion people by 2050. Based on 2000 estimates, as much as 13% of the world's urban population lives in the LECZ and most of the population in the LECZ may live in developing areas. Population growth is especially high in urban areas inside the LECZ. The urban population living in the LECZ increased by over 200 million from 1990 to 2015 according to estimates, reaching a population of about 487 million. 60% of the LECZ's population in 2015 lived in urban areas. Estimates of population living in the LECZ may vary considerably depending on which sources are used for population and elevation data, among other factors related to the elevation(s) of interest and the geographic level of detail.

=== Regional Differences ===
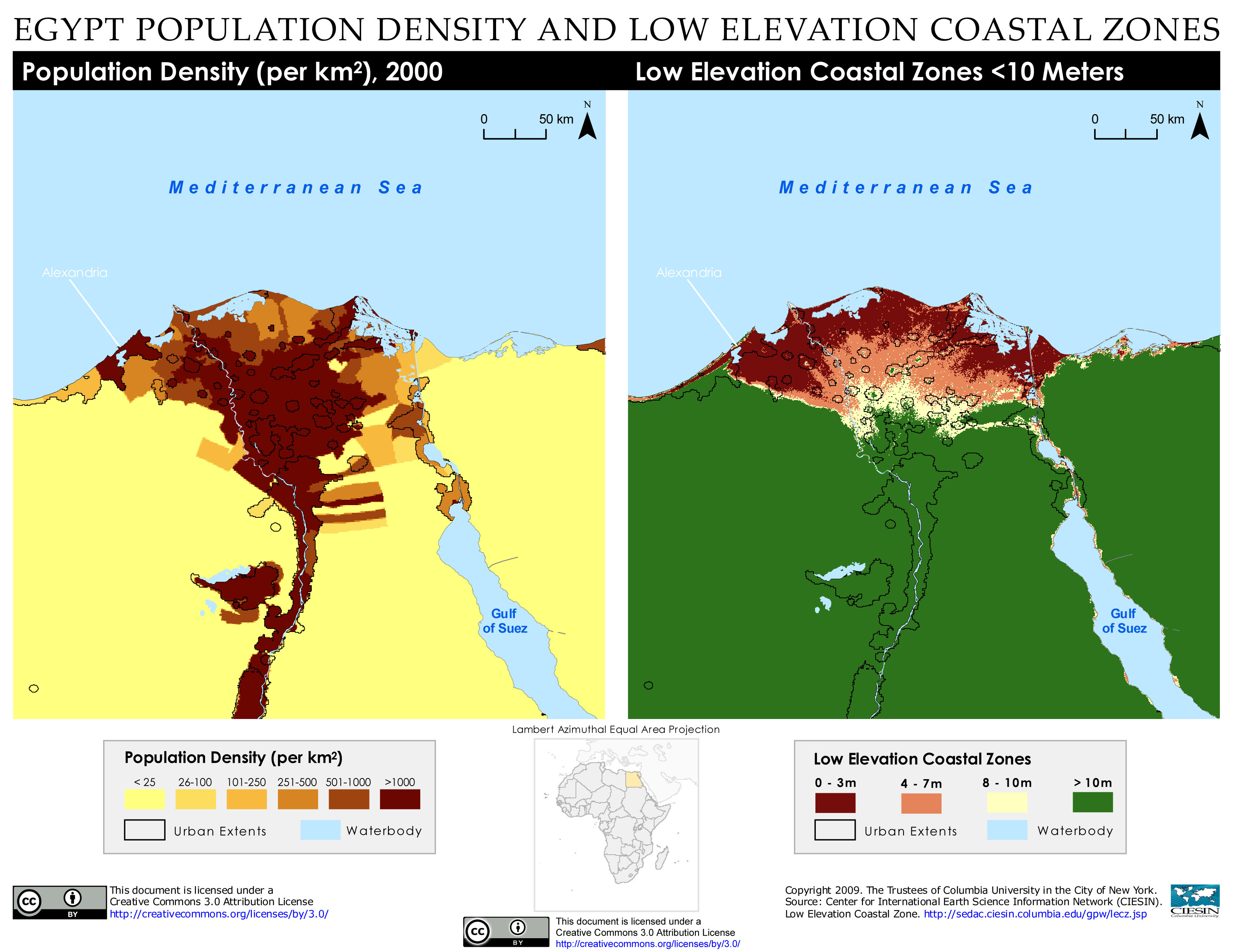
A map of the LECZ in the Nile River delta and its population density SEDACMAPS, CC-BY-2.0.

Asia contains over 70% of the LECZ's population despite having about one third of its area.12 percent of Africa's urban population lives in the LECZ even with only one percent of the continent's total land area in the zone. Latin America has the smallest share of its population in the LECZ, at 6 percent, while Asia and Australia/New Zealand top all other continents with 13 percent. Small island states also have 13 percent of their populations inside of the zone.

=== Countries with Large Populations in the LECZ ===
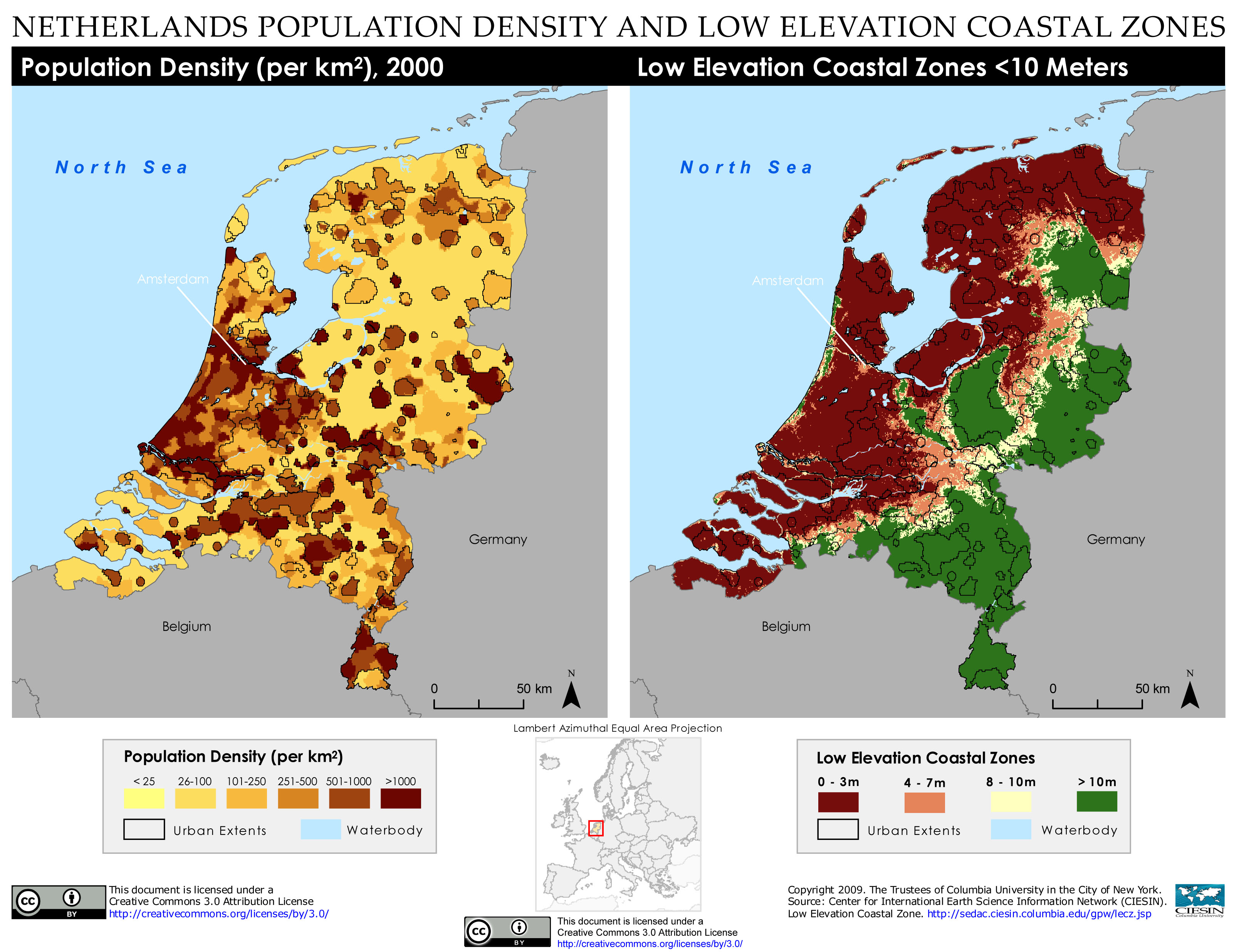
A map of the LECZ in the Netherlands and its population density SEDACMAPS, CC-BY-2.0.

Using data from 2000, the top 3 countries with the most people living in the LECZ were China, India, and Bangladesh. Many of the countries in the top ten have large overall populations, and don't necessarily have a large percentage of their populations living in the LECZ, 6 of them having below 25%. 6 of the top ten were also top ten in total population at the time, and all were in the top 20. Of the ten countries with the highest percentage of their population in the LECZ, 6 of them are small island states. The top 5 (Maldives, Marshall Islands, Tuvalu, Cayman Islands, and Turks and Caicos), all have over 90 percent of their populations inside of the LECZ, with the Maldives having 100 percent of its population in the zone. When excluding small countries, specifically those with populations under 100,000 or areas under 1000 square kilometers, the top 3 are the Bahamas, Suriname, and the Netherlands, all with over 70 percent of their population in the zone. Vietnam, Bangladesh, and Egypt are on both the top ten list in terms of total population in the LECZ and percentage share in the LECZ excluding small countries.

== Sea Level Rise ==
Current Projections of potential sea level rise by 2300. RCraig09, CC BY-SA 4.0

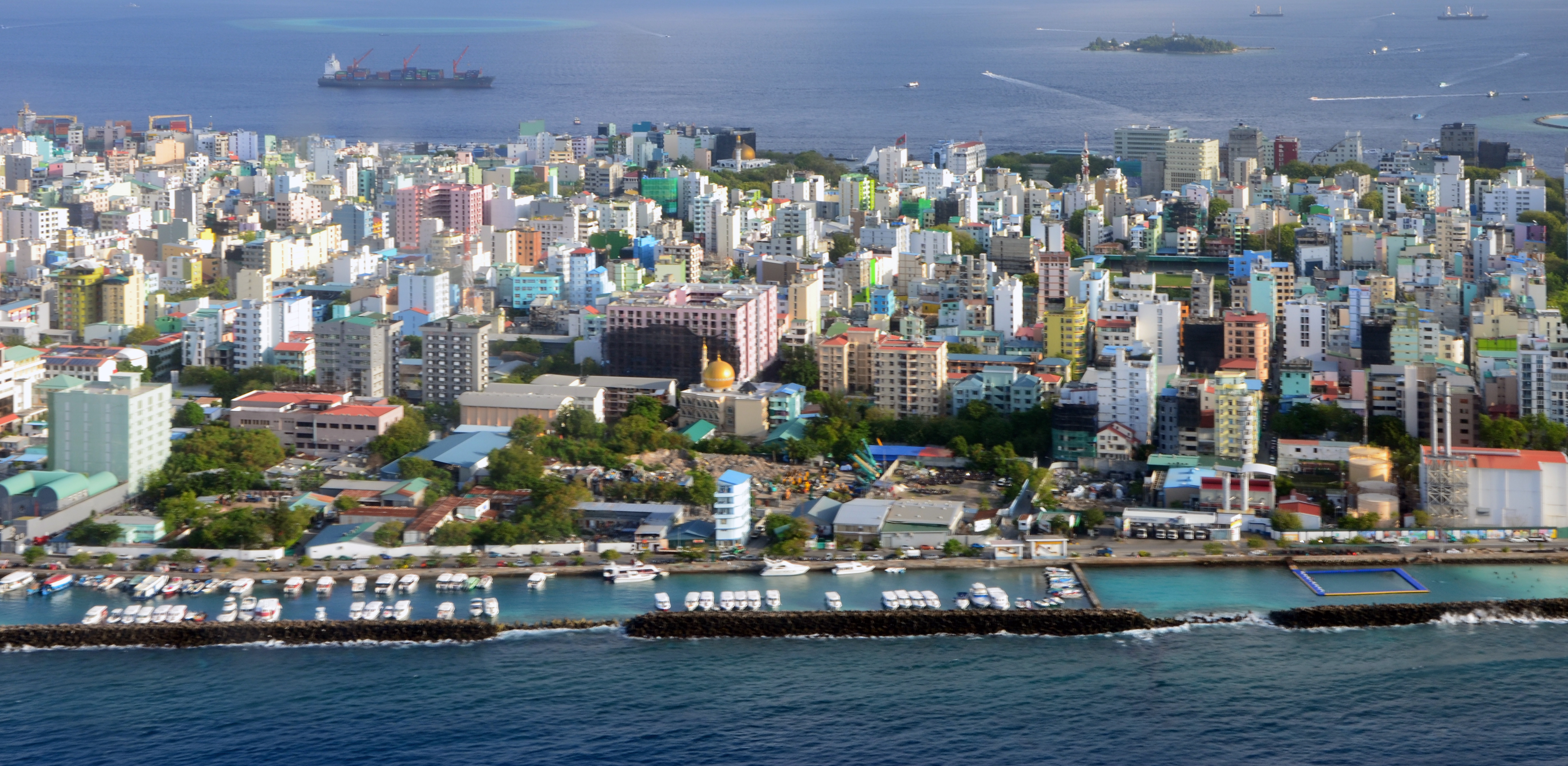
Malé, the capital of the Maldives. Gzzz, CC BY-SA 4.0 file

Low Elevation Coastal Zones are especially vulnerable to the effects of sea level rise, coastal erosion, and flooding. Under the RCP8.5 high emissions scenario, sea level is expected to rise between 0.61-1.1 meters by 2100. Sea level rise will have substantial economic impacts on areas in the LECZ, affecting tourism, fishing, agriculture, and many other industries. Subsidence and coastal erosion, as well as natural disasters like tropical cyclones are expected to exacerbate these effects. Economic losses in the world's 136 largest coastal cities are expected to increase from 6 billion USD$ per year currently to 1 trillion per year by 2050 due to coastal flooding. Flooding in these cities has the potential to have larger impacts on the economies of the countries they are located in and the larger global market, as these cities are important hubs for trade and transportation.

Certain areas in the LECZ may be more vulnerable to sea level rise due to socioeconomic factors and may not have the resources of large cities to adapt. Small islands, deltas, and arctic coasts may be especially susceptible. Over 90% of the world's rural poor population live inside the LECZ's of 15 developing nations. Many populations inside the LECZ may have to relocate, and relocation has already begun on a small scale in Fiji and the Solomon Islands.
