= Renewable Energy Sources and Climate Change Mitigation =

2011 book by Ottmar Edenhofer

- Author: Ottmar Edenhofer; Intergovernmental Panel on Climate Change
- Subject: Climate change mitigation, renewable energy
- Publisher: Cambridge University Press
- Publication date: May 9, 2011
- ISBN: 9789291691319
- OCLC: 776940700

The United Nations Intergovernmental Panel on Climate Change (IPCC) published a special report on Renewable Energy Sources and Climate Change Mitigation (SRREN) on May 9, 2011. The report developed under the leadership of Ottmar Edenhofer evaluates the global potential for using renewable energy to mitigate climate change. This IPCC special report provides broader coverage of renewable energy than was included in the IPCC's 2007 climate change assessment report, as well as stronger renewable energy policy coverage.

In the present time, there is an obvious trend to have more renewable energy sources and therefore to overcome life crisis that can go when oil and gas expire. Renewable energy can contribute to "social and economic development, energy access, secure energy supply, climate change mitigation, and the reduction of negative environmental and health impacts". Under favourable circumstances, cost savings in comparison to non-renewable energy use exist.

== History ==
Previously the IPCC examined both renewable energy and energy efficiency in its fourth assessment report, published in 2007, but members decided that renewable energy commercialization merits additional in-depth coverage because of its importance in reducing carbon emissions.

The outline of the IPCC WG III's Special Report on Renewable Energy Sources and Climate Change Mitigation (SRREN) was approved at the IPCC Plenary in Budapest in April, 2008. The final report was approved at the 11th session of the IPCC Working Group III, May 2011, in Abu Dhabi. The SRREN addresses the information needs of policy makers, private sector and civil society in a comprehensive way and will provide valuable information for further IPCC publications, including the upcoming IPCC 5th Assessment Report. The SRREN was released for publication on May 9, 2011.

The Special Report "aims to provide a better understanding and broader information on the mitigation potential of renewable energy sources: technological feasibility, economic potential and market status, economic and environmental costs&benefits, impacts on energy security, co-benefits in achieving sustainable development, opportunities and synergies, options and constraints for integration into the energy supply systems and in the societies".

== Main findings ==
Renewable energy can contribute to "social and economic development, energy access, secure energy supply, climate change mitigation, and the reduction of negative environmental and health impacts".

In the report, the IPCC said "as infrastructure and energy systems develop, in spite of the complexities, there are few, if any, fundamental technological limits to integrating a portfolio of renewable energy technologies to meet a majority share of total energy demand in locations where suitable renewable resources exist or can be supplied". Under favourable circumstances, cost savings in comparison to non-renewable energy use exist. IPCC scenarios "generally indicate that growth in renewable energy will be widespread around the world". The IPCC said that if governments were supportive, and the full range of renewable technologies were deployed, renewable energy could account for almost 80% of the world's energy supply within four decades. Rajendra Pachauri, chairman of the IPCC, said the necessary investment in renewables would cost only about 1% of global GDP annually. This approach could keep greenhouse gas concentrations to less than 450 parts per million, the safe level beyond which climate change becomes catastrophic and irreversible.

== See also ==
- IPCC 4th Assessment Report (AR4)
- IPCC Fifth Assessment Report (AR5)
- IPCC Summary for Policymakers
- IRENA
- Renewable energy commercialization
- REN21
- List of books about renewable energy
