= IPCC Sixth Assessment Report =

Intergovernmental report on climate change

The Sixth Assessment Report (AR6) of the United Nations (UN) Intergovernmental Panel on Climate Change (IPCC) is the sixth in a series of reports which assess the available scientific information on climate change. Three Working Groups (WGI, II, and III) covered the following topics: The Physical Science Basis (WGI); Impacts, Adaptation and Vulnerability (WGII); Mitigation of Climate Change (WGIII). Of these, the first study was published in 2021, the second report February 2022, and the third in April 2022. The final synthesis report was finished in March 2023. It served as the scientific foundation for the first Global Stocktake at the 2023 United Nations Climate Change Conference (COP28) and remains the primary baseline for international climate policy and the 2025–2026 revision of Nationally Determined Contributions.

The first of the three working groups published its report on 9 August 2021, Climate Change 2021: The Physical Science Basis. A total of 234 scientists from 66 countries contributed to this first working group (WGI) report. The authors built on more than 14,000 scientific papers to produce a 3,949-page report, which was then approved by 195 governments. The Summary for Policymakers (SPM) document was drafted by scientists and agreed to line-by-line by the 195 governments in the IPCC during the five days leading up to 6 August 2021.

In the report, there are guidelines for both responses in the near term and in the long-term. According to the report, the main source of the increase in global warming is due to the increase in CO_{2} emissions, stating that it is likely or very likely to exceed 1.5 °C under higher emission scenarios.

According to the WGI report, it is only possible to avoid warming of 1.5 °C (2.7 °F) or 2.0 °C (3.6 °F) if massive and immediate cuts in greenhouse gas emissions are made. The Guardian described the report as "its starkest warning yet" of "major inevitable and irreversible climate changes", a theme echoed by many newspapers as well as political leaders and activists around the world.

== Production ==
In April 2016, at the 43rd session which took place in Nairobi, Kenya, the topics for three Special Reports (SR) and one methodology report on Greenhouse Gases (GHG) inventories in the AR6 assessment cycle were decided. These reports were completed in the interim phase since the finalisation of the Fifth Assessment Report and the publication of results from the Sixth Assessment Report.

=== Structure ===
The sixth assessment report is made up of the reports of three working groups (WG I, II, and III) and a synthesis report which concluded the assessment in early 2023.

- The Physical Science Basis of Climate Change in August 2021 (WGI contribution)
- Impacts, Adaptation and Vulnerability in February 2022 (WGII contribution)
- Mitigation of Climate Change in April 2022 (WGIII contribution)
- Synthesis Report in March 2023

=== Geopolitics ===
Geopolitics has been included in climate models for the first time, in the form of five Shared Socioeconomic Pathways: SSP1 "Taking the Green Road", SSP2 "Middle of the Road", SSP3 "A Rocky Road", SSP4 "A Road Divided", and SSP5 "Taking the Highway", which have been published in 2016.

Those pathways assume that international cooperation and worldwide increase in GDP will facilitate adaptation to climate change. The geopolitical pathways served as one of the sources for the formation of the Shared Socioeconomic Pathways in the report among with other sources. One of the assumptions is that enough GDP and technology derived from fossil fuels development will permit to adapt even to 5.0 °C (9.0 °F) temperature rise. Some experts assume, that while the odds for a worst-case scenario (5 °C) and the best base-case (1.5 °C) today seem lower, the most plausible outcome is around 3.0 °C (5.4 °F).

=== Special reports during same assessment cycle ===
Sequence of release dates of special IPCC reports during the same assessment cycle:

- Special Report on Global Warming of 1.5 °C (SR15) in October 2018
  - 2019 Refinement to the 2006 IPCC Guidelines for National Greenhouse Gas Inventories in May 2019
- Special Report on Climate Change and Land (SRCCL) in August 2019
- Special Report on the Ocean and Cryosphere in a Changing Climate (SROCC) in September 2019

== Working Group 1 report (physical science basis) ==
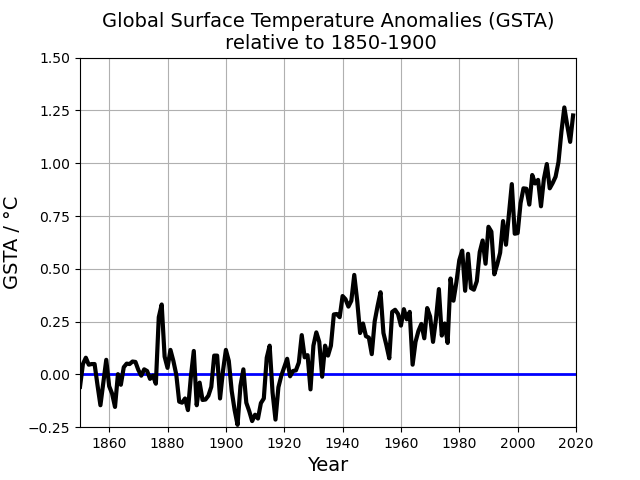
Variation of annual observed global average temperature (1850–2019) relative to the 1850–1900 average (blue line), as reported in the Summary for Policymakers (SPM)

A total of 234 scientists from 66 countries contributed to the first of three working group reports. Working group 1 (WGI) published Climate Change 2021: The Physical Science Basis. The report's authors built on more than 14,000 scientific papers to produce a 3,949-page report, which was then approved by 195 governments. The Summary for Policymakers (SPM) document was drafted by scientists and agreed to line-by-line by the 195 governments in the IPCC during the five days leading up to 6 August 2021. It was published on Monday, 9 August 2021.

According to the report, it is only possible to avoid warming of 1.5 °C or 2 °C if massive and immediate cuts in greenhouse gas emissions are made. In a front-page story, The Guardian described the report as "its starkest warning yet" of "major inevitable and irreversible climate changes", a theme echoed by many newspapers around the world.

The Technical Summary (TS) provides a level of detail between the Summary for Policymakers (SPM) and the full report. In addition, an interactive atlas was made "for a flexible spatial and temporal analysis of both data-driven climate change information and assessment findings in the report".

=== Important findings of WG 1 report ===
The Working Group 1 (WGI) report, Climate Change 2021: The Physical Science Basis comprises thirteen chapters and is focused on the foundational consensus of the climate science behind the causes and effects of human greenhouse gas emissions. Compared with previous assessments, the report included much more detail on the regional effects of climate change, although more research is needed on climate change in eastern and central North America. Sea-level rise by 2100 is likely to be from half to one metre, but two to five metres is not ruled out, as ice sheet instability processes are still poorly understood. It also covers current research into past increases in global temperatures, reaffirming and extending the hockey stick graph temperature reconstructions to cover the 2,000 years prior to 2000. and relates them to observed instrumental records 1850-2020. It concludes that current warming is unprecedented in more than 2,000 years, and that this was the warmest multi-century period in more than 100,000 years.

The report quantifies climate sensitivity as between 2.5 °C (4.5 °F) and 4.0 °C (7.2 °F) for each doubling of carbon dioxide in the atmosphere, while the best estimate is 3 °C. In all the represented Shared Socioeconomic Pathways the temperature reaches the 1.5 °C warming limit, at least for some period of time in the middle of the 21st century. However, Joeri Rogelj, director of the Grantham Institute and a lead IPCC author, said that it is possible to completely avoid warming of 1.5 °C, but to achieve that the world would need to cut emissions by 50% by the year 2030 and by 100% by the year 2050. If the world does not begin to drastically cut emissions by the time of the next report of the IPCC, then it will no longer be possible to prevent 1.5 °C of warming. SSP1-1.9 is a new pathway with a rather low radiative forcing of 1.9 W/m^{2} in 2100 to model how people could keep warming below the 1.5 °C threshold. But, even in this scenario, the global temperature peaks at 1.6 °C in the years 2041–2060 and declines after.

Shared Socioeconomic Pathways in the IPCC Sixth Assessment Report
SSP	Scenario	Estimated warming (2041–2060)	Estimated warming (2081–2100)	Very likely range in °C (2081–2100)
SSP1-1.9	very low GHG emissions: CO_{2} emissions cut to net zero around 2050	1.6 °C	1.4 °C	1.0 – 1.8
SSP1-2.6	low GHG emissions: CO_{2} emissions cut to net zero around 2075	1.7 °C	1.8 °C	1.3 – 2.4
SSP2-4.5	intermediate GHG emissions: CO_{2} emissions around current levels until 2050, then falling but not reaching net zero by 2100	2.0 °C	2.7 °C	2.1 – 3.5
SSP3-7.0	high GHG emissions: CO_{2} emissions double by 2100	2.1 °C	3.6 °C	2.8 – 4.6
SSP5-8.5	very high GHG emissions: CO_{2} emissions triple by 2075	2.4 °C	4.4 °C	3.3 – 5.7

The IPCC Sixth report did not estimate the likelihoods of the scenarios.

In 2020, a commentary described SSP5–8.5 as highly unlikely, SSP3–7.0 as unlikely, and SSP2–4.5 as likely.

In January 2025, a revised assessment by Hausfather estimated median warming under current policies at about 2.7 °C by 2100, with the 5th–95th percentile of central estimates spanning 2.3–3.0 °C; including emissions and climate-system uncertainties widens the range to roughly 1.9–3.7 °C. The paper also states that current-policy emissions pathways tend to align most closely with, or fall slightly below, SSP2-4.5 rather than SSP3-7.0.

The AR6 analysis puts the probable temperature rise in the middle of the scenario spectrum that ranges from 1.5 °C to 5 °C, at about 3 °C at the end of the century. It is likely that 1.5 °C will be reached before 2040. The threats from compound impacts are rated higher than in previous IPCC reports.

Extreme weather is expected to increase in line with temperature, and compound effects (such as heat and drought together) may impact more on society. The report includes a major change from previous IPCC in the ability of scientists to attribute specific extreme weather events.

The global carbon budget to keep below 1.5 °C is estimated at 500 billion more tonnes of greenhouse gas, which would need the whole world to be net zero before 2050. Staying within this budget, if counting from the beginning of the year 2020, gives a 50% chance to stay below 1.5 °C. For having a 67% chance, the budget is 400 billion tonnes and for an 83% chance it is 300 billion tonnes. The report says that rapidly reducing methane emissions is very important, to make short-term gains to buy time for carbon dioxide emission cuts to take effect.

Any future warming will increase the occurrence of extreme weather events. Even in a 1.5 °C temperature rise there will be "an increasing occurrence of some extreme events unprecedented in the observational record". The likelihood of more rare events increases more.

The frequency, and the intensity of such events will considerably increase with warming, as described in the following table:

Increase in frequency and intensity of extreme events with global warming
Name of event	Climate in 1850–1900	1 °C warming	1.5 °C warming	2 °C warming	4 °C warming
1 in 10 years heatwave	Normal	2.8 times more often, 1.2 °C hotter	4.1 times more often, 1.9 °C hotter	5.6 times more often, 2.6 °C hotter	9.4 times more often, 5.1 °C hotter
1 in 50 years heatwave	Normal	4.8 times more often, 1.2 °C hotter	8.6 times more often, 2.0 °C hotter	13.9 times more often, 2.7 °C hotter	39.2 times more often, 5.3 °C hotter
1 in 10 years heavy precipitation event	Normal	1.3 times more often, 6.7% wetter	1.5 times more often, 10.5% wetter	1.7 times more often, 14.0% wetter	2.7 times more often, 30.2% wetter
1 in 10 years drought	Normal	1.7 times more often, 0.3 sd drier	2.0 times more often, 0.5 sd drier	2.4 times more often, 0.6 sd drier	4.1 times more often, 1.0 sd drier

Increase in frequency of extreme events with global warming in the Sixth Assessment Report's Summary for Policymakers

== Working Group 2 report (impacts, adaptation and vulnerability) ==
The second part of the report, a contribution of working group II (WGII), was published on 28 February 2022. Entitled Climate Change 2022: Impacts, Adaptation & Vulnerability, the full report is 3675 pages, plus a 37-page summary for policymakers. It contains information on the impacts of climate change on nature and human activity. Topics examined included biodiversity loss, migration, risks to urban and rural activities, human health, food security, water scarcity, and energy. It also assesses ways to address these risks and highlights how climate resilient development can be part of a larger shift towards sustainability.

The report was published during the first week of the 2022 Russian invasion of Ukraine. In the context of the conflict, the Ukrainian delegation connected the Russian aggression to the global dependency on oil, and a Russian official, Oleg Anisimov, apologized for the conflict despite the possible repercussions. The Ukrainian delegation also called for news reporting on the war not to overshadow the WGII report.

=== Important findings of WG 2 report ===
The report found that climate impacts are at the high end of previous estimates, with all parts of the world being affected. At least 3.3 billion people, about 40% of the world population, now fall into the most serious category of "highly vulnerable", with the worst effects in the developing world. If emissions continue on their current path, Africa will lose 30% of its maize cultivation territory and 50% of its land cultivated for beans. One billion people face flooding due to sea level rise. Climate change, together with other factors, also increases the risk of infectious diseases outbreaks like the COVID-19 pandemic. The report also cites evidence that China will pay the highest financial cost if the temperature continue to rise. The impacts will include food insecurity, water scarcity, flooding, especially in coastal areas where most of the population lives due to higher than average sea level rise, and more powerful cyclones. At some point part of the country may face wet-bulb temperatures higher than humans and other mammals can tolerate more than six hours. Overall, the report identified 127 different negative impacts of climate change, some of them irreversible.

People can protect themselves to some degree from the effects of climate change, which is known as adaptation. Overall, progress on adaptation has been made in all sectors and regions, although this progress is unevenly distributed and many initiatives prioritise immediate risks over longer-term transformational changes. Still, there are feasible and effective adaptation options available and many adaption actions have benefits beyond reducing climate risks, including positive effects on the Sustainable Development Goals. For example, the majority of current adaptations address water-related risks; adaptations like improved water management, water storage and irrigation reduce vulnerability and can also provide economic and ecological benefits. Similarly, adaptation actions like agroforestry, farm- and landscape diversification and urban agriculture can increase food availability, while at the same time improving sustainability.

The report further highlighted the need for conservation in order to maintain biodiversity, and mitigate the effects of climate change. The report reads, "Recent analyses, drawing on a range of lines of evidence, suggest that maintaining the resilience of biodiversity and ecosystem services at a global scale depends on effective and equitable conservation of approximately 30% to 50% of Earth's land, freshwater and ocean areas, including currently near-natural ecosystems." The report was critical of technological approaches to carbon dioxide removal, instead indicating that urbanisation could help drive adoption of mitigation strategies such as public transport and renewable energy. The report also warns there are high risks associated with strategies such as solar radiation management; planting forests in unnatural locations; or "poorly implemented bioenergy, with or without carbon capture and storage".

In line with the emphasis on adaptation limits, the report also highlights loss and damage, meaning negative consequences of climate change that cannot be avoided through adaptation. The report states that such losses and damages are already widespread: droughts, floods and heatwaves are becoming more frequent, and a mass extinction is already underway. Taking near-term actions to limit warming to below 1.5 °C would substantially reduce future losses and damages, but cannot eliminate them all. Previously, rich countries have resisted taking responsibility for these losses.

The report states that even a temporary overshoot of the 1.5 degree limit will lead to negative effects on humans and ecosystems. According to the report: "Depending on the magnitude and duration of overshoot, some impacts will cause release of additional greenhouse gases (medium confidence) and some will be irreversible, even if global warming is reduced (high confidence)". Climate resilient development will be more difficult if the global temperature will rise by 1.5 degrees above pre-industrial levels, while if it will rise by more than 2 degrees it will become impossible "in some regions and sub-regions".

Although the report's outlook is bleak, its conclusion argues that there is still time to limit warming to 1.5 °C (2.7 °F) by drastic cuts to greenhouse gas emission, but such action must be taken immediately. Moreover, climate resilient development can have both adaptation and mitigation benefits, but it requires international cooperation and collaborations with local communities and organisations.

== Working Group 3 report (mitigation of climate change) ==
The report was presented on 4 April 2022. Some observers are worried that the conclusions might be watered down, considering the way the reports are adopted. According to The Observer, some countries "have sought to make changes that would weaken the final warnings".

=== Important findings of WG 3 report ===
The report uses some new approaches like to include different social aspects, the participation of youth, indigenous people, cities, businesses in the solution. It states that "International cooperation is a critical enabler for achieving ambitious climate change mitigation goals." For preventing global temperature from rising more than 2 degrees above the preindustrial level, international cooperation needs to be much stronger than now as many developing countries need support from other countries higher than present for strong climate action.

According to the report demand side mitigation measures can reduce GHG emissions by 40–70% by the year 2050 compared to scenarios in which countries will fulfill its national pledges given before 2020. For being implemented successfully those measures should be linked "with improving basic wellbeing for all".

The report concluded that in order to achieve net zero emissions, it is necessary to employ carbon dioxide removal technologies, stating "All global pathways that limit warming to 1.5 °C ... with no or limited overshoot, and those that limit warming to 2 °C... involve rapid and deep and in most cases immediate GHG emission reductions in all sectors. Modelled mitigation strategies to achieve these reductions include transitioning from fossil fuels without CCS to very low- or zero-carbon energy sources, such as renewables or fossil fuels with CCS, demand side measures and improving efficiency, reducing non-CO_{2} emissions, and deploying carbon dioxide removal (CDR) methods to counterbalance residual GHG emissions". The report compares different methods of carbon dioxide removal (CDR) including agroforestry, reforestation, blue carbon management, restoration of peatland and others.

Cities have great potential for reducing greenhouse gas emissions. With full scale mitigation action the emissions of cities could be brought down to near zero, with the worst-case scenario assuming a non-mitigatable remainder of 3 GtCO_{2}-eq. City planning, supporting mixed use of space, transit, walking, cycling and sharing vehicles can reduce urban emissions by 23–26%. Urban forests, lakes and other blue and green infrastructure can reduce emissions directly and indirectly (e.g. by reducing the energy demand for cooling).

Buildings emitted 21% of global GHG emissions in the year 2019. 80–90% of their emissions can be cut while helping to achieve other Sustainable Development Goals. The report introduces a new scheme for reducing GHG emissions in buildings: SER = Sufficiency, Efficiency, Renewable. Sufficiency measures do not need very complex technology, energy supply, maintenance or replacement during the life of the building. Those include, natural ventilation, green roofs, white walls, mixed use of spaces, collective use of devices etc. Reducing GHG emissions from buildings is linked to sharing economy and circular economy.

The IPCC found that decent living standards could be achieved using less energy than prior consensus assumed. According to the report for reaching well being for all, the required energy consumption is "between 20 and 50 GJ cap-1 yr-1 depending on context." More equitable income distribution can lower emissions. Mitigation pathways based on low demand and high efficiency can achieve decent living standards and well being for all. Pathways based on reducing consumption, involving sustainable development have less negative outcomes than pathways based on high consumption and narrow mitigation. According to table TS30, narrow mitigation can increase habitat loss by 600%, while avoiding habitat degradation by around 95%. Mitigation with sustainable development did not harm forest cover and biodiversity.

The report mentions some improvement in global climate action. For example, the rate of deforestation slowed after 2010 and the total forest cover increased in the latest years due to reforestation in Europe, Asia and North America.

== Reactions to all three working group reports ==
=== In science ===
The publication of the Working Group 1 report in 2021 was during the Northern Hemisphere summer, where there was much extreme weather, such as a Western North America heat wave, flooding in Europe, extreme rainfall in India and China, and wildfires in several countries. Some scientists are describing these extreme weather events as clear gaps in the models used for writing the report, with the lived experience proving more severe than the consensus science.

=== In politics ===
After publication of the Working Group 1 report, EU Vice President Frans Timmermans said that it is not too late to prevent runaway climate change. UK Prime Minister Boris Johnson said that the next decade will be pivotal to the future of the planet.

Rick Spinrad, administrator of the US's National Oceanic and Atmospheric Administration, stated that his agency "will use the new insights from this IPCC report to inform the work it does with communities to prepare for, respond to, and adapt to climate change".

The United States special presidential envoy for climate, John Kerry, said about the Working Group 2 report: "We have seen the increase in climate-fuelled extreme events, and the damage that is left behind – lives lost and livelihoods ruined. The question at this point is not whether we can altogether avoid the crisis – it is whether we can avoid the worst consequences."

=== NGOs and activists ===
Swedish climate activist Greta Thunberg said that the Working Group 1 report "confirms what we already know from thousands [of] previous studies and reports – that we are in an emergency".

Environmentalist Inger Andersen commented: "Nature can be our saviour ... but only if we save it first."

=== In media ===
In a front-page story, dedicated to the report The Guardian described the Working Group 1 report as the "starkest warning yet" of "major inevitable and irreversible climate changes". This message was echoed by many media channels after the release of the report.

The Working Group 3 report found that there is no evidence that sustainable development requires fossil fuels. Climate journalist Amy Westervelt reacting to the report, described this finding as one of the most radical, debunking a common refrain by energy poverty advocates, that development requires use of fossil fuels.

=== From the United Nations ===
The Secretary-General of the UN, António Guterres, called the report of Working Group 1 a "code red for humanity". Responding to the Working Group 2 report, he called it "an atlas of human suffering and a damning indictment of failed climate leadership" and "the facts are undeniable ... the world's biggest polluters are guilty of arson of our only home." He also said that the report of Working Group 3 described "litany of broken climate promises [by policy makers]" and in his remarks called for more action, saying "Climate activists are sometimes depicted as dangerous radicals. But, the truly dangerous radicals are the countries that are increasing the production of fossil fuels."

== Synthesis report for all three working group reports ==
The synthesis report which summarises the entire document was finalised at the 58th plenary meeting of the panel at Interlaken in March 2023 and was published on 20 March 2023. It includes a summary for policymakers and was the basis for the 2023 United Nations Climate Change Conference (COP28) in Dubai.

In the report, there are guidelines for both responses in the near term and in the long-term. According to the report, the main source of the increase in global warming is due to the increase in CO_{2} emissions, stating that it is likely or very likely to exceed 1.5 °C under higher emission scenarios.

The panel published a longer report, a summary for policymakers a presentation and a short "Headline Statements" document. Some key example headline statements include:

- "Human activities, principally through emissions of greenhouse gases, have unequivocally caused global warming, with global surface temperature reaching 1.1°C above 1850–1900 in 2011–2020. Global greenhouse gas emissions have continued to increase, with unequal historical and ongoing contributions arising from unsustainable energy use, land use and land-use change, lifestyles and patterns of consumption and production across regions, between and within countries, and among individuals."
- "Continued greenhouse gas emissions will lead to increasing global warming, with the best estimate of reaching 1.5°C in the near term in considered scenarios and modelled pathways. Every increment of global warming will intensify multiple and concurrent hazards (high confidence). Deep, rapid, and sustained reductions in greenhouse gas emissions would lead to a discernible slowdown in global warming within around two decades, and also to discernible changes in atmospheric composition within a few years (high confidence)."
- "Climate change is a threat to human well-being and planetary health (very high confidence). There is a rapidly closing window of opportunity to secure a liveable and sustainable future for all (very high confidence)."

== Society and culture ==
=== Leaks ===
During the preparation of the three main AR6 reports, a small group of scientists leaked some information on the results of Working Group III (Mitigation of Climate Change) through the organization Scientist Rebellion. As governments can change the summaries for policymakers (SPM) for IPCC reports, the scientists were afraid that politicians might dilute this information in the summary. According to the leaked information, humanity should cut GHG emissions by 50% by 2030 and completely by 2050 in order to limit warming to 1.5 °C (2.7 °F). These efforts require strong changes in lifestyle and economy.

=== Lack of participation from Global South scholars ===
Like other major international scientific processes, the IPCC has been accused of not sufficiently including scholars from the Global South. For example, some aspects of the production can prevent African scholars from participating, such as publication requirements and being an expert reviewer before joining the panel of contributors.
