= Hiroshi Kanzawa =

Hiroshi Kanzawa (born January 1953 in Maebashi, Gunma Prefecture, Japan) is a Japanese meteorologist, environmental scientist, and the retired vice dean of the Graduate School of Environmental Studies at the University of Nagoya. He is perhaps best known for his onsite atmospheric work in Antarctica and the papers he has co-authored on Ozone depletion, including: "Large stratospheric sudden warming in Antarctic late winter and shallow ozone hole in 1988" (with Sadao Kamaguchi) and "Sensitivity Map of LAI to Precipitation and Surface Air Temperature Variations in a Global Scale" (co-authored with his Japanese colleague Seita Emori and Jiahua Zhang and Congbin Fu of the START, Institute of Atmospheric Physics in Beijing, China). Kanzawa also sits on the board of Councilors of the Hydrospheric Atmospheric Research Center at the University of Nagoya.
