= Advisory Group on Greenhouse Gases =

The Advisory Group on Greenhouse Gases, created in 1986, was an advisory body for the review of studies into the greenhouse effect. The group was created by the International Council of Scientific Unions, the United Nations Environment Programme, and the World Meteorological Organization to follow up on the recommendations of the International conference of the Assessment of the role of carbon dioxide and of other greenhouse gases in climate variations and associated impacts, held at Villach, Austria, in October 1985.

The seven-member panel included Swedish meteorologist Bert Bolin and Canadian climatologist Kenneth Hare.

The group held its last meeting in 1990. It was gradually replaced by the Intergovernmental Panel on Climate Change.
