= IPCC Second Assessment Report =

The Second Assessment Report (SAR) of the Intergovernmental Panel on Climate Change (IPCC), published in 1995, is an assessment of the then available scientific and socio-economic information on climate change. The report was split into four parts: a synthesis to help interpret UNFCCC article 2, The Science of Climate Change (Working Group I), Impacts, Adaptations and Mitigation of Climate Change (WG II), Economic and Social Dimensions of Climate Change (WG III). Each of the last three parts was completed by a separate Working Group (WG), and each has a Summary for Policymakers (SPM) that represents a consensus of national representatives.

The SPM of the WG I report contains the following statements: Greenhouse gas concentrations have continued to increase; anthropogenic aerosols tend to produce negative radiative forcings; climate has changed over the past century (air temperature has increased by between 0.3 and 0.6 °C since the late 19th century; this estimate has not significantly changed since the 1990 report); The balance of evidence suggests a discernible human influence on global climate (considerable progress since the 1990 report in distinguishing between natural and anthropogenic influences on climate, because of: including aerosols; coupled models; pattern-based studies). Climate is expected to continue to change in the future (increasing realism of simulations increases confidence; important uncertainties remain but are taken into account in the range of model projections). Finally, the report stated that there were still many uncertainties (estimates of future emissions and biogeochemical cycling; models; instrument data for model testing, assessment of variability, and detection studies).

== Overview ==
The Second Assessment Report, titled Climate Change 1995, consists of reports from each of the three Working Groups, and a Synthesis Report:

- Report of Working Group I: The Science of Climate Change (IPCC SAR WG1 1995).
- Report of Working Group II: Impacts, Adaptations and Mitigation of Climate Change: Scientific-Technical Analyses (IPCC SAR WG2 1995).
- Report of Working Group III: Economic and Social Dimensions of Climate Change (IPCC SAR WG3 1995).
- The "Full Report", consisting of Synthesis of Scientific-Technical Information Relevant to Interpreting Article 2 of the UN Framework Convention on Climate Change, and the Summaries for Policymakers from the three Working Group reports (IPCC SAR SYR 1995).

These reports were prepared by over two thousand experts, and "contain the factual basis of the issue of climate change, gleaned from available expert literature and further carefully reviewed by experts and governments."

The Synthesis Report gave its purpose as providing the scientific, technical and socio-economic information for determining

what concentrations of greenhouse gases might be regarded as "dangerous anthropogenic interference with the climate system" and the charting of a future which allows for economic development which is sustainable.

== Conclusions ==
Working Group I, dealing with the scientific aspects of climate, stated that

carbon dioxide remains the most important contributor to anthropogenic forcing of climate change; projections of future global mean temperature change and sea level rise confirm the potential for human activities to alter the Earth's climate to an extent unprecedented in human history; and the long time-scales governing both the accumulation of greenhouse gases in the atmosphere and the response of the climate system to those accumulations, means that many important aspects of climate change are effectively irreversible.

Working Group I subsequently characterized its reports in the First and Second Assessments as progressing from an understanding that the greenhouse effect is well understood, greenhouse gases are increasing (due largely to human activity), and therefore should lead to significant global warming (though lack of understanding limited specific regional predictions), to a greater understanding (despite continuing uncertainties) that global warming continues and is most likely due to human activity, and that very substantial cuts in emissions would be required to stabilize greenhouse gas concentrations.

Working Group II assessed whether the range of plausible impacts of global warming constitutes dangerous anthropogenic interference with the climate system, while Working Group III provided information to help countries "take decisions they believe are most appropriate for their specific circumstances".

== Chapter 8: Detection of Climate Change and Attribution of Causes ==
In the IPCC process, a "convening lead author" for each chapter worked with other lead authors and contributing authors to agree the structure of the chapter, and assign teams of scientists to write each section of the chapter, producing a draft which was subject to acceptance by the whole author group. Participating governments then provided review comments on the draft, incorporated into the assessment which was presented to seek acceptance at a plenary session of the IPCC.

The IPCC chairman Bert Bolin had difficulty finding a convening lead author for Chapter 8. After delays, Benjamin D. Santer who was doing postdoctoral research on the topic was persuaded to take on the task. Twenty participants from various countries met at the initial meeting in Livermore, California, in August 1994 to identify the scientific topic areas, and discussion continued by email. At the first drafting session (in Sigtuna, Sweden, in October) Santer persuaded the others that the chapter should discuss observational and model uncertainties, though these were also covered in other chapters. The "zeroth" draft was then sent out for peer review to scientific topic experts, all the chapter authors and lead authors of other chapters. Their responses were incorporated in the second drafting session in March 1995 at Brighton. In May the entire draft Working Group I report as well as the summary for policymakers was submitted for full "country review" by participating governments, to provide comments for incorporation at the third drafting session at Asheville, North Carolina, in July. Because of the delayed timing, Santer did not receive government comments for this meeting, some did not arrive until the plenary meeting in November.

The Chapter 8 draft report put together on 5 October had an Executive Summary of the evidence, and after various qualifications, said "Taken together, these results point towards a human influence on climate." Governments at the November plenary meeting in Madrid demanded changes to how this was worded in the Summary for Policymakers, after extended discussions Bolin suggested the adjective "discernible" and this was agreed. The approved Summary for Policymakers includes a section headed "The balance of evidence suggests a discernible human influence on global climate", setting out progress in detection and attribution studies, cautioning that "Our ability to quantify the human influence on global climate is currently limited because the expected signal is still emerging from the noise of natural variability, and because there are uncertainties in key factors." Santer was subsequently required by the IPCC to bring the rest of the chapter into compliance with this wording. The summary at the start of the accepted version of the chapter stated that "these results indicate that the observed trend in global mean temperature over the past 100 years is unlikely to be entirely natural in origin. More importantly, there is evidence of an emerging pattern of climate response to forcings by greenhouse gases and sulphate aerosols in the observed climate record. Taken together, these results point towards a human influence on global climate." The final paragraph in the chapter stated "The body of statistical evidence in Chapter 8, when examined in the context of our physical understanding of the climate system, now points to a discernible human influence on global climate." An introductory preface to the SAR written by IPCC chairman Bolin and his co-chairs John T. Houghton and L. Gylvan Meira Filho highlighted "that observations suggest 'a discernible human influence on global climate', one of the key findings of this report, adds an important new dimension to discussion of the climate issue."

Prior to the publication of the Second Assessment Report, the industry group Global Climate Coalition distributed a report entitled "The IPCC: Institutionalized Scientific Cleansing" to reporters, US Congressmen, and scientists, which said that Santer had altered the text, after acceptance by the Working Group, and without approval of the authors, to strike content characterizing the uncertainty of the science. Three weeks later, and a week after the Second Assessment Report was released, the Global Climate Coalition was echoed in a letter published in The Wall Street Journal from the retired condensed matter physicist and former president of the US National Academy of Sciences, Frederick Seitz, chair of the George C. Marshall Institute and Science and Environmental Policy Project, but not a climatologist. In this letter, Seitz alleged that Santer had perpetrated "a disturbing corruption of the peer-review process." Seitz criticized the conclusions of Chapter 8, and wrote that "key changes were made after the scientists had met and accepted what they thought was the final peer-reviewed version", deleting "hints of the skepticism" he attributed to other unnamed scientists.

The position of the lead author of Chapter 8, Benjamin D. Santer, was supported by fellow IPCC authors and senior figures of the American Meteorological Society (AMS) and University Corporation for Atmospheric Research (UCAR). The presidents of the AMS and UCAR stated that there was a "systematic effort by some individuals to undermine and discredit the scientific process that has led many scientists working on understanding climate to conclude that there is a very real possibility that humans are modifying Earth's climate on a global scale."

Other rebuttals of Seitz's comments include a 1997 paper by Paul Edwards and IPCC author Stephen Schneider, and a 2007 complaint to the UK broadcast regulator Ofcom about the television programme, "The Great Global Warming Swindle". The 2007 complaint includes a rebuttal of Seitz's claims by the former IPCC chairman, Bert Bolin.

== Debate over value of a statistical life ==
One of the controversies of the Second Assessment Working Group III report is the economic valuation of human life, which is used in monetized (i.e., converted into US dollar values) estimates of climate change impacts. Often in these monetized estimates, the health risks of climate change are valued so that they are "consistent" with valuations of other health risks. There are a wide range of views on monetized estimates of climate change impacts. The strengths and weaknesses of monetized estimates are discussed in the SAR and later IPCC assessments.

In the preparation of the SAR, disagreement arose over the Working Group III Summary for Policymakers (SPM). The SPM is written by a group of IPCC authors, who then discuss the draft with government delegates from all of the UNFCCC Parties (i.e., delegates from most of the world's governments). The economic valuation of human life (referred to by economists as the "value of statistical life") was viewed by some governments (such as India) as suggesting that people living in poor countries are worth less than people living in rich countries. David Pearce, who was a lead author of the relevant chapter of the SAR, officially dissented on the SPM. According to Pearce:

The relevant chapter [of the Report] values of statistical life based on actual studies in different countries ... What the authors of Chapter 6 did not accept, and still do not accept, was the call from a few [government] delegates for a common valuation based on the highest number for willingness to pay.

In other words, a few government delegates wanted "statistical lives" in poor countries to be valued at the same level as "statistical lives" in rich countries. IPCC author Michael Grubb later commented:

Many of us think that the governments were basically right. The metric [used by Pearce] makes sense for determining how a given government might make tradeoffs between its own internal projects. But the same logic fails when the issue is one of damage inflicted by some countries on others: why should the deaths inflicted by the big emitters—principally the industrialised countries—be valued differently according to the wealth of the victims' countries?

== See also ==
- Scientific opinion on climate change
