= Bert Bolin =

Swedish meteorologist (1925–2007)

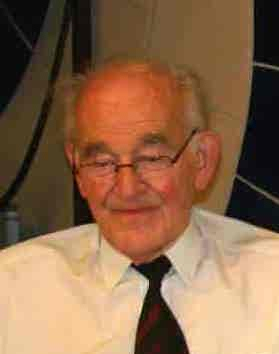
- Bolin in 2006
- Born: 15 May 1925; Nyköping, Sweden
- Died: 30 December 2007 (aged 82); Österskär, Sweden
- Education: Uppsala University, Stockholm University
- Known for: First chairman of the IPCC
- Scientific career
- Institutions: Stockholm University, European Space Research Organisation

Bert Rickard Johannes Bolin (Swedish: [ˈbæʈː bʊˈliːn]; 15 May 1925 – 30 December 2007) was a Swedish meteorologist who served as the first chairman of the Intergovernmental Panel on Climate Change (IPCC), from 1988 to 1997. He was professor of meteorology at Stockholm University from 1961 until his retirement in 1990.

== Background ==
Bolin was born in Nyköping, Sweden and graduated from Uppsala University in 1946. He earned a master's degree in 1949 and a doctorate in 1956, both in meteorology, at Stockholm University. During his doctorate he spent a year in 1950 at the Institute for Advanced Study in Princeton, New Jersey, where he worked with Jule Charney, John von Neumann and others on the first computerized weather forecast, using ENIAC, the first electronic computer.

Bolin's marriage to Ulla Frykstrand ended in divorce in 1979; they had three children: Dan, Karina and Göran. Bolin resided in Österskär, northeast of Stockholm where he also died aged 82. He remained active until shortly before his death.

== Career and awards ==
Bolin was professor of meteorology at Stockholm University 1961–1990, and involved in international climate research cooperation from the 1960s. Bolin was involved in organising use of the new satellite tools for climate research, which led to the formation of the ICSU Committee on Atmospheric Sciences (CAS) in 1964, with Bolin becoming its first chairman. CAS started the Global Atmospheric Research Programme (GARP) in 1967, which Bolin also chaired; GARP became the World Climate Research Programme in 1980.

Bolin served on the Advisory Group on Greenhouse Gases from 1985. In 1987, the 500-page Brundtland Report which Bolin was involved with contributed to the setting up of the Intergovernmental Panel on Climate Change (IPCC). Under his chairmanship (from 1988 to 1997), the IPCC produced its First Assessment Report (1990) and Second Assessment Report (1995), contributing to the IPCC sharing the 2007 Nobel Peace Prize with former US vice president Al Gore. Bolin was asked to accept the Prize on behalf of the IPCC, but was too ill to attend. Bolin is credited with bringing together a diverse range of views among the panel's 3,500 scientists into something resembling a consensus. The first report led to the United Nations Framework Convention on Climate Change, and the second to the Kyoto Protocol.

He has been scientific director of the European Space Research Organisation (now known as European Space Agency). He was co-founder of Stockholm Environment Institute in 1988 and chairman of its board in the 1990s as well as special advisor on climate and energy.

He received many awards and honors for his work in climate research, including the International Meteorological Organization Prize (1981), Carl-Gustaf Rossby Research Medal (1984), the Tyler Prize for Environmental Achievement (1988), the highest atmospheric science award of the American Meteorological Society, Körber European Science Prize (1990), the Milutin Milankovic Medal in 1993, and the Blue Planet Prize (1995), often considered as the Nobel Prize for environmental sciences. He also jointly received the Global Environment Facility's 1999 Global Environment Leadership Award. Bolin was a member of the Swedish, Norwegian (from 1975) and Russian Academies of Sciences.

In November 2007, shortly before his death, Bolin published the partly autobiographical A History of the Science and Politics of Climate Change: The Role of the Intergovernmental Panel on Climate Change. The Bolin Centre for Climate Research at Stockholm University was named in his memory in 2008.

Political offices
Preceded by none	Chairman of the IPCC; 1988–1997	Succeeded by Robert Watson
