= Special Report on the Ocean and Cryosphere in a Changing Climate =

2019 IPCC report

Cover of IPCC SROCC

The United Nations' Intergovernmental Panel on Climate Change's (IPCC) Special Report on the Ocean and Cryosphere in a Changing Climate (SROCC) is a report about the effects of climate change on the world's seas, sea ice, icecaps and glaciers. It was approved at the IPCC's 51st Session (IPCC-51) in September 2019 in Monaco. The SROCC's approved Summary for Policymakers (SPM) was released on 25 September 2019. The 1,300-page report by 104 authors and editors representing 36 countries referred to 6,981 publications. The report is the third in the series of three Special Reports in the current Sixth Assessment Report (AR6) cycle, which began in 2015 and was completed in 2022. The first was the Special Report on Global Warming of 1.5 °C, while the second was the Special Report on Climate Change and Land (SRCCL), also known as the "Special Report on climate change, desertification, land degradation, sustainable land management, food security, and greenhouse gas fluxes in terrestrial ecosystems", which was released on 7 August 2019.

== Main statements ==
=== SROCC summary for policymakers ===
"This highlights the urgency of prioritising timely, ambitious, coordinated and enduring action."

— SRCCL summary for policymakers (SPM)

In its Summary for Policymakers (SPM), the report said that, since 1970, the "global ocean has warmed unabated" and "has taken up more than 90% of the excess heat in the climate system." The rate of ocean warming has "more than doubled" since 1993. Marine heatwaves are increasing in intensity and since 1982, they have "very likely doubled in frequency". Surface acidification has increased as the oceans absorb more CO_{2}. Ocean deoxygenation "has occurred from the surface to 1,000 m (3,300 ft)."

=== Rising sea levels ===
Global mean sea levels (GMSL) rose by 3.66 mm (0.144 in) per year which is "2.5 times faster than the rate from 1900 to 1990". At the rate of acceleration, it "could reach around 30 cm (12 in) to 60 cm (24 in) by 2100 even if greenhouse gas emissions are sharply reduced and global warming is limited to well below 2 °C, but around 60 cm (24 in) to 110 cm (43 in) if emissions continue to increase strongly. In their summary of the SROCC, Carbon Brief said that rate of rising sea levels is "unprecedented" over the past century. Worst-case projections are higher than thought and a 2 metres (6.6 ft) rise by 2100 "cannot be ruled out", if greenhouse gas emissions continue to increase strongly."

=== Ocean deoxygenation ===
The viability of species is being disrupted throughout the ocean food web due to changes in ocean chemistry. As the ocean warms, mixing between water layers decreases, resulting in less oxygen and nutrients being available for marine life.

=== Meridional overturning circulation in the Atlantic ===
Chapter 6 which deals with ..., Atlantic meridional overturning circulation (AMOC) "will very likely weaken over the 21st century" but it is unlikely that AMOC will collapse. A weakening of AMOC would result in "a decrease in marine productivity in the North Atlantic, more winter storms in Europe, a reduction in Sahelian and South Asian summer rainfall, a decrease in the number of tropical cyclones in the Atlantic, and an increase in regional sea-level around the Atlantic especially along the northeast coast of North America." Carbon Brief described AMOC as "the system of currents in the Atlantic Ocean that brings warm water up to Europe from the tropics. It is driven by the formation of North Atlantic Deep Water – the sinking of cold, salty water in the high latitudes of the North Atlantic."

=== Melting glaciers ===
There has been an acceleration of glaciers melting in Greenland and Antarctica as well as in mountain glaciers around the world, from 2006 to 2015. This now represents a loss of 720 billion tons (653 billion metric tons) of ice a year.

=== Ice sheets ===
Carbon Brief said that the melting of Greenland's ice sheets is "unprecedented in at least 350 years." The combined melting of Antarctic and Greenland ice sheets has contributed "700% more to sea levels" than in the 1990s.

=== Arctic sea ice decline ===
The Arctic Ocean could be ice free in September "one year in three" if global warming continues to rise to 2 °C. Prior to industrialization, it was only "once in every hundred years".

=== Global marine animal biomass and fish catch decline ===
"Since about 1950 many marine species across various groups have undergone shifts in geographical range and seasonal activities in response to ocean warming, sea ice change and biogeochemical changes, such as oxygen loss, to their habitats."

— SRCCL summary for policymakers (SPM)

In "Chapter 5: Changing Ocean, Marine Ecosystems, and Dependent Communities", the authors warn that marine organisms are being affected by ocean warming with direct impacts on human communities, fisheries, and food production. The Times said that it is likely that there will be a 15% decrease in the number of marine animals and a decrease of 21% to 24% in the "catches by fisheries in general" by the end of the 21st century because of climate change.

=== Decline of snow and lake ice cover ===
In "Chapter 3: Polar Regions", the authors reported that there has been a decline of snow and lake ice cover. From 1967 to 2018, the extent of snow in June decreased at a rate of "13.4 ± 5.4% per decade".

=== Thawing permafrost ===
Future climate-induced changes to permafrost "will drive habitat and biome shifts, with associated changes in the ranges and abundance of ecologically-important species." As permafrost soil melts, there is a possibility that carbon will be unleashed. The permafrost soil carbon pool is much "larger than carbon stored in plant biomass". "Expert assessment and laboratory soil incubation studies suggest that substantial quantities of C (tens to hundreds Pg C) could potentially be transferred from the permafrost carbon pool into the atmosphere under the Representative Concentration Pathway (RCP) 8.5" projection.

=== Low-lying islands and coasts ===
In the final section on low-lying islands and coasts (LLIC), the report says that cities and megacities—including New York City, Tokyo, Jakarta, Mumbai, Shanghai, Lagos And Cairo—are "at serious risk from climate-related ocean and cryosphere changes." If emissions remain high, some low-lying islands are likely to become "uninhabitable" by the end of the 21st century. Low lying areas including islands and the Low Elevation Coastal Zone were estimated have approximately 625 million people living in them based on 2000 estimates, with most in "non-developed contexts."

== Reactions ==
The New York Times headlined their 25 September article with "We're All in Big Trouble". According to the Times, "Sea levels are rising at an ever-faster rate as ice and snow shrink, and oceans are getting more acidic and losing oxygen." The article cited Princeton University's Michael Oppenheimer, who was one of the report's lead authors who said that, "The oceans and the icy parts of the world are in big trouble, and that means we're all in big trouble, too. The changes are accelerating." IPCC Working Group I Co-Chair, Valérie Masson-Delmotte, was quoted as saying in Monaco, that "Climate change is already irreversible. Due to the heat uptake in the ocean, we can't go back."

The BBC headline referred to a red alert on the Blue Planet.

The Economist said that the "world's oceans are getting warmer, stormier and more acidic. They are becoming less productive as the ecosystems within them collapse. Melting glaciers and ice sheets are causing sea levels to rise, increasing the risk of inundation and devastation to hundreds of millions of people living in coastal areas."

PBS NewsHour cited National Oceanic and Atmospheric Administration's (NOAA) Ko Barrett, who is also a vice chair of IPCC, saying, "Taken together, these changes show that the world's ocean and cryosphere have been taking the heat for climate change for decades. The consequences for nature are sweeping and severe."

The Atlantic called it a blockbuster report.

National Geographic said that according to the report, "These challenges are only going to get worse unless countries make lightning-fast moves to eliminate greenhouse gas emissions... But strong, decisive action could still forestall or evade some of the worst impacts."

== See also ==
- Effects of climate change on oceans
