= IPCC Fifth Assessment Report =

Intergovernmental report on climate change in 2014

Average IPCC AR5 climate model projections for 2081–2100 relative to 1986–2005, under low and high emission scenarios

The Fifth Assessment Report (AR5) of the United Nations Intergovernmental Panel on Climate Change (IPCC) is the fifth in a series of such reports and was completed in 2014. As had been the case in the past, the outline of the AR5 was developed through a scoping process which involved climate change experts from all relevant disciplines and users of IPCC reports, in particular representatives from governments. Governments and organizations involved in the Fourth Report were asked to submit comments and observations in writing with the submissions analysed by the panel. Projections in AR5 are based on "Representative Concentration Pathways" (RCPs). The RCPs are consistent with a wide range of possible changes in future anthropogenic greenhouse gas emissions. Projected changes in global mean surface temperature and sea level are given in the main RCP article.

The IPCC Fifth Assessment Report followed the same general format as the Fourth Assessment Report, with three Working Group reports and a Synthesis report. The report was delivered in stages, starting with the report from Working Group I in September 2013. It reported on the physical science basis, based on 9,200 peer-reviewed studies. The Synthesis Report was released on 2 November 2014, in time to pave the way for negotiations on reducing carbon emissions at the UN Climate Change Conference in Paris during late 2015.

The report's Summary for Policymakers stated that warming of the climate system is 'unequivocal' with changes unprecedented over decades to millennia, including warming of the atmosphere and oceans, loss of snow and ice, and sea level rise. Greenhouse gas emissions, driven largely by economic and population growth, have led to greenhouse gas concentrations that are unprecedented in at least the last 800,000 years. These, together with other anthropogenic drivers, are "extremely likely" (where that means more than 95% probability) to have been the dominant cause of the observed global warming since the mid-20th century.

Conclusions of the fifth assessment report are summarized below:

- Working Group I: "Warming of the climate system is unequivocal, and since the 1950s, many of the observed changes are unprecedented over decades to millennia". "Atmospheric concentrations of carbon dioxide, methane, and nitrous oxide have increased to levels unprecedented in at least the last 800,000 years". Human influence on the climate system is clear. It is extremely likely (95–100% probability) that human influence was the dominant cause of global warming between 1951 and 2010.
- Working Group II: "Increasing magnitudes of [global] warming increase the likelihood of severe, pervasive, and irreversible impacts". "A first step towards adaptation to future climate change is reducing vulnerability and exposure to present climate variability". "The overall risks of climate change impacts can be reduced by limiting the rate and magnitude of climate change"
- Working Group III: Without new policies to mitigate climate change, projections suggest an increase in global mean temperature in 2100 of 3.7 to 4.8 °C, relative to pre-industrial levels (median values; the range is 2.5 to 7.8 °C including climate uncertainty). "(T)he current trajectory of global annual and cumulative emissions of GHGs is not consistent with widely discussed goals of limiting global warming at 1.5 to 2 degrees Celsius above the pre-industrial level." Pledges made as part of the Cancún Agreements are broadly consistent with cost-effective scenarios that give a "likely" chance (66–100% probability) of limiting global warming (in 2100) to below 3 °C, relative to pre-industrial levels.

== Current status ==
Global Emissions by Economic Sector

The Fifth Assessment Report (AR5) consists of three Working Group (WG) Reports and a Synthesis Report. The first Working Group Report was published in 2013 and the rest were completed in 2014. The summaries for policy makers were released on 27 September 2013 for the first report, on 31 March 2014 for the second report entitled "Impacts, Adaptation, and Vulnerability", and on 14 April 2014 for the third report entitled "Mitigation of Climate Change".

- WG I: The Physical Science Basis – 30 September 2013, Summary for Policymakers published 27 September 2013.
- WG II: Impacts, Adaptation and Vulnerability – 31 March 2014
- WG III: Mitigation of Climate Change – 15 April 2014
- AR5 Synthesis Report (SYR) – 2 November 2014

The AR5 provides an update of knowledge on the scientific, technical and socio-economic aspects of climate change.

More than 800 authors, selected from around 3,000 nominations, were involved in writing the report. Lead authors' meetings and a number of workshops and expert meetings, in support of the assessment process, were held. A schedule of AR5 related meetings, review periods, and other important dates was published.

A key statement of the report was that:

Continued emission of greenhouse gases will cause further warming and long-lasting changes in all components of the climate system, increasing the likelihood of severe, pervasive and irreversible impacts for people and ecosystems. Limiting climate change would require substantial and sustained reductions in greenhouse gas emissions which, together with adaptation, can limit climate change risks.

== Authors and editors ==
The IPCC was established in 1988 by the World Meteorological Organization (WMO) and the United Nations Environment Programme (UNEP) to assess scientific, technical and socio-economic information concerning climate change, its potential effects and options for adaptation and mitigation.

In March 2010, the IPCC received approximately 3,000 author nominations from experts around the world. At the bureau session held in Geneva, 19–20 May 2010, the three working groups presented their selected authors and review editors for the AR5. Each of the selected scientists, specialists and experts was nominated in accordance with IPCC procedures, by respective national IPCC focal-points, by approved observer organizations, or by the bureau. The IPCC received 50% more nominations of experts to participate in AR5 than it did for AR4. A total of 559 authors and review editors had been selected for AR4 from 2,000 proposed nominees. On 23 June 2010 the IPCC announced the release of the final list of selected coordinating lead authors, comprising 831 experts who were drawn from fields including meteorology, physics, oceanography, statistics, engineering, ecology, social sciences and economics. In comparison to the Fourth Assessment Report (AR4), participation from developing countries was increased, reflecting the ongoing efforts to improve regional coverage in the AR5. About 30% of authors came from developing countries or economies in transition. More than 60% of the experts chosen were new to the IPCC process, bringing fresh knowledge and perspectives.

== Climate change 2013: report overview ==
On 23 June 2010, the IPCC announced the release of the final list of selected coordinating lead authors, comprising 831 experts. The working group reports would be published during 2013 and 2014. These experts would also provide contributions to the Synthesis Report published in late 2014.

The Fifth Assessment Report (Climate Change 2013) would be released in four distinct sections:

- Working Group I Report (WGI): Focusing on the physical science basis and including 258 experts.
- Working Group II Report (WGII): Assessing the impacts, adaptation strategies and vulnerability related to climate change and involving 302 experts.
- Working Group III Report (WGIII): Covering mitigation response strategies in an integrated risk and uncertainty framework and its assessments carried out by 271 experts.
- The Synthesis Report (SYR): Final summary and overview.

=== Working group I contribution ===
The full text of Climate Change 2013: The Physical Science Basis was released in an unedited form on Monday, 30 September 2013. It was over 2,000 pages long and cited 9,200 scientific publications. The full, edited report was released online in January 2014 and published in physical form by Cambridge University Press later in the year.

==== Summary for Policymakers ====
A concise overview of Working Group I's findings was published as the Summary for Policymakers on 27 September 2013. The level of confidence in each finding was rated on a confidence scale, qualitatively from very low to very high and, where possible, quantitatively from exceptionally unlikely to virtually certain (determined based on statistical analysis and expert judgement).

Likelihood scale used in the report
Term	Likelihood of the outcome
Virtually certain	99–100 % probability
Extremely likely	95–100 % probability
Very likely	90–100 % probability
Likely	66–100 % probability
More likely than not	50–100 % probability
About as likely as not	33 to 66% probability
Unlikely	0–33 % probability
Very unlikely	0–10 % probability
Extremely unlikely	0–5 % probability
Exceptionally unlikely	0–1 % probability

The principal findings were:

===== General =====
- Warming of the atmosphere and ocean system is unequivocal. Many of the associated impacts such as sea level change (among other metrics) have occurred since 1950 at rates unprecedented in the historical record.
- There is a clear human influence on the climate
- It is extremely likely that human influence has been the dominant cause of observed warming since 1950, with the level of confidence having increased since the fourth report.
- IPCC pointed out that the longer we wait to reduce our emissions, the more expensive it will become.

===== Historical climate metrics =====
- It is likely (with medium confidence) that 1983–2013 was the warmest 30-year period for 1,400 years.
- It is virtually certain the upper ocean warmed from 1971 to 2010. This ocean warming accounts, with high confidence, for 90% of the energy accumulation between 1971 and 2010.
- It can be said with high confidence that the Greenland and Antarctic ice sheets have been losing mass in the last two decades and that Arctic sea ice and Northern Hemisphere spring snow cover have continued to decrease in extent.
- There is high confidence that the sea level rise since the middle of the 19th century has been larger than the mean sea level rise of the prior two millennia.
- Concentration of greenhouse gases in the atmosphere has increased to levels unprecedented on earth in 800,000 years.
- Total radiative forcing of the earth system, relative to 1750, is positive and the most significant driver is the increase in CO_{2}'s atmospheric concentration.

===== Models =====
This video presents projections of 21st century temperature and precipitation patterns based on a buildup of greenhouse gases with a combined effect equivalent to 650ppm of atmospheric CO_{2}, a scenario the IPCC called "RCP4.5". The changes shown compare the model projections to the average temperature and precipitation benchmarks observed from 1971 to 2000.

Climate model simulations in support of AR5 use a different approach to account for increasing greenhouse gas concentrations than in the previous report. Instead of the scenarios from the Special Report on Emissions Scenarios the models are performing simulations for various Representative Concentration Pathways.

AR5 relies on the Coupled Model Intercomparison Project Phase 5 (CMIP5), an international effort among the climate modeling community to coordinate climate change experiments. Most of the CMIP5 and Earth System Model (ESM) simulations for AR5 WRI were performed with prescribed CO_{2} concentrations reaching 421 ppm (RCP2.6), 538 ppm (RCP4.5), 670 ppm (RCP6.0), and 936 ppm (RCP 8.5) by the year 2100. (IPCC AR5 WGI, page 22).

- Climate models have improved since the prior report.
- Model results, along with observations, provide confidence in the magnitude of global warming in response to past and future forcing.

===== Projections =====
- Further warming will continue if emissions of greenhouse gases continue.
- The global surface temperature increase by the end of the 21st century is likely to exceed 1.5 °C relative to the 1850 to 1900 period for most scenarios, and is likely to exceed 2.0 °C for many scenarios
- The global water cycle will change, with increases in disparity between wet and dry regions, as well as wet and dry seasons, with some regional exceptions.
- The oceans will continue to warm, with heat extending to the deep ocean, affecting circulation patterns.
- Decreases are very likely in Arctic sea ice cover, Northern Hemisphere spring snow cover, and global glacier volume
- Global mean sea level will continue to rise at a rate very likely to exceed the rate of the past four decades
- Changes in climate will cause an increase in the rate of CO_{2} production. Increased uptake by the oceans will increase the acidification of the oceans.
- Future surface temperatures will be largely determined by cumulative CO_{2}, which means climate change will continue even if CO_{2} emissions are stopped.

The summary also detailed the range of forecasts for warming, and climate impacts with different emission scenarios. Compared to the previous report, the lower bounds for the sensitivity of the climate system to emissions were slightly lowered, though the projections for global mean temperature rise (compared to pre-industrial levels) by 2100 exceeded 1.5 °C in all scenarios.

In August 2020 scientists reported that observed ice-sheet losses in Greenland and Antarctica track worst-case scenarios of the IPCC Fifth Assessment Report's sea-level rise projections.

== Reception ==
On 14 December 2012, drafts of the Working Group 1 (WG1) report were leaked and posted on the Internet. The release of the summary for policymakers occurred on 27 September 2013. Halldór Thorgeirsson, a UN official, warned that, because big companies are known to fund the undermining of climate science, scientists should be prepared for an increase in negative publicity at the time. "Vested interests are paying for the discrediting of scientists all the time. We need to be ready for that," he said.

Marking the finalization of the Physical Science Basis UN Secretary General Ban Ki-moon addressed the IPCC at Stockholm on 27 September 2013. He stated that "the heat is on. We must act". Jennifer Morgan, from the World Resources Institute, said "Hopefully the IPCC will inspire leadership, from the Mom to the business leader, to the mayor to the head of state." US Secretary of State John Kerry responded to the report saying "This is yet another wakeup call: those who deny the science or choose excuses over action are playing with fire."

Reporting on the publication of the report, The Guardian said that:

In the end it all boils down to risk management. The stronger our efforts to reduce greenhouse gas emissions, the lower the risk of extreme climate impacts. The higher our emissions, the larger climate changes we'll face, which also means more expensive adaptation, more species extinctions, more food and water insecurities, more income losses, more conflicts, and so forth.

The New York Times reported that:

In Washington, President Obama's science adviser, John P. Holdren, cited increased scientific confidence "that the kinds of harm already being experienced from climate change will continue to worsen unless and until comprehensive and vigorous action to reduce emissions is undertaken worldwide."

It went on to say that Ban Ki-moon, the United Nations secretary general, had declared his intention to call a meeting of heads of state in 2014 to develop such a treaty. The last such meeting, in Copenhagen in 2009, the NY Times reported, had ended in disarray.

== See also ==
- Renewable Energy Sources and Climate Change Mitigation – IPCC special report, 2011
- IPCC Sixth Assessment Report
