= Intergovernmental Panel on Climate Change =

Scientific intergovernmental body

- Abbreviation: IPCC
- Formation: 1988; 38 years ago
- Type: Panel
- Headquarters: Geneva, Switzerland
- Chair: Jim Skea
- Vice-Chair: Diana Ürge-Vorsatz, Ramón Pichs Madruga, Ladislaus Chang'a
- Parent organization: World Meteorological Organization; United Nations Environment Program
- Website: www.ipcc.ch

The Intergovernmental Panel on Climate Change (IPCC) is an intergovernmental body of the United Nations (UN). Its job is to "provide governments at all levels with scientific information that they can use to develop climate policies". The World Meteorological Organization (WMO) and the United Nations Environment Programme (UNEP) set up the IPCC in 1988. The UN endorsed the creation of the IPCC later that year. It has a secretariat in Geneva, Switzerland, hosted by the WMO. It has 195 member states who govern the IPCC. The member states elect a bureau of scientists to serve through an assessment cycle. A cycle is usually six to seven years. The bureau selects experts in their fields to prepare IPCC reports. There is a formal nomination process by governments and observer organizations to find these experts. The IPCC has three working groups and a task force, which carry out its scientific work.

The IPCC informs governments about the state of knowledge of climate change. It does this by examining all the relevant scientific literature on the subject. This includes the natural, economic and social impacts and risks. It also covers possible response options. The IPCC does not conduct its own original research. It aims to be objective and comprehensive. Thousands of scientists and other experts volunteer to review the publications. They compile key findings into "Assessment Reports" for policymakers and the general public; Experts have described this work as the biggest peer review process in the scientific community. The IPCC was the first of three global science policy panels to be established, followed by and IPBES (Intergovernmental Platform on Biodiversity and Ecosystem Services), established in 2012 and the Intergovernmental Science-Policy Panel on Chemicals, Waste and Pollution (ISPCWP) established in 2025.

Leading climate scientists and all member governments endorse the IPCC's findings. This underscores that the IPCC is a well-respected authority on climate change. Governments, civil society organizations, and the media regularly quote from the panel's reports. IPCC reports play a key role in the annual climate negotiations held by the United Nations Framework Convention on Climate Change (UNFCCC). The IPCC Fifth Assessment Report was an important influence on the landmark Paris Agreement in 2015. The IPCC shared the 2007 Nobel Peace Prize with Al Gore for contributions to the understanding of climate change.

The seventh assessment cycle of the IPCC began in 2023. In August 2021, the IPCC published its Working Group I contribution to the Sixth Assessment Report on the physical science basis of climate change. The Guardian described this report as the "starkest warning yet" of "major inevitable and irreversible climate changes". Many newspapers around the world echoed this theme. In February 2022, the IPCC released its Working Group II report on impacts and adaptation. It published Working Group III's "mitigation of climate change" contribution to the Sixth Assessment in April 2022. The Sixth Assessment Report concluded with a Synthesis Report in March 2023.

During the period of the Sixth Assessment Report, the IPCC released three special reports. The first and most influential was the Special Report on Global Warming of 1.5°C in 2018. In 2019 the Special Report on Climate Change and Land, and the Special Report on the Ocean and Cryosphere in a Changing Climate came out. The IPCC also updated its methodologies in 2019. So the sixth assessment cycle was the most ambitious in the IPCC's history.

In January 2026, United States president Donald Trump announced that the United States would withdraw from the organization.

== Origins ==
The predecessor of the IPCC was the Advisory Group on Greenhouse Gases (AGGG). Three organizations set up the AGGG in 1986. These were the International Council of Scientific Unions, the United Nations Environment Programme (UNEP), and the World Meteorological Organization (WMO). The AGGG reviewed scientific research on greenhouse gases. It also studied increases in greenhouse gases. Climate science was becoming more complicated and covering more disciplines. This small group of scientists lacked the resources to cover climate science.

The United States Environmental Protection Agency sought an international convention to restrict greenhouse gas emissions. The Reagan administration worried that independent scientists would have too much influence. The WMO and UNEP therefore created the IPCC as an intergovernmental body in 1988. Scientists take part in the IPCC as both experts and government representatives. The IPCC produces reports backed by all leading relevant scientists. Member governments must also endorse the reports by consensus agreement. So the IPCC is both a scientific body and an organization of governments. Its job is to tell governments what scientists know about climate change. It also examines the impacts of climate change and options for dealing with it. The IPCC does this by assessing peer-reviewed scientific literature.

The United Nations endorsed the creation of the IPCC in 1988. The General Assembly resolution noted that human activity could change the climate. This could lead to severe economic and social consequences. It said increasing concentrations of greenhouse gases could warm the planet. This would cause the sea level to rise. The effects on humanity would be disastrous if timely steps were not taken.

== Organization ==
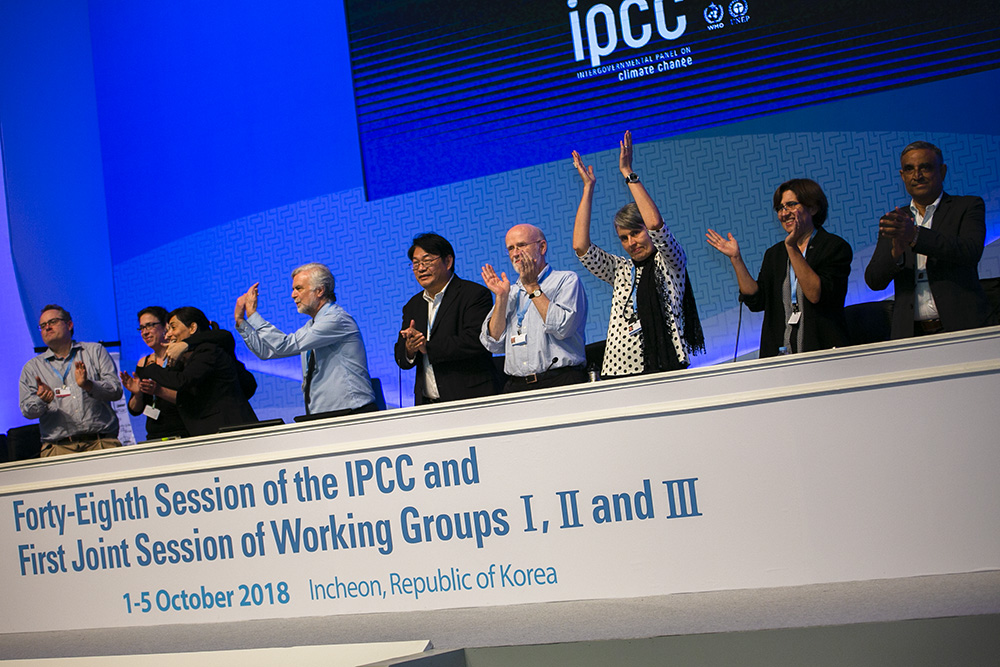
Adoption of the Summary for Policymakers of the IPCC Special Report on Global Warming of 1.5°C in 2018

=== Way of working ===
The IPCC does not conduct original research. It produces comprehensive assessments on the state of knowledge of climate change. It prepares reports on special topics relevant to climate change. It also produces methodologies. These methodologies help countries estimate their greenhouse gas emissions and removals through sinks. Its assessments build on previous reports and scientific publications. Throughout six assessments the reports reflect the growing evidence for a changing climate. And they show how this is due to human activity.

=== Rules and governing principles ===
The IPCC has adopted its rules of procedure in the "Principles Governing IPCC Work". These state that the IPCC will assess:

- the risk of climate change caused by human activities,
- its potential impacts, and
- possible options for prevention.

Under IPCC rules its assessments are comprehensive, objective, open, and transparent. They cover all the information relevant to the scientific understanding of climate change. This draws on scientific, technical, and socioeconomic information. IPCC reports must be neutral regarding policy recommendations. However, they may address the objective factors relevant to enacting policies.

=== Structure ===
The IPCC has the following structure:

- IPCC Panel: Meets in plenary session about twice a year. It may meet more often for the approval of reports. It controls the IPCC's structure, procedures, work programme, and budget. It accepts and approves IPCC reports. The Panel is the IPCC corporate entity.
- Chair: Elected by the Panel. Chairs the Bureau and other bodies. Represents the organization.
- Bureau: Elected by the Panel. It currently has 34 members from different geographic regions. Besides the Chair and three IPCC Vice-Chairs, they provide the leadership for the IPCC's three Working Groups and Task Force. It provides guidance to the Panel on the scientific and technical aspects of its work.
- Working Groups: Each has two Co-Chairs, one from a developed and one from a developing country. A technical support unit supports each Working Group. Working Group sessions approve the Summary for Policymakers of assessment and special reports. Each Working Group has a Bureau. This consists of its Co-Chairs and Vice-Chairs, who are also members of the IPCC Bureau.
  - Working Group I: Assesses scientific aspects of the climate system and climate change. Co-Chairs: Robert Vautard (France) and Xiaoye Zhang (China)
  - Working Group II: Assesses the impacts of climate change on human and natural systems. Assesses adaptation options. Co-Chairs: Bart van den Hurk (Netherlands) and Winston Chow (Singapore)
  - Working Group III: Assesses how to stop climate change by limiting greenhouse gas emissions. (Known as "mitigation".) Co-Chairs: Katherine Calvin (United States) and Joy Jacqueline Pereira (Malaysia)
- Task Force on National Greenhouse Gas Inventories. Develops methodologies for estimating greenhouse gas emissions. Co-Chairs: Takeshi Enoki (Japan) and Mazhar Hayat (Pakistan)
  - Task Force Bureau: Consists of two Co-Chairs, who are also members of the IPCC Bureau, and 12 members.
- Executive Committee: Consists of the Chair, IPCC Vice-Chairs and the Co-Chairs of the Working Groups and Task Force. It addresses urgent issues that arise between sessions of the Panel.
- Secretariat: Administers activities, supports the Chair and Bureau, point of contact for governments. Supported by UNEP and the WMO.

==== Chair ====
The chair of the IPCC is British energy scientist Jim Skea, who is hosted by the International Institute for Environment and Development. Skea has served since 28 July 2023 with the election of the new IPCC Bureau. His predecessor was Korean economist Hoesung Lee, elected in 2015. The previous chairs were Rajendra K. Pachauri, elected in 2002, Robert Watson, elected in 1997, and Bert Bolin, elected in 1988.

==== Panel ====
The Panel consists of representatives appointed by governments. They take part in plenary sessions of the IPCC and its Working Groups. Non-governmental and intergovernmental organizations may attend as observers. Meetings of IPCC bodies are by invitation only. About 500 people from 130 countries attended the 48th Session of the Panel in Incheon, Republic of Korea. This took place in October 2018. They included 290 government officials and 60 representatives of observer organizations. The opening ceremonies of sessions of the Panel and of Lead Author Meetings are open to media. Otherwise, IPCC meetings are closed.

=== Funding ===
The IPCC receives funding through a dedicated trust fund. UNEP and the WMO established the fund in 1989. The trust fund receives annual financial contributions from member governments. The WMO, UNEP, and other organizations also contribute. Payments are voluntary and there is no set amount required. The WMO covers the operating costs of the secretariat. It also sets the IPCC's financial regulations and rules. The Panel sets the annual budget.

In 2021, the IPCC's annual budget amounts to approximately six million euros, financed by the 195 UN Member states, who contribute "independently and voluntarily". In 2021, the countries giving the most money include the United States, Japan, France, Germany and Norway. Other countries, often developing ones, give an "in-kind contribution, by hosting IPCC meetings". In 2022, this budget was a little less than eight million euros.

=== List of all reports ===
Year	Name of report	Type of report
2023	AR6 Synthesis Report: Climate Change 2023 (March 2023)	Synthesis Report
2021 and 2022	Sixth Assessment Report (AR6): Climate Change 2021: The Physical Science Basis (Working Group I, August 2021), Climate Change 2022: Impacts, Adaptation and Vulnerability (Working Group II, February 2022), Mitigation of Climate Change (Working Group III, April 2022)	Assessment Report (Working Group contributions)
2019	Special Report on the Ocean and Cryosphere in a Changing Climate	Special Report
2019	Special Report on Climate Change and Land	Special Report
2019	2019 Refinement to the 2006 IPCC Guidelines for National Greenhouse Gas Inventories	Methodology Report
2018	Special Report on Global Warming of 1.5 °C (SR15)	Special Report
2014	AR5 Synthesis Report: Climate Change 2014	Synthesis Report
2013 and 2014	Fifth Assessment Report (AR5) Climate Change 2013: The Physical Science Basis (Working Group I, September 2013), Climate Change 2014: Impacts, Adaptation and Vulnerability (Working Group II, March 2014), Climate Change 2014: Mitigation of Climate Change (Working Group III, April 2014)	Assessment (Working Group contributions)
2013	2013 Supplement to the 2006 IPCC Guidelines for National Greenhouse Gas Inventories: Wetlands	Methodology Report
2013	2013 Revised Supplementary Methods and Good Practice Guidance Arising from the Kyoto Protocol	Methodology Report
2011	Managing the Risks of Extreme Events and Disasters to Advance Climate Change Adaptation	Special Report
2011	Renewable Energy Sources and Climate Change Mitigation	Special Report
2007	AR4 Synthesis Report: Climate Change 2007	Synthesis Report
2007	Fourth Assessment Report (AR4) Climate Change 2007: The Physical Science Basis (Working Group I, February 2007), Climate Change 2007: Impacts, Adaptation, and Vulnerability (Working Group II, April 2007), Climate Change 2007: Mitigation of Climate Change (Working Group III, May 2007)	Assessment Report (Working Group contributions)
2006	2006 IPCC Guidelines for National Greenhouse Gas Inventories	Methodology Report
2005	Safeguarding the Ozone Layer and the Global Climate System	Special Report
2005	Carbon Dioxide Capture and Storage	Special Report
2003	Good Practice Guidance for Land Use, Land-Use Change and Forestry	Methodology Report
2003	Definitions and Methodological Options to Inventory Emissions from Direct Human-induced Degradation of Forests and Devegatation of Other Vegetation Types	Methodology Report
2001	TAR Synthesis Report: Climate Change 2001	Synthesis Report
2001	Third Assessment Report (TAR) Climate Change 2001: The Scientific Basis (Working Group I), Climate Change 2001: Impacts, Adaptation, and Vulnerability (Working Group II), Climate Change 2001: Mitigation (Working Group III)	Assessment Report (Working Group contributions)
2000	Good Practice Guidance and Uncertainty Management in National Greenhouse Gas Inventories	Methodology Report
2000	Methodological and Technological Issues in Technology Transfer	Special Report
2000	Land Use, Land-Use Change, and Forestry	Special Report
2000	Special Report on Emissions Scenarios	Special Report
1999	Aviation and the Global Atmosphere	Special Report
1997	The Regional Impacts of Climate Change: An Assessment of Vulnerability	Special Report
1996	Revised 1996 IPCC Guidelines for National Greenhouse Gas Inventories	Methodology Report
1996	SAR Synthesis Report: Climate Change 1995	Synthesis Report
1995	Second Assessment Report (SAR) Climate Change 1995: The Science of Climate Change (Working Group I), Climate Change 1995: Impacts, Adaptations and Mitigation of Climate Change: Scientific-Technical Analyses (Working Group II), Climate Change 1995: Economic and Social Dimensions of Climate Change (Working Group III)	Assessment Report (Working Group contributions)
1994	IPCC Guidelines for National Greenhouse Gas Inventories	Methodology Report
1994	Climate Change 1994: Radiative Forcing of Climate Change and An Evaluation of the IPCC IS92 Emission Scenarios	Special Report
1994	IPCC Technical Guidelines for Assessing Climate Change Impacts and Adaptations	Special Report
1992	FAR Climate Change: The IPCC 1990 and 1992 Assessments (June 1992) (includes an Overview of the whole report)	Assessment Report (Working Group contributions)/Synthesis Report
1992	FAR Climate Change 1992: The Supplementary Report to the IPCC Scientific Assessment (Working Group I, February 2022), Climate Change 1992: The Supplementary Report to the IPCC Impacts Assessment (Working Group II, February 2022)	Assessment Report (Working Group contributions)
1990	First Assessment Report (FAR) Climate Change: The IPCC Scientific Assessment (Working Group I), Climate Change: The IPCC Impacts Assessment (Working Group II), Climate Change: The IPCC Response Strategies (Working Group III)	Assessment Report (Working Group contributions)

=== Activities other than report preparation ===
The IPCC bases its work on the decisions of the WMO and UNEP, which established the IPCC. It also supports the work of the UNFCCC. The main work of the IPCC is to prepare assessments and other reports. It also supports other activities such as the Data Distribution Centre. This helps manage data related to IPCC reports.

The IPCC has a "Gender Policy and Implementation Plan" to pay attention to gender in its work. It aims to carry out its work inclusively and respectfully. The IPCC aims for balance in participation in IPCC work. This should offer all participants equal opportunity.

==== Communications and dissemination activities ====
The IPCC enhanced its communications activities for the Fifth Assessment Report. For instance, it made the approved report and press release available to registered media under embargo before the release. And it expanded its outreach activities with an outreach calendar. The IPCC held an Expert Meeting on Communication in February 2016, at the start of the Sixth Assessment Report cycle. Members of the old and new Bureaus worked with communications experts and practitioners at this meeting. This meeting produced a series of recommendations. The IPCC adopted many of them. One was to bring people with communications expertise into the Working Group Technical Support Units. Another was to consider communication questions early on in the preparation of reports.

Following these steps in communications, the IPCC saw a significant increase in media coverage of its reports. This was particularly the case with the Special Report on Global Warming of 1.5 °C in 2018 and Climate Change 2021: The Physical Science Basis, the Working Group I contribution to the Sixth Assessment Report, in 2021. There was also much greater public interest, reflected in the youth and other movements that emerged in 2018.

IPCC reports are important for public awareness of climate change and related policymaking. This has led to several academic studies of IPCC communications, for example in 2021.

==== Archiving ====
The IPCC archives its reports and electronic files on its website. They include the review comments on drafts of reports. The Environmental Science and Public Policy Archives in the Harvard Library also archives them.

== Assessment reports ==
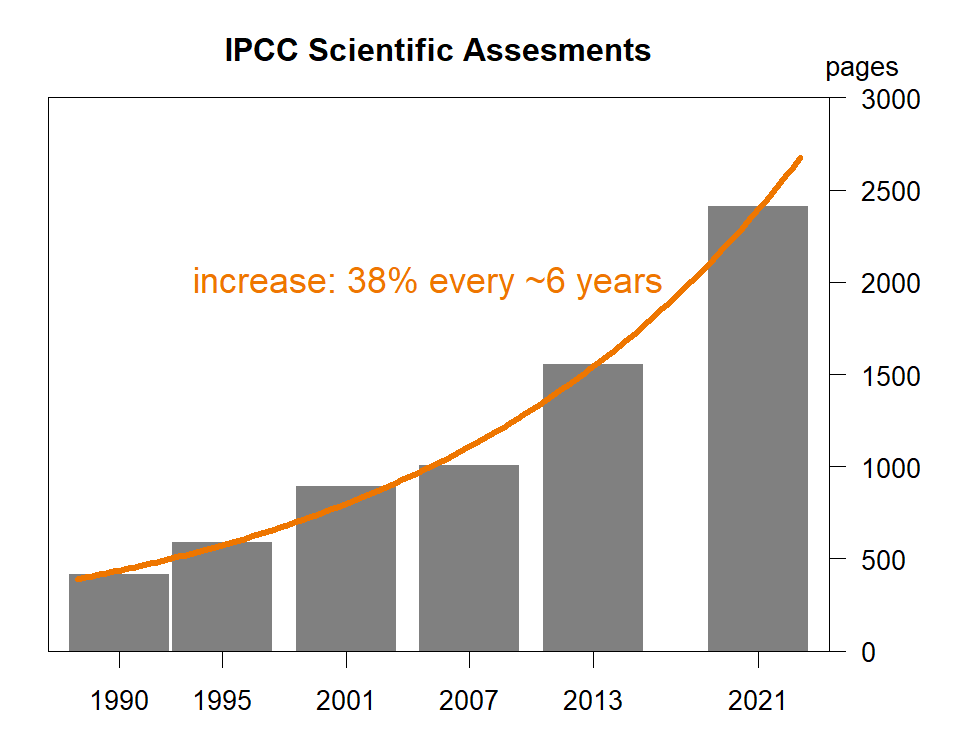
Page counts of the six IPCC Assessment Reports (1990 to 2021)

Between 1990 and 2023, the IPCC published six comprehensive assessment reports reviewing the latest climate science. The IPCC has also produced 14 special reports on particular topics. Each assessment report has four parts. These are a contribution from each of the three working groups, plus a synthesis report. The synthesis report integrates the working group contributions. It also integrates any special reports produced in that assessment cycle.

=== Review process of scientific literature ===
The IPCC does not carry out research. It does not monitor climate-related data. The reports by IPCC assess scientific papers and independent results from other scientific bodies. The IPCC sets a deadline for publication of scientific papers that a report will cover. That report will not include new information that emerges after this deadline. However, there is a steady evolution of key findings and levels of scientific confidence from one assessment report to the next. Each IPCC report notes areas where the science has improved since the previous report. It also notes areas that would benefit from further research.

The First Assessment Report was published in 1990 and received an update in 1992. In intervals of about six years, new editions of IPCC Assessment Report followed.

=== Selection and role of authors ===
The focal points of the Member states — the individual appointed by each state to liaise with the IPCC — and the observer organizations submit to the IPCC Bureau a list of personalities, which they have freely constituted. The Bureau (more precisely, the co-chairs of the relevant working group, with the help of its technical support unit) uses these lists as a basis for appointing authors while retaining the possibility of appointing people who are not on the list, primarily based on scientific excellence and diversity of viewpoints, and to a lesser extent by ensuring geographical diversity, experience within the IPCC and gender. Authors may include, in addition to researchers, personalities from the private sector and experts from NGOs.

The IPCC Bureau or Working Group Bureau selects the authors of the reports from government nominations. Lead authors of IPCC reports assess the available information about climate change based on published sources. According to IPCC guidelines, authors should give priority to peer-reviewed sources. Authors may refer to non-peer-reviewed sources ("grey literature"), if they are of sufficient quality. These could include reports from government agencies and non-governmental organizations. Industry journals and model results are other examples of non-peer-reviewed sources.

Authors prepare drafts of a full report divided into chapters. They also prepare a technical summary of the report, and a summary for policymakers.

Each chapter has many authors to write and edit the material. A typical chapter has two coordinating lead authors, ten to fifteen lead authors, and a larger number of contributing authors. The coordinating lead authors assemble the contributions of the other authors. They ensure that contributions meet stylistic and formatting requirements. They report to the Working Group co-chairs. Lead authors write sections of chapters. They invite contributing authors to prepare text, graphs, or data for inclusion. Review editors must ensure that authors respond to comments received during the two stages of drafts review: the first is only open to external experts and researchers, while the second is also open to government representatives.

The Bureau aims for a range of views, expertise, and geographical representation in its choice of authors. This ensures the author team includes experts from both developing and developed countries. The Bureau also seeks a balance between male and female authors. It aims for a balance between those who have worked previously on IPCC reports and those new to the process.

Scientists who work as authors on IPCC reports do not receive any compensation for this work, and all work voluntarily. They depend on the salaries they receive from their home institutions or other work. The work is labour-intensive with a big time commitment. It can disrupt participating scientists' research. This has led to concern that the IPCC process may discourage qualified scientists from participating. More than 3,000 authors (coordinating lead authors, lead authors, review editors) have participated in the drafting of IPCC reports since its creation.

=== Review process for assessment reports ===
Expert reviewers comment at different stages on the drafts. Reviewers come from member governments and IPCC observers. Also, anyone may become an IPCC reviewer by stating they have the relevant expertise.

There are generally three stages in the review process. First comes an expert review of the first draft of the chapters. The next stage is a review by governments and experts of the revised draft of the chapters and the first draft of the Summary for Policymakers. The third stage is a government review of the revised Summary for Policymakers. Review comments and author responses remain in an open archive for at least five years. Finally, government representatives together with the authors review the Summary for Policymakers. They go through the Summary for Policymakers line by line to ensure it is a good summary of the underlying report. This final review of the Summary of Policymakers takes place at sessions of the responsible working group or of the Panel.

There are several types of endorsement that documents receive:

- Approval - Material has been subject to detailed, line-by-line discussion and agreement. (The relevant Working Groups approve Working Group Summaries for Policymakers. The Panel approves the Synthesis Report Summary for Policymakers.)
- Adoption - Endorsed section by section (not line by line). (The Panel adopts the full IPCC Synthesis Report. It also adopts Overview Chapters of Methodology Reports.)
- Acceptance - Not been subject to line-by-line discussion and agreement. But it presents a comprehensive, objective, and balanced view of the subject matter. (Working Groups accept their reports. The Panel accepts Working Group Summaries for Policymakers after working group approval. The Panel accepts Methodology Reports.)

=== Key findings and impacts ===
==== Assessment reports one to five (1990 to 2014) ====
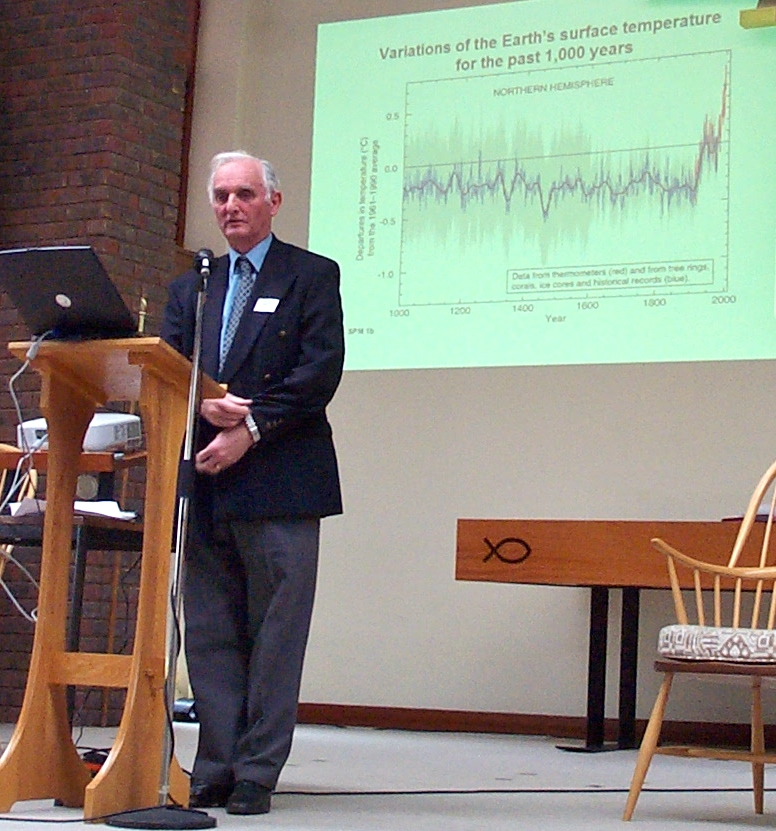
IPCC Third Assessment Report Working Group I Co-chair Sir John T. Houghton showing a figure that was included in the "Summary for Policymakers" of that report ("hockey stick graph") at a climate conference in 2005

- The IPCC's First Assessment Report (FAR) appeared in 1990. The report gave a broad overview of climate change science. It discussed uncertainties and provided evidence of warming. The authors said they are certain that greenhouse gases are increasing in the atmosphere because of human activity. This is resulting in more warming of the Earth's surface. The report led to the establishment of the United Nations Framework Convention on Climate Change (UNFCCC).
- The Second Assessment Report (SAR), was published in 1995. It strengthened the findings of the First Assessment Report. The evidence suggests that there is a discernible human influence on the global climate, it said. The Second Assessment Report provided important material for the negotiations leading to the UNFCCC's Kyoto Protocol.
- The Third Assessment Report (TAR) was completed in 2001. It found more evidence that most of the global warming seen over the previous 50 years was due to human activity. The report includes a graph reconstructing global temperature since the year 1000. The sharp rise in temperature in recent years gave it the name "hockey stick". This became a powerful image of how temperature is soaring with climate change. The report also shows how adaptation to the effects of climate change can reduce some of its ill effects.
- The IPCC's Fourth Assessment Report (AR4) was published in 2007. It gives much greater certainty about climate change. It states: "Warming of the climate system is unequivocal..." The report helped make people around the world aware of climate change. The IPCC shared the Nobel Peace Prize in the year of the report's publication for this work (see below).
- The Fifth Assessment Report (AR5) was published in 2013 and 2014. This report again stated the fact of climate change. It warned of the dangerous risks. And it emphasizes how the world can counter climate change. Three key findings were for example: Firstly, human influence on the climate system is clear. Secondly, the more we disrupt our climate, the more we risk severe, pervasive, and irreversible impacts. And thirdly, we have the means to limit climate change and build a more prosperous, sustainable future. The report's findings were the scientific foundation of the UNFCCC's 2015 Paris Agreement.

==== Sixth assessment report (2021/2022) ====
The IPCC's most recent report is the Sixth Assessment Report (AR6). The first three installments of AR6 appeared in 2021 and 2022. The final synthesis report was completed in March 2023.

The IPCC published the Working Group I report, Climate Change 2021: The Physical Science Basis, in August 2021. It confirms that the climate is already changing in every region. Many of these changes have not been seen in thousands of years. Many of them such as sea-level rise are irreversible over hundreds of thousands of years. Strong reductions in greenhouse gas emissions would limit climate change. But it could take 20–30 years for the climate to stabilize. This report attracted enormous media and public attention. U.N. Secretary-General António Guterres described it as "code red for humanity".

The IPCC published the Working Group II report, Climate Change 2022: Impacts, Adaptation and Vulnerability, in February 2022. Climate change due to human activities is already affecting the lives of billions of people, it said. It is disrupting nature. The world faces unavoidable hazards over the next two decades even with global warming of 1.5 °C, it said.

The IPCC published the Working Group III report, Climate Change 2022: Mitigation of Climate Change, in April 2022. It will be impossible to limit warming to 1.5 °C without immediate and deep cuts in greenhouse gas emissions. It is still possible to halve emissions by 2050, it said.

== Other reports ==
=== Special reports ===
The IPCC also publishes other types of reports. It produces Special Reports on topics proposed by governments or observer organizations. Between 1994 and 2019 the IPCC published 14 special reports. Now usually more than one working group cooperates to produce a special report. The preparation and approval process is the same as for assessment reports.

==== Special reports in 2011 ====
During the fifth assessment cycle, the IPCC produced two special reports. It completed the Special Report on Renewable Energy Sources and Climate Change Mitigation in 2011. Working Group III prepared this report. The report examined options to use different types of renewable energy to replace fossil fuels. The report noted that the cost of most renewable technologies had fallen. It was likely to fall even more with further advances in technology. It said renewables could increase access to energy. The report reviewed 164 scenarios that examine how renewables could help stop climate change. In more than half of these scenarios, renewables would contribute more than 27% of the primary energy supply in the mid-century. This would be more than double the 13% share in 2008. In the scenarios with the highest shares for renewable energy, it will contribute 77% by 2050.

Later in 2011, the IPCC released the Special Report on Managing the Risks of Extreme Events and Disasters to Advance Climate Change Adaptation. This was a collaboration between Working Groups I and II. It was the first time two IPCC working groups worked together on a special report. The report shows how climate change has contributed to changes in extreme weather. And it shows how policies to avoid and prepare for extreme weather events can reduce their impact. In the same way, policies to respond to events and recover from them can make societies more resilient.

==== Special reports 2018–2019 ====
During the sixth assessment cycle, the IPCC produced three special reports. This made it the most ambitious cycle in IPCC history. The UNFCCC set a goal of keeping global warming well below 2 °C (36 °F) while trying to hold it at 1.5 °C (34.7 °F), when it reached the Paris Agreement at COP21 in 2015. But at the time there was little understanding of what warming of 1.5 °C meant. There was little scientific research explaining how the impacts of 1.5 °C would differ from 2 °C. And there was little understanding about how to keep warming to 1.5 °C. So the UNFCCC invited the IPCC to prepare a report on global warming of 1.5 °C. The IPCC subsequently released the Special Report on Global Warming of 1.5 °C (SR15) in 2018. The report showed that it was possible to keep warming below 1.5 °C during the 21st century. But this would mean deep cuts in emissions. It would also mean rapid, far-reaching changes in all aspects of society. The report showed warming of 2 °C would have much more severe impacts than 1.5 °C. In other words: every bit of warming matters. SR15 had an unprecedented impact on an IPCC report in the media and with the public. It put the 1.5 °C target at the centre of climate activism.

In 2019 the IPCC released two more special reports that examine different parts of the climate system. The Special Report on Climate Change and Land examined how the way we use land affects the climate. It looked at emissions from activities such as farming and forestry rather than from energy and transport. It also looked at how climate change is affecting land. All three IPCC working groups and its Task Force on National Greenhouse Gas Inventories collaborated on the report. The report found that climate change is adding to the pressures we are putting on the land we use to live on and grow our food. It will only be possible to keep warming well below 2 °C if we reduce emissions from all sectors including land and food, it said.

The Special Report on the Ocean and Cryosphere in a Changing Climate examined how the ocean and frozen parts of the planet interact with climate change. (The cryosphere includes frozen systems such as ice sheets, glaciers, and permafrost.) IPCC Working Groups I and II prepared the report. The report highlighted the need to tackle unprecedented changes in the ocean and cryosphere. It also showed how adaptation could help sustainable development.

=== Methodology Reports ===
The IPCC has a National Greenhouse Gas Inventories Programme. It develops methodologies and software for countries to report their greenhouse gas emissions. The IPCC's Task Force on National Greenhouse Gas Inventories (TFI) has managed the program since 1998. Japan's Institute for Global Environmental Strategies hosts the TFI's Technical Support Unit.

==== Revised 1996 IPCC Guidelines ====
The IPCC released its first Methodology Report, the IPCC Guidelines for National Greenhouse Gas Inventories, in 1994. The Revised 1996 IPCC Guidelines for National Greenhouse Gas Inventories updated this report. Two "good practice reports" complete these guidelines. These are the Good Practice Guidance and Uncertainty Management in National Greenhouse Gas Inventories and Good Practice Guidance for Land Use, Land-Use Change and Forestry. Parties to the UNFCCC and its Kyoto Protocol use the 1996 guidelines and two good practice reports for their annual submissions of inventories.

==== 2006 IPCC Guidelines ====
The 2006 IPCC Guidelines for National Greenhouse Gas Inventories further update these methodologies. They include a large number of "default emission factors". These are factors to estimate the amount of emissions for an activity. The IPCC prepared this new version of the guidelines at the request of the UNFCCC. The UNFCCC accepted them for use at its 2013 Climate Change Conference, COP19, in Warsaw. The IPCC added further material in its 2019 Refinement to the 2006 IPCC Guidelines for National Greenhouse Gas Inventories.

The TFI has started preparations for a methodology report on short-lived climate forcers (SLCFs). It will complete this report in the next assessment cycle, the seventh.

== Challenges and controversies ==
IPCC reports also attract criticism. Criticisms come from both people who say the reports exaggerate the risks and people who say they understate them. The IPCC consensus approach has faced internal and external challenges.

=== Conservative nature of IPCC reports ===
Some critics have argued that IPCC reports tend to be too conservative in their assessments of climate risk. In 2012, it was reported that the IPCC has been criticized by some scientists, who argue that the reports consistently underestimate the pace and impacts of global warming. As a result, they believe this leads to findings that are the "lowest common denominator". Similar claims have also been made by scientists who found that for the last several assessment reports, the focus of the IPCC reports skewed more and more towards lower temperatures, especially 1.5 °C. Temperatures above 2 °C however, have seen much less attention, even though they seem more likely given current emission trajectories.

David Biello, writing in the Scientific American, argues that, because of the need to secure consensus among governmental representatives, the IPCC reports give conservative estimates of the likely extent and effects of global warming. Science editor Brooks Hanson states in a 2010 editorial: "The IPCC reports have underestimated the pace of climate change while overestimating societies' abilities to curb greenhouse gas emissions."

Climate scientist James E. Hansen argues that the IPCC's conservativeness seriously underestimates the risk of sea-level rise on the order of meters—enough to inundate many low-lying areas, such as the southern third of Florida. In January 2024, he told the Guardian, "We are now in the process of moving into the 1.5C world." He added that "passing through the 1.5C world is a significant milestone because it shows that the story being told by the United Nations, with the acquiescence of its scientific advisory body, the IPCC, is a load of bullshit."

Roger A. Pielke Sr. has also stated "Humans are significantly altering the global climate, but in a variety of diverse ways beyond the radiative effect of carbon dioxide. The IPCC assessments have been too conservative in recognizing the importance of these human climate forcings as they alter regional and global climate."

Stefan Rahmstorf, a professor of physics and oceanography at University of Potsdam, argued in 2007 that the IPCC's tendency to make conservative risk assessments had benefits. Rahmstorf argued that "In a way, it is one of the strengths of the IPCC to be very conservative and cautious and not overstate any climate change risk". IPCC reports aim to inform policymakers about the state of knowledge on climate change. They do this by assessing the findings of the thousands of scientific papers available on the subject at a given time. Individual publications may have different conclusions from IPCC reports. This includes those appearing just after the release of an IPCC report. This can lead to criticism that the IPCC is either alarmist or conservative. New findings must wait for the next assessment for consideration.

=== Potential industry and political influence ===
A memo by ExxonMobil to the Bush administration in the United States in 2002 was an example of possible political influence on the IPCC. The memo led to strong Bush administration lobbying to oust Robert Watson, a climate scientist, as IPCC chair. They sought to replace him with Rajendra Pachauri. Many considered Pachauri at the time as more mild-mannered and industry-friendly.

Governments form the membership of the IPCC. They are the prime audience for IPCC reports. IPCC rules give them a formal role in the scoping, preparation, and approval of reports. For instance governments take part in the review process and work with authors to approve the Summary for Policymakers of reports. But some activists have argued that governments abuse this role to influence the outcome of reports.

In 2023, it was reported that pressure from Brazil and Argentina, two countries with large beef industries, caused the IPCC to abandon text recommending the adoption of plant-based diets. An earlier draft of the report, which noted "plant-based diets can reduce GHG emissions by up to 50% compared to the average emission-intensive Western diet", was leaked online in March 2023.

=== Controversy and review after Fourth Assessment Report in 2007 ===
The IPCC came under unprecedented media scrutiny in 2009 in the run-up to the Copenhagen climate conference. This "Climatic Research Unit email controversy" involved the leak of emails from climate scientists. Many of these scientists were authors of the Fourth Assessment Report which came out in 2007. The discovery of an error in this report that the Himalayan glaciers would melt by 2035 put the IPCC under further pressure. Scientific bodies upheld the general findings of the Fourth Assessment Report and the IPCC's approach. But many people thought the IPCC should review the way it works.

==== InterAcademy Council review in 2010 ====
Public debate after the publication of AR4 in 2009 put the IPCC under scrutiny, with controversies over alleged bias and inaccuracy in its reports. In 2010, this prompted U.N. Secretary-General Ban Ki-moon and IPCC chair Rajendra K. Pachauri to request that the InterAcademy Council (IAC) review the IPCC and recommend ways to strengthen its processes and procedures for the preparation of AR5. The IAC report made recommendations to fortify IPCC's management structure, to further develop its conflict-of-interest policy, to strengthen the review process, to clarify the guidelines on the use of so-called gray literature, to ensure consistency in the use of probabilities for the likelihood of outcomes, and to improve its communications strategy, especially regarding transparency and rapidity of response.

The United Nations Secretary-General and the Chair of the IPCC asked the InterAcademy Council (IAC) in March 2010 to review the IPCC's processes for preparing its reports. The IAC panel, chaired by Harold Tafler Shapiro, released its report on 1 September 2010. The IAC panel made seven formal recommendations for improving the IPCC's assessment process. The IPCC implemented most of the review's recommendations by 2012. One of these was the introduction of a protocol to handle errors in reports. Other recommendations included strengthening the science-review process and improving communications. However, the IPCC did not adopt the proposal to appoint a full-time executive secretary.

=== Issues with consensual approach ===
Michael Oppenheimer, a long-time participant in the IPCC, has said the IPCC consensus approach has some limitations. Oppenheimer, a coordinating lead author of the Fifth Assessment Report, called for concurring, smaller assessments of special problems instead of the large-scale approach of previous IPCC assessments. Others see "mixed blessings" in the drive for consensus within the IPCC. They suggest including dissenting or minority positions. Others suggest improving statements about uncertainties.

=== Criticism by experts involved with the IPCC process ===
Some of the criticism has originated from experts invited by the IPCC to submit reports or serve on its panels. For example, John Christy, a contributing author who works at the University of Alabama in Huntsville, explained in 2007 the difficulties of establishing scientific consensus on the precise extent of human action on climate change. "Contributing authors essentially are asked to contribute a little text at the beginning and to review the first two drafts. We have no control over editing decisions. Even less influence is granted to the 2,000 or so reviewers. Thus, to say that 800 contributing authors or 2,000 reviewers reached consensus on anything describes a situation that is not reality", he wrote. Christopher Landsea, a hurricane researcher, said of "the part of the IPCC to which my expertise is relevant" that "I personally cannot in good faith continue to contribute to a process that I view as both being motivated by pre-conceived agendas and being scientifically unsound," because of comments made at a press conference by Kevin Trenberth of which Landsea disapproved. Trenberth said "Landsea's comments were not correct"; the IPCC replied "individual scientists can do what they wish in their own rights, as long as they are not saying anything on behalf of the IPCC".

== Endorsements and awards ==
=== Endorsements from scientific bodies ===
IPCC reports are the benchmark for climate science. There is widespread support for the IPCC in the scientific community. Publications by other scientific bodies and experts show this. Many scientific bodies have issued official statements that endorse the findings of the IPCC. For example:

- For the Third Assessment Report in 2001 endorsements came from the Canadian Foundation for Climate and Atmospheric Sciences, United States National Research Council and European Geosciences Union.
- For the Fourth Assessment Report in 2007 endorsements came from the International Council for Science (ICSU), and the Network of African Science Academies.

=== Nobel Peace Prize in 2007 ===
In December 2007, the IPCC received the Nobel Peace Prize "for their efforts to build up and disseminate greater knowledge about man-made climate change, and to lay the foundations for the measures that are needed to counteract such change". It shared the award with former U.S. Vice-president Al Gore for his work on climate change and the documentary An Inconvenient Truth.

=== Gulbenkian Prize for Humanity in 2022 ===
In October 2022, the IPCC and IPBES shared the Gulbenkian Prize for Humanity. The two intergovernmental bodies won the prize because they "produce scientific knowledge, alert society, and inform decision-makers to make better choices for combatting climate change and the loss of biodiversity".

== See also ==
- Intergovernmental Science-Policy Platform on Biodiversity and Ecosystem Services – Intergovernmental science and policy organization
- United Nations Framework Convention on Climate Change – International environmental treaty
- Second Austrian Assessment Report on Climate Change
- Youth Advisory Group on Climate Change, established 2020
