= IPCC Summary for Policymakers =

Climate change summary for policy makers

The Summary for policymakers (SPM) is a summary of the Intergovernmental Panel on Climate Change (IPCC) reports intended to aid policymakers. The form is approved line by line by governments: "Negotiations occur over wording to ensure accuracy, balance, clarity of message, and relevance to understanding and policy."

== Process ==
The IPCC is divided into three "Working Groups" (WG) covering a section of the human-caused climate change topic:

- Working Group I (WGI): The Physical Science Basis.
- Working Group II (WGII): Impacts, Adaptation and Vulnerability
- Working Group III (WGIII): Mitigation of Climate Change

Approximately every five years, each Working Group prepares a full "assessment report" by collating all the available research results.

Before the end of this period, a selection of about 50 scientists within each Working Group produces a first draft "Summary for policymakers" (SPM) summarizing its section of the full assessment report. This first draft SPM is sent for comments to the participating government. Comments are taken into account in a second draft prepared by the scientists. When the full assessment report is finalized, each second draft SPM is then reviewed during a four days plenary session comprising government delegations and observer organizations. Each reviewing session is chaired by the scientists chairing the Working Group, surrounded by a panel of scientists. The government delegations usually consist of one to six delegates, comprising generally a mix of national experts (some of which are part of the IPCC) and a few diplomats or other non-scientist civil servants.

The objective of the review session is to improve the form of the SPM, which must remain faithful to the scientific content of the full assessment report. This process also results in some form of endorsement by the participating governments.

For the Fourth Assessment SPMs, each review lasted three days. The beginning of the first day was open to journalists and started with introductory speeches (from the IPCC President, local politicians, etc.). Then each sentence of the draft SPM, displayed on a giant screen, was discussed at length by the delegates and often ended up completely rewritten. Some paragraphs were removed and others are added, under the full control of the Chair and its panel of scientist who ensured that every sentence strictly conforms to the content of the full assessment. When the discussion on a sentence lasted too long, a subgroup chaired by a scientist was formed to craft aside a revised text for later submission to the plenary. Generally the process was very slow at the beginning: in some cases, as little as a few paragraphs were reviewed at the end of the first day. The review generally ended late in the night of the third day – sometimes even in the next morning. On the fourth day, the reviewed SPM was released during a closing session open to journalists.

== Support for the IPCC process ==
The IPCC process has received widespread support and praise from major scientific bodies. In 2001, a joint statement on climate change was made by sixteen national academies of science. The IPCC process was supported by these academies:

The work of the Intergovernmental Panel on Climate Change (IPCC) represents the consensus of the international scientific community on climate change science. We recognise IPCC as the world's most reliable source of information on climate change and its causes, and we endorse its method of achieving this consensus.

Some IPCC authors have expressed their personal support for the process that produces the Summary for Policymakers document. John Houghton, who was formerly a co-chair of IPCC Working Group I, has stated:

IPCC Policymakers' Summaries are agreed unanimously at intergovernmental meetings involving over 200 government delegates from around 100 countries. This agreement is only achieved after several days of scientific debate (only scientific arguments not political ones are allowed) the main purpose of which is to challenge the scientific chapter authors regarding the accuracy, clarity and relevance of the summary and most especially its consistency with the underlying chapters. Agreement at such a meeting has ensured that the resulting document, so far as is possible, is scientifically accurate, balanced and free from personal or political bias.

Martin Parry, co-chair of the IPCC Working Group II Fourth Assessment Report, has said:

The SPM is chewed over for some days (and sometimes nights) by the panel; and it is this process that has sometimes brought criticism from a few scientists who have questioned how much this government involvement alters the meaning of the scientists' conclusions.

I do not think it does; Plenary might alter some nuances, but the key conclusions of the assessments remain intact.

IPCC author Terry Barker has commented on the IPCC process and Summary for Policymakers document:

My impressions of the IPCC process is that it is an open, highly innovative and progressive means to address the issue, namely the organisation of the scientific policy-relevant advice to governments of an evolving, complex and highly contentious topic. ...

My experience in the 2001 [IPCC] process was that political considerations inevitably play a role in the development of the SPM, since governments will not necessarily agree with the scientific consensus expressed in the initial drafts of the [Summary for Policymakers] SPM. Since there is always some uncertainty in the scientific findings, reasons can always be found to qualify or remove unpalatable conclusions. Whether the political considerations introduce a large gap between what the authors say in the Report and what appears in the SPM is a matter of opinion.

== US National Research Council comments ==
In 2001, the Bush Administration asked the US National Research Council to produce a report on climate change. The committee writing this report was asked, among other things, to comment on the IPCC Working Group I Third Assessment Report and its Summary for Policymakers:

The committee finds that the full IPCC Working Group I (WGI) report is an admirable summary of research activities in climate science, and the full report is adequately summarized in the Technical Summary. The full WGI report and its Technical Summary are not specifically directed at policy. The Summary for Policymakers reflects less emphasis on communicating the basis for uncertainty and a stronger emphasis on areas of major concern associated with human-induced climate change. This change in emphasis appears to be the result of a summary process in which scientists work with policy makers on the document. Written responses from U.S. coordinating and lead scientific authors to the committee indicate, however, that (a) no changes were made without the consent of the convening lead authors (this group represents a fraction of the lead and contributing authors) and (b) most changes that did occur lacked significant impact.

== Debate about Working Group I's 2001 summary ==
IPCC authors Kevin E. Trenberth and Richard Lindzen have criticized past editions of the SPM, alleging that the summary does not completely represent the full report. However, their criticisms were diametrically opposite: Trenberth arguing that the summary diluted the main report, Lindzen arguing that it was too alarmist.

Kevin E. Trenberth, a lead author of the 2001 IPCC Working Group I report, wrote:

The rationale here is that the scientists determine what can be said, but the governments determine how it can best be said.. ... The IPCC process is dependent on the good will of the participants in producing a balanced assessment. However, in Shanghai, it appeared that there were attempts to blunt, and perhaps obfuscate, the messages in the report. ... In spite of these trials and tribulations, the result is a reasonably balanced consensus summary. ...

IPCC author Richard Lindzen has made a number of criticisms of the IPCC. Among his criticisms, Lindzen has stated that the WGI Summary for Policymakers (SPM) does not faithfully summarize the full WGI report.

The report is prefaced by a policymakers' summary written by the editor, Sir John Houghton, director of the United Kingdom Meteorological Office. His summary largely ignores the uncertainty in the report and attempts to present the expectation of substantial warming as firmly based science.

Lindzen has stated that the SPM understates the uncertainty associated with climate models. John Houghton has responded to Lindzen's criticisms of the SPM. Houghton has stressed that the SPM is agreed upon by delegates from many of the world's governments, and that any changes to the SPM must be supported by scientific evidence (see above).

== See also ==
- Renewable Energy Sources and Climate Change Mitigation
- Mitigation of climate change
