= International Academy for Systems and Cybernetic Sciences =

The International Academy for Systems and Cybernetic Sciences (IASCYS) was an honor society initially created by the International Federation for Systems Research (IFSR). It was disbanded in 2026. The academy identified outstanding scientists in systems and cybernetics and elected them as academicians. The IASCYS was dissolved by Secretary General Derek Cabrera, who has attempted to replace it with his own organization, the Academy of Systems Thinking (AST). The creation of AST was never authorized by the IASCYS membership, and AST should not be looked at as a "successor" organization.

== Origin ==
In 2010, the International Federation for Systems Research established an international non-profit association called the International Academy for Systems and Cybernetic Sciences. For six years the IASCYS was governed as an IFSR partner organization, but in 2016 it became an independent organization having its own statutes, rules of procedure, and membership criteria.

== List of Academicians ==
- Mary Catherine Bateson
- Ockert Bosch
- Paul Bourgine
- Pierre Bricage
- Søren Brier
- Pille Bunnell
- Tom R. Burns
- Derek Cabrera
- Xiaoqiang Cai
- Jinde Cao
- Ben Mei Chen
- Guangya Chen
- Hanfu Chen
- Jian Chen
- Mou Chen
- Philip Chen
- T.C. Edwin Cheng
- Gerhard Chroust
- Halder Manuel Ferreira Coelho
- Gerard de Zeeuw
- Zengru Di
- Georgi Dimirovski
- Gérard Donnadieu
- Jean-Pierre Dupuy
- Raúl Espejo
- Charles François
- Ranulph Glanville
- Jifa Gu
- Enrique Herrscher
- Wolfgang Hofkirchner
- Tingwen Huang
- Ali Idri
- Ray Ison
- Michael C. Jackson
- Bin Jiang
- Janusz Kacprzyk
- Louis H. Kauffman
- Kyoichi Jim Kijima
- Helena Knyazeva
- Klaus Krippendorff
- Kin Keung LAI
- James Lam
- Ervin Laszlo
- Vladimir Lefebvre
- Vladmir Lepskiy
- Loet Leydesdorff
- Xuelong Li
- Michael Lissack
- Humberto Maturana
- Gerald R. Midgley
- Antonio Caselles Moncho
- Roberto Moreno-Diaz
- Edgar Morin
- Matjaz Mulej
- Karl H. Muller
- Yoshiteri Nakarnori
- Nebojsa Nakicenovic
- Constantin Virgil Negoita
- Nam Nguyen
- Marcos Papageorgiou
- Francisco Parra-Luna
- José Perez-Rios
- Franz Pichler
- William Reckmeyer
- Laurence D. Richards
- Hiroki Sayama
- Markus Schwaninger
- Bernard C. E. Scott
- Peng Shi
- Martin Smith
- David Snowdon
- George Soros
- Kok Lay Teo
- Robert Trappl
- Murray Turoff
- Stuart Umpleby
- Robert Vallee
- Ernst von Glasersfeld
- Shou Yang Wang
- ZiDong Wang
- Kevin Warwick
- Andrezej P. Wierzbicki
- Jennifer M. Wilby
- Stephen Wolfram
- Jiu Ping Xu
- Zeshui Xu
- Guang-Hong Yang
- Xinmin Yang
- Lean Yu
- Huaguang Zhang
- Ji-Feng Zhang
- Rainer Ernst Zimmermann
