= Reasons for concern =

The Intergovernmental Panel on Climate Change (IPCC) has organized many of the risks of climate change into five "reasons for concern." The reasons for concern show that these risks increase with increases in the Earth's global mean temperature (i.e., global warming). The IPCC's five reasons for concern are: threats to endangered species and unique systems, damages from extreme climate events, effects that fall most heavily on developing countries and the poor within countries, global aggregate impacts (i.e., various measurements of total social, economic and ecological impacts), and large-scale high-impact events. The framework has been updated in subsequent IPCC reports. In the Sixth Assessment Report (AR6), risks associated with all five Reasons for Concern were assessed to increase to high and very high levels at lower global warming levels than in AR5 or the Special Report on Global Warming of 1.5 °C (SR1.5), with greater confidence in the transition ranges (high confidence).

The five reasons for concern are described in more detail below. The following descriptions are based on information from the IPCC's Third (TAR) and Fourth Assessment Reports (AR4), published in 2001 and 2007, respectively.

== Unique and threatened systems ==
Unique systems are restricted to a relatively narrow geographical range but can affect other entities beyond their range (Smith et al., 2001). Unique systems may be physical (e.g., tropical glaciers), biological (e.g., coral reefs), or human (e.g., indigenous communities). IPCC (2007) pointed to evidence of observed impacts on unique and vulnerable systems, with impacts projected to be greater at higher levels of warming. Examples of projected impacts included the risk of species extinctions, coral bleaching and mortality, and increased vulnerability of indigenous communities in the Arctic and on small islands.

== Frequency and severity of extreme climate events ==
With high confidence (see footnote), Smith et al. (2001) concluded that a small increase in global mean temperature (up to 2 °C above the 1990 global mean temperature level) would result in an increase in the frequency and magnitude of many extreme climate events. Higher levels of warming would be associated with further increases in the frequency and magnitude of extreme events. Examples of extreme events include floods, soil moisture deficits, tropical and other storms, anomalous temperatures, and fires. IPCC (2007) pointed to evidence of greater vulnerability to extreme events than had previously been estimated in the TAR.

== Global distribution and balance of impacts ==
The impacts of climate change will not affect everyone equally (Smith et al., 2001). Some individuals, sectors, systems, and regions will be less affected, or may even benefit. In general, developing countries are at a greater risk of adverse impacts from climate change than are developed countries (IPCC, 2001). IPCC (2007) found increased evidence that some groups, such as the poor and elderly, were more vulnerable to climate change than others. This conclusion applied to those living in both developed and developing countries.

== Total economic and ecological impact ==
This reason for concern attempts to reflect the overall (or aggregate) economic and ecological effect of climate change (Smith et al., 2001). Aggregating impacts requires value judgements made by the author of the study regarding the importance of different climate change impacts occurring in different regions and at different times. Depending on these choices, aggregation may be viewed as controversial (Banuri et al., 1996:98-99). Another example of possible controversy is the aggregation of beneficial climate impacts in one region offsetting adverse climate impacts in another region (Smith et al., 2001).

The most common aggregate measure of impacts is money. Monetizing impacts is well-suited to climate change impacts that have an effect on economic markets, e.g., impacts on agriculture, but is less well-suited to impacts that do not clearly have a market value, i.e., "non-market" impacts (Smith et al., 2001). Examples of non-market impacts include the effects of climate change on ecosystems and human health. Alternative measures of aggregate impacts include the number of people affected, change in net primary productivity, and the number of systems undergoing change.

With medium confidence, Smith et al. (2001) concluded that world gross domestic product (GDP) would change by plus or minus a few percent for a small increase in global mean temperature (up to around 2 °C above the 1990 temperature level). With low confidence, aggregate non-market impacts were estimated to be negative for a small temperature increase. In the view of Smith et al. (2001), most people in the world would be negatively affected by a small to medium increase in temperature (up to around 2-3 °C above the 1990 temperature level). Most studies assessed by Smith et al. (2001) projected increasing net losses in world GDP for higher temperatures. More recent studies assessed by Schneider et al. (2007) were consistent with these findings.

== Risk of irreversible large-scale and abrupt transitions ==
Systems may respond in an irregular, discontinuous, abrupt, and unpredictable way to climate change (Smith et al., 2001). This may apply to physical, biological and human systems. Available records of climate variability, for example, reveal sudden fluctuations of key variables at all time scales. Some changes in systems may be "irreversible." Some irreversible changes may be reversible over long time periods, for example, the partial melting of the Greenland ice sheet (IPCC, 2001d:93). Other changes may be intrinsically irreversible, for example, the extinction of species.

Sometimes the word "singularity" is used to describe a system that behaves in an irregular and unpredictable way. Singularities could lead to rapid, large, and unexpected climate change impacts on local, regional, and global scales (Smith et al., 2001). Anticipating and adapting to such events and their impacts would be much more difficult than responding to "smooth" climate change. Examples of large-scale singularities include:

- the possible abrupt shutdown of the Atlantic Meridional Overturning Circulation,
- a large, rapid release of methane into the atmosphere
- the melting of the Greenland and West Antarctic Ice Sheets.

Based on the "vague" evidence they had assessed, Smith et al. (2001) concluded that large-scale, discontinuous climate change impacts were unlikely below 2 °C warming (above 1990 levels). It was judged that large-scale discontinuities might be "relatively plausible" for a sustained warming of 8-10 °C (above 1990 levels). Based on the relatively small set of investigations they had assessed, warming of 4-5 °C was judged to be temperature range where large-scale discontinuities might start to emerge. The rate of warming was also viewed as being important in determining such a temperature range. IPCC (2001) noted that the risk of these events was largely unquantified. Risk was defined as the product of the probabilities of these events and the magnitude of their consequences.

== "Burning embers" diagram ==
The diagram opposite, sometimes called the "burning embers" diagram, is adapted from the Third Assessment Report. The burning embers diagram is based on the five reasons for concern. AR4 provided a written update for each of the reasons for concern, but did not update the burning embers diagram. An update of the burning embers diagram was later provided by a group of IPCC authors (Smith et al., 2009). These authors were responsible for writing the chapter in AR4 which contains the written update of the reasons for concern. Their revision of the burning embers diagram was published independently of the IPCC process, and appeared in the Proceedings of the National Academy of Sciences of the United States of America scientific journal. The revision shows increased risks in all five reasons for concern.

== Footnotes ==
Confidence levels are given for some of the conclusions of the TAR. These confidence levels represented the degree of belief among the authors of the TAR in the validity of a particular conclusion. Confidence levels were assigned based on the authors' collective expert judgment of observational evidence, modeling results, and theory that they had examined. Five confidence levels are used in the TAR (White et al., 2001):

- Very High = 95% or greater
- High = 67-95%
- Medium = 33-67%
- Low = 5-33%
- Very Low = 5% or less
