= IPCC Fourth Assessment Report =

2007 IPCC report

The four SRES scenario families of the Fourth Assessment Report vs. projected global average surface warming until 2100
AR4 (Summary; PDF)	More economic focus	More environmental focus
Globalisation (homogeneous world)	A1 rapid economic growth (groups: A1T; A1B; A1Fl); 1.4–6.4 °C	B1 global environmental sustainability 1.1–2.9 °C
Regionalisation (heterogeneous world)	A2 regionally oriented economic development 2.0–5.4 °C	B2 local environmental sustainability 1.4–3.8 °C

Climate Change 2007, the Fourth Assessment Report (AR4) of the United Nations Intergovernmental Panel on Climate Change (IPCC), was published in 2007 and is the fourth in a series of reports intended to assess scientific, technical and socio-economic information concerning climate change, its potential effects, and options for adaptation and mitigation. The report is the largest and most detailed summary of the climate change situation ever undertaken, produced by thousands of authors, editors, and reviewers from dozens of countries, citing over 6,000 peer-reviewed scientific studies. People from over 130 countries contributed to the IPCC Fourth Assessment Report, which took six years to produce. Contributors to AR4 included more than 2,500 scientific expert reviewers, more than 800 contributing authors, and more than 450 lead authors.

"Robust findings" of the Synthesis report include:

- "Warming of the climate system is unequivocal, as is now evident from observations of increases in global average air and ocean temperatures, widespread melting of snow and ice and rising global average sea level".
- Most of the global average warming over the past 50 years is "very likely" (greater than 90% probability, based on expert judgement) due to human activities.
- "Impacts [of climate change] will very likely increase due to increased frequencies and intensities of some extreme weather events".
- "Anthropogenic warming and sea level rise would continue for centuries even if GHG emissions were to be reduced sufficiently for GHG concentrations to stabilise, due to the time scales associated with climate processes and feedbacks". Stabilization of atmospheric greenhouse gas concentrations is discussed in climate change mitigation.
- "Some planned adaptation (of human activities) is occurring now; more extensive adaptation is required to reduce vulnerability to climate change".
- "Unmitigated climate change would, in the long term, be likely to exceed the capacity of natural, managed and human systems to adapt".
- "Many impacts [of climate change] can be reduced, delayed or avoided by mitigation".

== Overview ==
Like previous assessment reports, it consists of four reports:

- Working Group I: The Physical Science Basis
- Working Group II: Impacts, Adaptation and Vulnerability
- Working Group III: Mitigation
- Synthesis Report

Global warming projections from AR4 are shown below. The projections apply to the end of the 21st century (2090–2099), relative to temperatures at the end of the 20th century (1980–1999). Add 0.7 °C to projections to make them relative to pre-industrial levels instead of 1980–1999. (UK Royal Society, 2010, p=10). Descriptions of the greenhouse gas emissions scenarios can be found in Special Report on Emissions Scenarios.

AR4 global warming projections
Emissions scenario	Best estimate (°C)	"Likely" range (°C)
B1	1.8	1.1 – 2.9
A1T	2.4	1.4 – 3.8
B2	2.4	1.4 – 3.8
A1B	2.8	1.7 – 4.4
A2	3.4	2.0 – 5.4
A1FI	4.0	2.4 – 6.4

"Likely" means greater than 66% probability of being correct, based on expert judgement.

== Sections ==
The report was released in four principal sections:

- Contribution of Working Group I (WGI): Climate Change 2007: The Physical Science Basis.
- Contribution of Working Group II (WGII): Climate Change 2007: Impacts, Adaptation and Vulnerability.
- Contribution of Working Group III (WGIII): Climate Change 2007: Mitigation of Climate Change.
- Contribution of Working Groups I, II, and III: The Synthesis Report (SYR).

== Working Group I: The Physical Science Basis ==
The full WGI report was published in March 2007, and last updated in September of that year. It includes a Summary for Policymakers (SPM), which was published in February 2007, and a Frequently Asked Questions section.

This section of the report, Climate Change 2007: The Physical Science Basis, assessed current scientific knowledge of "the natural and human drivers of climate change" as well as observed changes in climate. It looked at the ability of science to attribute changes to different causes, and made projections of future climate change.

It was produced by 676 authors (152 lead authors, 26 review editors, and 498 contributing authors) from 40 countries, then reviewed by over 625 expert reviewers. More than 6,000 peer-reviewed publications were cited.

Before being approved, the summary was reviewed line by line by representatives of 113 governments during the 10th session of WGI, in January to February 2007.

On the issue of global warming and its causes, the SPM states that:

- "Warming of the climate system is unequivocal."
- "Most of the observed increase in global average temperatures since the mid-20th century is very likely due to the observed increase in anthropogenic greenhouse gas concentrations."

Very likely and likely mean "the assessed likelihood, using expert judgment" are over 90% and over 66%, respectively.

=== Observations ===
The report notes many observed changes in the Earth's climate including atmospheric composition, global average temperatures, ocean conditions, and other climate changes.

==== Changes in the atmosphere ====
Carbon dioxide, methane, and nitrous oxide are all long-lived greenhouse gases.

- "Carbon dioxide, methane, and nitrous oxide have increased markedly as a result of human activities since 1750 and now far exceed pre-industrial values."
- The amount of carbon dioxide in the atmosphere in 2005 (379 ppm) exceeds by far the natural range of the last 650,000 years (180 to 300 ppm).
- The amount of methane in the atmosphere in 2005 (1774 ppb) exceeds by far the natural range of the last 650,000 years (320 to 790 ppb).
- The primary source of the increase in carbon dioxide is fossil fuel use, but land-use changes also make a contribution.
- The primary source of the increase in methane is very likely to be a combination of human agricultural activities and fossil fuel use. How much each contributes is not well determined.
- Nitrous oxide concentrations have risen from a pre-industrial value of 270 ppb to a 2005 value of 319 ppb. More than a third of this rise is due to human activity, primarily agriculture.

==== Warming of the planet ====
Cold days, cold nights, and frost events have become less frequent. Hot days, hot nights, and heat waves have become more frequent. Additionally:

- Eleven of the twelve years in the period (1995–2006) rank among the top 12 warmest years in the instrumental record (since 1880).
- Warming in the last 100 years has caused about a 0.74 °C increase in global average temperature. This is up from the 0.6 °C increase in the 100 years prior to the Third Assessment Report.
- Urban heat island effects were determined to have negligible influence (less than 0.0006 °C per decade over land and zero over oceans) on these measurements.
- Observations since 1961 show that the ocean has been absorbing more than 80% of the heat added to the climate system, and that ocean temperatures have increased to depths of at least 3000 m (9800 ft).
- "Average Arctic temperatures increased at almost twice the global average rate in the past 100 years."
- It is likely that greenhouse gases would have caused more warming than we have observed if not for the cooling effects of volcanic and human-caused aerosols. See global dimming.
- Average Northern Hemisphere temperatures during the second half of the 20th century were very likely higher than during any other 50-year period in the last 500 years and likely the highest in at least the past 1300 years (including both the Medieval Warm Period and the Little Ice Age).

==== Ice, snow, permafrost, rain, and the oceans ====
The SPM documents increases in wind intensity, decline of permafrost coverage, and increases of both drought and heavy precipitation events. Additionally:

- "Mountain glaciers and snow cover have declined on average in both hemispheres."
- Losses from the land-based ice sheets of Greenland and Antarctica have very likely (>90%) contributed to sea level rise between 1993 and 2003.
- Ocean warming causes seawater to expand, which contributes to sea level rising.
- Sea level rose at an average rate of about 1.8 mm/year during the years 1961–2003. The rise in sea level during 1993–2003 was at an average rate of 3.1 mm/year. It is not clear whether this is a long-term trend or just variability.
- Antarctic sea ice shows no significant overall trend, consistent with a lack of warming in that region.

==== Hurricanes ====
- There has been an increase in hurricane intensity in the North Atlantic since the 1970s, and that increase correlates with increases in sea surface temperature.
- The observed increase in hurricane intensity is larger than climate models predict for the sea surface temperature changes we have experienced.
- There is no clear trend in the number of hurricanes.
- Other regions appear to have experienced increased hurricane intensity as well, but there are concerns about the quality of data in these other regions.
- It is more likely than not (>50%) that there has been some human contribution to the increases in hurricane intensity.
- It is likely (>66%) that we will see increases in hurricane intensity during the 21st century.

Table SPM-2 lists recent trends along with certainty levels for the trend having actually occurred, for a human contribution to the trend, and for the trend occurring in the future. In relation to changes (including increased hurricane intensity) where the certainty of a human contribution is stated as "more likely than not" footnote f to table SPM-2 notes "Magnitude of anthropogenic contributions not assessed. Attribution for these phenomena based on expert judgment rather than formal attribution studies."

=== Factors that warm or cool the planet ===
Changes in radiative forcings between 1750 and 2005 as estimated by the IPCC

AR4 describes warming and cooling effects on the planet in terms of radiative forcing—the rate of change of energy in the system, measured as power per unit area (in SI units, W/m^{2}). The report shows in detail the individual warming contributions (positive forcing) of carbon dioxide, methane, nitrous oxide, halocarbons, other human warming factors, and the warming effects of changes in solar activity. Also shown are the cooling effects (negative forcing) of aerosols, land-use changes, and other human activities. All values are shown as a change from pre-industrial conditions.

- Total radiative forcing from the sum of all human activities is about +1.6 watts/m^{2}
- Radiative forcing from an increase of solar intensity since 1750 is about +0.12 watts/m^{2}
- Radiative forcing from carbon dioxide, methane, and nitrous oxide combined is very likely (>90%) increasing more quickly during the current era (1750–present) than at any other time in the last 10,000 years.

=== Climate sensitivity ===
Climate sensitivity is defined as the amount of global average surface warming following a doubling of carbon dioxide concentrations. It is likely to be in the range of 2 to 4.5 °C, with a best estimate of about 3 °C. This range of values is not a projection of the temperature rise we will see in the 21st century, since the future change in carbon dioxide concentrations is unknown, and factors besides carbon dioxide concentrations affect temperature.

=== Model-based projections for the future ===
Model projections are made based on an analysis of various computer climate models running within the different scenarios that were established in 2000 in the Special Report on Emissions Scenarios (the "SRES scenarios"). As a result, predictions for the 21st century are as shown below.

- Surface air warming in the 21st century:
  - Best estimate for a "low scenario" is 1.8 °C with a likely range of 1.1 to 2.9 °C (3.2 °F with a likely range of 2.0 to 5.2 °F)
  - Best estimate for a "high scenario" is 4.0 °C with a likely range of 2.4 to 6.4 °C (7.2 °F with a likely range of 4.3 to 11.5 °F)
  - A temperature rise of about 0.1 °C per decade would be expected for the next two decades, even if greenhouse gas and aerosol concentrations were kept at year 2000 levels.
  - A temperature rise of about 0.2 °C per decade is projected for the next two decades for all SRES scenarios.
  - Confidence in these near-term projections is strengthened because of the agreement between past model projections and actual observed temperature increases.
- Based on multiple models that all exclude ice sheet flow due to a lack of basis in published literature, it is estimated that sea level rise will be:
  - in a low scenario 18 to 38 cm (7 to 15 inches)
  - in a high scenario 26 to 59 cm (10 to 23 inches)
- It is very likely that there will be an increase in frequency of warm spells, heat waves and events of heavy rainfall.
- It is likely that there will be an increase in areas affected by droughts, intensity of tropical cyclones (which include hurricanes and typhoons) and the occurrence of extreme high tides.
- "Sea ice is projected to shrink in both the Arctic and Antarctic ... In some projections, Arctic late-summer sea ice disappears almost entirely by the latter part of the 21st century."

Scenario-specific projections are based on analysis of multiple runs by multiple climate models, using the various SRES Scenarios. "Low scenario" refers to B1, the most optimistic scenario family. "High scenario" refers to A1FI, the most pessimistic scenario family.

==== Temperature and sea level rise in the various scenarios ====
There are six families of SRES scenarios, and AR4 provides projected temperature and sea level rises (excluding future rapid dynamical changes in ice flow) for each scenario family.

- Scenario B1
  - Best estimate temperature rise of 1.8 °C with a likely range of 1.1 to 2.9 °C (3.2 °F with a likely range of 2.0 to 5.2 °F)
  - Sea level rise likely range [18 to 38 cm] (7 to 15 inches)
- Scenario A1T
  - Best estimate temperature rise of 2.4 °C with a likely range of 1.4 to 3.8 °C (4.3 °F with a likely range of 2.5 to 6.8 °F)
  - Sea level rise likely range [20 to 45 cm] (8 to 18 inches)
- Scenario B2
  - Best estimate temperature rise of 2.4 °C with a likely range of 1.4 to 3.8 °C (4.3 °F with a likely range of 2.5 to 6.8 °F)
  - Sea level rise likely range [20 to 43 cm] (8 to 17 inches)
- Scenario A1B
  - Best estimate temperature rise of 2.8 °C with a likely range of 1.7 to 4.4 °C (5.0 °F with a likely range of 3.1 to 7.9 °F)
  - Sea level rise likely range [21 to 48 cm] (8 to 19 inches)
- Scenario A2
  - Best estimate temperature rise of 3.4 °C with a likely range of 2.0 to 5.4 °C (6.1 °F with a likely range of 3.6 to 9.7 °F)
  - Sea level rise likely range [23 to 51 cm] (9 to 20 inches)
- Scenario A1FI
  - Best estimate temperature rise of 4.0 °C with a likely range of 2.4 to 6.4 °C (7.2 °F with a likely range of 4.3 to 11.5 °F)
  - Sea level rise likely range [26 to 59 cm] (10 to 23 inches)

=== Selected quotes from the Working Group I Summary for Policymakers ===
- "Both past and future anthropogenic carbon dioxide emissions will continue to contribute to warming and sea level rise for more than a millennium, due to the timescales required for removal of this gas from the atmosphere."

=== Reaction to Working Group I ===
In the weeks before publication of the first report, controversy broke out about the report's projections of sea-level change, which in the new report was estimated at less than previous estimates. The now-published text gives a warning that the new estimation of sea-level could be too low: "Dynamical processes related to ice flow not included in current models but suggested by recent observations could increase the vulnerability of the ice sheets to warming, increasing future sea level rise." The mid-points of the sea level rise estimates are within ±10% of those from the TAR; but the range has narrowed.

Lord Rees, the president of the Royal Society, said, "This report makes it clear, more convincingly than ever before, that human actions are writ large on the changes we are seeing, and will see, to our climate. The IPCC strongly emphasises that substantial climate change is inevitable, and we will have to adapt to this. This should compel all of us—world leaders, businesses and individuals—towards action rather than the paralysis of fear. We need both to reduce our emissions of greenhouse gases and to prepare for the impacts of climate change. Those who would claim otherwise can no longer use science as a basis for their argument."

U.S. Energy Secretary Samuel Bodman told a news conference that the report was "sound science" and "As the president has said, and this report makes clear, human activity is contributing to changes in our earth's climate and that issue is no longer up for debate." Kurt Volker, Principal Deputy Assistant Secretary for European and Eurasian Affairs, said, "We support the recent IPCC report, in which U.S. scientists played a leading role."

Based on the report, 46 countries in a "Paris Call for Action" read out by French President Chirac, have called for the creation of a United Nations Environment Organization (UNEO), which is to have more power than the current United Nations Environment Programme (UNEP), and is to be modelled after the more powerful World Health Organization. The 46 countries included the European Union nations, but notably did not include the United States, China, Russia, and India, the top four emitters of greenhouse gases.

== Working Group II: Impacts, Adaptation and Vulnerability ==
Working Group II's Summary for Policymakers was released on 6 April 2007. The full report was released 18 September 2007.

WGII states that "evidence from all continents and most oceans shows that many natural systems are being affected by regional climate changes, particularly temperature increases".

=== Observations ===
Some observed changes have been associated with climate change at varying levels of confidence.

With a high confidence (about an 8 in 10 chance to be correct) WGII asserts that climate change has resulted in:

- More and larger glacial lakes.
- Increasing ground instability in permafrost regions.
- Increasing rock avalanches in mountain regions.
- Changes in some Arctic and Antarctic ecosystems.
- Increased run-off and earlier spring peak discharge in many glacier and snow-fed rivers.
- Changes affecting algae, plankton, fish and zooplankton because rising water temperatures and changes in:
  - ice cover
  - salinity
  - oxygen levels
  - water circulation

With a very high confidence (about a 9 in 10 chance to be correct) WGII asserts that climate change is affecting terrestrial biological systems in that:

- Spring events such as the unfolding of leaves, laying of eggs, and migration are happening earlier.
- There are poleward and upward (to higher altitude) shifts in ranges of plant and animal species.

WGII also states that the ocean has become more acidic because it has absorbed human-caused carbon dioxide. Ocean pH has dropped by 0.1, but how this affects marine life is not documented.

=== Attribution of changes ===
WGII acknowledges some of the difficulties of attributing specific changes to human-caused global warming, stating that "Limitations and gaps prevent more complete attribution of the causes of observed system responses to anthropogenic warming." but found that the agreement between observed and projected changes was "Nevertheless ... sufficient to conclude with high confidence that anthropogenic warming over the last three decades has had a discernible influence on many physical and biological systems."

=== Projections ===
WGII describes some of what might be expected in the coming century, based on studies and model projections.

==== Fresh water ====
It is projected with high confidence that:

- Dry regions are projected to get drier, and wet regions are projected to get wetter: "By mid-century, annual average river runoff and water availability are projected to increase by 10–40% at high latitudes and in some wet tropical areas, and decrease by 10–30% over some dry regions at mid-latitudes and in the dry tropics..."
- Drought-affected areas will become larger.
- Heavy precipitation events are very likely to become more common and will increase flood risk.
- Water supplies stored in glaciers and snow cover will be reduced over the course of the century.

==== Ecosystems ====
It is projected with high confidence that:

- The resilience of many ecosystems is likely to be exceeded this century by a combination of climate change and other stressors.
- Carbon removal by terrestrial ecosystems is likely to peak before mid-century and then weaken or reverse. This would amplify climate change.

==== Food ====
It is projected with medium confidence (about 5 in 10 chance to be correct) that globally, potential food production will increase for temperature rises of 1–3 °C, but decrease for higher temperature ranges.

==== Coastal systems ====
It is projected with very high confidence that:

- Coasts will be exposed to increasing risks such as coastal erosion due to climate change and sea-level rise.
- "Increases in sea-surface temperature of about 1–3 °C are projected to result in more frequent coral bleaching events and widespread mortality unless there is thermal adaptation or acclimatisation by corals."
- "Many millions more people are projected to be flooded every year due to sea-level rise by the 2080s."

=== Objections to original WGII language ===
US negotiators managed to eliminate language calling for cuts in greenhouse gas emissions, according to Patricia Romero Lankao, a lead author from the National Center for Atmospheric Research (NCAR). The original draft read: "However, adaptation alone is not expected to cope with all the projected effects of climate change, and especially not over the long run as most impacts increase in magnitude. Mitigation measures will therefore also be required." The second sentence does not appear in the final version of the report.

China objected to wording that said "based on observed evidence, there is very high confidence that many natural systems, on all continents and in most oceans, are being affected by regional climate changes, particularly temperature increases". When China asked that the word "very" be stricken, three scientific authors balked, and the deadlock was broken only by a compromise to delete any reference to confidence levels.

== Working Group III: Mitigation of Climate Change ==
Working Group III's Summary for Policymakers (SPM) was published on 4 May 2007 at the 26th session of the IPCC. The full WG III report was published online in September 2007.

The IPCC convened in Bangkok on April 30 to start discussions on the draft Summary, with the participation of over 400 scientists and experts from about 120 countries. At the full IPCC meeting on May 4, agreement was reached by the larger gathering of some 2,000 delegates. One of the key debates concerned a proposal to limit concentrations of greenhouse gases in the atmosphere to between 445 parts per million and 650 parts per million to avoid dangerous climate change, with pressure from developing countries to raise the lower limit. Despite this, the figures from the original proposal were incorporated into the Summary for Policymakers. The Summary concludes that stabilization of greenhouse gas concentrations is possible at a reasonable cost, with stabilization between 445 ppm and 535 ppm costing less than 3% of global GDP.

The WG III report analyses mitigation options for the main sectors in the near-term, addressing also cross-sectorial matters such as synergies, co-benefits, and trade-offs. It also provides information on long-term mitigation strategies for various stabilization levels, paying special attention to implications of different short-term strategies for achieving long-term goals.

=== Mitigation in the short and medium term (until 2030) ===
The Summary for Policymakers concludes that there was a high level of agreement and much evidence that "there is substantial economic potential for the mitigation of global greenhouse gas emissions over the coming decades, that could offset the projected growth of global emissions or reduce emissions below current levels", taking into account financial and social costs and benefits. The technologies with the largest economic potential within this timescale are considered to be:

Key mitigation technologies and practices by sector
Sector	Key mitigation technologies and practices currently commercially available	Key mitigation technologies and practices projected to be commercialized before 2030
Energy Supply	Improved supply and distribution efficiency; fuel switching from coal to gas; nuclear power; renewable heat and power (hydropower, solar, wind, geothermal and bioenergy); combined heat and power; early applications of CCS (e.g. storage of removed CO_{2} from natural gas)	Carbon Capture and Storage (CCS) for gas, biomass and coal-fired electricity generating facilities; advanced nuclear power; advanced renewable energy, including tidal and waves energy, concentrating solar, and solar PV.
Transport	More fuel efficient vehicles; electric vehicle; hybrid vehicles; cleaner diesel vehicles; biofuels; modal shifts from road transport to rail and public transport systems; non-motorised transport (cycling, walking); land-use and transport planning	Second generation biofuels; higher efficiency aircraft; advanced electric and hybrid vehicles with more powerful and reliable batteries
Buildings	Efficient lighting and daylighting; more efficient electrical appliances and heating and cooling devices; improved cook stoves, improved insulation; passive and active solar design for heating and cooling; alternative refrigeration fluids, recovery and recycle of fluorinated gases	Integrated design of commercial buildings including technologies, such as intelligent meters that provide feedback and control; solar PV integrated in buildings
Industry	More efficient end-use electrical equipment; heat and power recovery; material recycling and substitution; control of non-CO_{2} gas emissions; and a wide array of process-specific technologies	Advanced energy efficiency; CCS for cement, ammonia, and iron manufacture; inert electrodes for aluminium manufacture
Agriculture	Improved crop and grazing land management to increase soil carbon storage; restoration of cultivated peaty soils and degraded lands; improved rice cultivation techniques and livestock and manure management to reduce CH_{4} emissions; improved nitrogen fertilizer application techniques to reduce N_{2}O emissions; dedicated energy crops to replace fossil fuel use; improved energy efficiency	Improvements of crop yields
Forestry/forests	Afforestation; reforestation; forest management; reduced deforestation; harvested wood product management; use of forestry products for bio-energy to replace fossil fuel use	Tree species improvement to increase biomass productivity and carbon biosequestration. Improved remote sensing technologies for analysis of vegetation/ soil carbon sequestration potential and mapping land use change
Waste	Landfill methane recovery; waste incineration with energy recovery; composting of organic waste; controlled waste water treatment; recycling and waste minimization	Biocovers and biofilters to optimize CH_{4} oxidation

The IPCC estimates that stabilizing atmospheric greenhouse gases at between 445–535 ppm CO_{2} equivalent would result in a reduction of average annual GDP growth rates of less than 0.12%. Stabilizing at 535 to 590 ppm would reduce average annual GDP growth rates by 0.1%, while stabilization at 590 to 710 ppm would reduce rates by 0.06%. There was high agreement and much evidence that a substantial fraction of these mitigation costs may be offset by benefits to health as a result of reduced air pollution, and that there would be further cost savings from other benefits such as increased energy security, increased agricultural production, and reduced pressure on natural ecosystems as well as, in certain countries, balance of trade improvements, provision of modern energy services to rural areas and employment.

The IPCC considered that achieving these reductions would require a "large shift in the pattern of investment, although the net additional investment required ranges from negligible to 5–10%".They also concluded that it is often more cost effective to invest in end-use energy efficiency improvement than in increasing energy supply.

In terms of electricity generation, the IPCC envisage that renewable energy can provide 30 to 35% of electricity by 2030 (up from 18% in 2005) at a carbon price of up to US$50/t, and that nuclear power can rise from 16% to 18%. They also warn that higher oil prices might lead to the exploitation of high-carbon alternatives such as oil sands, oil shales, heavy oils, and synthetic fuels from coal and gas, leading to increasing emissions, unless carbon capture and storage technologies are employed.

In the transport sector there was a medium level of agreement and evidence that the multiple mitigation options may be counteracted by increased use, and that there were many barriers and a lack of government policy frameworks.

There was high agreement and much evidence that, despite many barriers (particularly in the developing countries), new and existing buildings could reduce emissions considerably, and that this would also provide other benefits in terms of improved air quality, social welfare and energy security.

=== Mitigation in the long term (after 2030) ===
The IPCC reported that the effectiveness of mitigation efforts over the next two or three decades would have a large impact on the ability to stabilize atmospheric greenhouse gases at lower levels, and that the lower the ultimate stabilization levels, the more quickly emissions would need to peak and decline. For example, to stabilize at between 445 and 490 ppm (resulting in an estimate global temperature 2 to 2.4 °C above the pre-industrial average) emissions would need to peak before 2015, with 50 to 85% reductions on 2000 levels by 2050.

There was high agreement and much evidence that stabilization could be achieved by 2050 using currently available technologies, provided appropriate and effective incentives were put in place for their development, acquisition, deployment and diffusion, and that barriers were removed. For stabilization at lower levels the IPCC agreed that improvements of carbon intensity need to be made much faster than has been the case in the past, and that there would be a greater need for efficient public and private research, development and demonstration efforts and investment in new technologies during the next few decades. The IPCC points out that government funding in real absolute terms for most energy research programmes has been flat or declining for nearly 20 years, and is now about half the 1980 level. Delays in cutting emissions would lead to higher stabilization levels and increase the risk of more severe climate change impacts, as more of the current high-emission technologies would have been deployed.

Among the measures that might be used, there was high agreement and much evidence that policies that put a price on the cost of carbon emissions could provide incentives for consumers and producers. Carbon prices of 5 to 65 US$/tCO_{2} in 2030 and 15 to 130 US$/tCO_{2} by 2050 are envisaged for stabilization at around 550 ppm by 2100.

== Synthesis Report ==
A draft version of the Synthesis Report, said to be subject to final copyedit, was published on 16 November 2007.

The Synthesis Report goes one step further [than the first three Climate Change 2007 Working Group Reports]: it is the decisive effort to integrate and compact this wealth of information into a readable and concise document explicitly targeted to the policymakers.

The Synthesis Report also brings in relevant parts some material contained in the full Working Group Reports over and above what is included in the Summary for Policymakers in these three Reports. It is designed to be a powerful, scientifically authoritative document of high policy relevance, which will be a major contribution to the discussions at the 13th Conference of the Parties in Bali during December 2007. In fact, this Conference was postponed to December to allow the IPCC Synthesis Report to come out first.

— Press conference for the release of the IPCC Synthesis Report

The six topics addressed in the Synthesis Report are:

1. Observed changes in climate and its effects (WGI and WGII).
2. Causes of change (WGI and WGIII).
3. Climate change and its impacts in the near and long term under different scenarios (WGI and WGIII).
4. Adaptation and mitigation options and responses, and the inter-relationship with sustainable development, at global and regional levels (WGII and WGIII).
5. The long term perspective: scientific and socio-economic aspects relevant to adaptation and mitigation, consistent with the objectives and provisions of the Convention [sic], and in the context of sustainable development (WGI and WGIII).
6. Robust findings, key uncertainties (WGI, WGII and WGIII).

The "Convention" mentioned in Topic 5 is the UN Framework Convention on Climate Change (UNFCCC).

The key findings from the AR4 Synthesis Report will be discussed Wednesday 13 December 2007 at the United Nations Climate Change Conference (UNFCCC COP 13—CMP 3) in Bali, Indonesia, which takes place 3–14 December (see UNFCCC home page).

=== Anthropogenic warming could lead to some impacts that are abrupt or irreversible ===
The SPM states that "Anthropogenic warming could lead to some impacts that are abrupt or irreversible, depending upon the rate and magnitude of the climate change."

- "There is medium confidence that approximately 20–30% of species assessed so far are likely to be at increased risk of extinction if increases in global average warming exceed 1.5–2.5°C (relative to 1980–1999). As global average temperature increase exceeds about 3.5°C, model projections suggest significant extinctions (40–70% of species assessed) around the globe."
- "Partial loss of ice sheets on polar land could imply metres of sea level rise, major changes in coastlines and inundation of low-lying areas, with greatest effects in river deltas and low-lying islands. Such changes are projected to occur over millennial time scales, but more rapid sea level rise on century time scales cannot be excluded."

=== Change in greenhouse gas concentrations and effect ===
The following table is based on Chapter 2 of the Working Group 1 Report.

	Mole fractions and their changes		Radiative forcing	
Species	2005	Change since 1998	2005 (W m^{−2})	1998 (%)
CO_{2}	379 ± 0.65 μmol/mol	+13 μmol/mol	1.66	+13
CH_{4}	1,774 ± 1.8 nmol/mol	+11 nmol/mol	0.48	–
N_{2}O	319 ± 0.12 nmol/mol	+5 nmol/mol	0.16	+11
CFC-11	251 ± 0.36 pmol/mol	−13	0.063	−5
CFC-12	538 ± 0.18 pmol/mol	+4	0.17	+1
CFC-113	79 ± 0.064 pmol/mol	−4	0.024	−5
HCFC-22	169 ± 1.0 pmol/mol	+38	0.033	+29
HCFC-141b	18 ± 0.068 pmol/mol	+9	0.0025	+93
HCFC-142b	15 ± 0.13 pmol/mol	+6	0.0031	+57
CH_{3}CCl_{3}	19 ± 0.47 pmol/mol	−47	0.0011	−72
CCl_{4}	93 ± 0.17 pmol/mol	−7	0.012	−7
HFC-125	3.7 ± 0.10 pmol/mol	+2.6	0.0009	+234
HFC-134a	35 ± 0.73 pmol/mol	+27	0.0055	+349
HFC-152a	3.9 ± 0.11 pmol/mol	+2.4	0.0004	+151
HFC-23	18 ± 0.12 pmol/mol	+4	0.0033	+29
SF_{6}	5.6 ± 0.038 pmol/mol	+1.5	0.0029	+36
CF_{4} (PFC-14)	74 ± 1.6 pmol/mol	–	0.0034	–
C_{2}F_{6} (PFC-116)	2.9 ± 0.025 pmol/mol	+0.5	0.0008	+22

== Reception ==
The New York Times reported that "the leading international network of climate scientists has concluded for the first time that global warming is 'unequivocal' and that human activity is the main driver, 'very likely' causing most of the rise in temperatures since 1950".

The same newspaper wrote: "The Intergovernmental Panel on Climate Change said the likelihood was 90 percent to 99 percent that emissions of heat-trapping greenhouse gases like carbon dioxide, spewed from tailpipes and smokestacks, were the dominant cause of the observed warming of the last 50 years. In the panel's parlance, this level of certainty is labeled 'very likely'. Only rarely does scientific odds-making provide a more definite answer than that, at least in this branch of science, and it describes the endpoint, so far, of a progression."

The Associated Press summarized the position on sea level rise:

On sea levels, the report projects rises of 7 to 23 inches by the end of the century. An additional 3.9 to 7.8 inches are possible if recent, surprising melting of polar ice sheets continues.

The Fourth Assessment Report has been the subject of criticism. Skeptics of anthropogenic global warming contend that their claims are not sufficiently incorporated in the report. Others regard the IPCC as too conservative in its estimates of potential harm from climate change. The report has also been criticized for inclusion of an erroneous date for the projected demise of the Himalayan glaciers.

Related to the subject of global warming in general, the IPCC Fourth Assessment Report has been discussed by various bodies such as government officials, special interest groups and scientific organizations; see the article "Politics of global warming" for a thorough discussion of the politics surrounding the phenomenon, and the positions of the various parties involved.

The United Nations appointed an independent board of scientists to "review the workings of the world's top climate science panel" which reported in September 2010; see Intergovernmental Panel on Climate Change#InterAcademy Council review in 2010.

=== Response to AR4 ===
Several science academies have referred to and/or reiterated some of the conclusions of AR4. These include:

- Joint-statements made in 2007, 2008 and 2009 by the science academies of Brazil, China, India, Mexico, South Africa and the G8 nations (the "G8+5").
- Publications by the Australian Academy of Science.
- A joint-statement made in 2007 by the Network of African Science Academies.
- A statement made in 2010 by the Inter Academy Medical Panel This statement has been signed by 43 scientific academies. (Note: Academia Nacional de Medicina de Buenos Aires; Academy of Medical Sciences of Armenia; Austrian Academy of Sciences; Bangladesh Academy of Sciences; Academia Boliviana de Medicina; Brazilian Academy of Sciences; Cameroon Academy of Sciences; Chinese Academy of Engineering; Academia Nacional de Medicina de Colombia; Croatian Academy of Medical Sciences; Croatian Academy of Sciences and Arts; Academy of Scientific Research and Technology, Egypt; Académie Nationale de Médecine, France; The Delegation of the Finnish Academies of Science and Letters; Union of German Academies of Sciences and Humanities; Deutsche Akademie der Naturforscher, Leopoldina; Academia de Ciencias Medicas, Fisicas y Naturales de Guatemala; Hungarian Academy of Sciences; Indonesian Academy of Sciences; Accademia Nazionale dei Lincei; TWAS, academy of sciences for the developing world; Islamic World Academy of Sciences; Science Council of Japan; African Academy of Sciences; Kenya National Academy of Sciences; The National Academy of Sciences, Rep. of Korea; Akademi Sains Malaysia; National Academy of Medicine of Mexico; Nigerian Academy of Science; National Academy of Science and Technology, Philippines; Polish Academy of Sciences; The Caribbean Academy of Sciences; Russian Academy of Medical Sciences; Slovenian Academy of Sciences and Arts; Academy of Science of South Africa; National Academy of Sciences of Sri Lanka; Royal Swedish Academy of Sciences; The Tanzania Academy of Sciences; Thai Academy of Science and Technology; Turkish Academy of Sciences; Uganda National Academy Sciences; Academy of Medical Sciences, UK; Institute of Medicine, US NAS)

The Netherlands Environmental Assessment Agency (PBL, et al., 2009; 2010) has carried out two reviews of AR4. These reviews are generally supportive of AR4's conclusions. PBL (2010) make some recommendations to improve the IPCC process. A literature assessment by the US National Research Council (US NRC, 2010) concludes:

Climate change is occurring, is caused largely by human activities, and poses significant risks for—and in many cases is already affecting—a broad range of human and natural systems [emphasis in original text]. ... This conclusion is based on a substantial array of scientific evidence, including recent work, and is consistent with the conclusions of recent assessments by the U.S. Global Change Research Program ..., the Intergovernmental Panel on Climate Change's Fourth Assessment Report ..., and other assessments of the state of scientific knowledge on climate change.

=== Projected date of melting of Himalayan glaciers ===
Some errors have been found in the IPCC AR4 Working Group II report. Two errors include the melting of Himalayan glaciers (see later section), and Dutch land area that is below sea level.

A paragraph in the 2007 Working Group II report ("Impacts, Adaptation and Vulnerability"), chapter 10 included a projection that Himalayan glaciers could disappear by 2035:

Glaciers in the Himalaya are receding faster than in any other part of the world (see Table 10.9) and, if the present rate continues, the likelihood of them disappearing by the year 2035 and perhaps sooner is very high if the Earth keeps warming at the current rate. Its total area will likely shrink from the present 500,000 to 100,000 km^{2} by the year 2035 (WWF, 2005).

This projection was not included in the final summary for policymakers. The IPCC has since acknowledged that the date is incorrect, while reaffirming that the conclusion in the final summary was robust. They expressed regret for "the poor application of well-established IPCC procedures in this instance". The date of 2035 has been correctly quoted by the IPCC from the WWF report, which has misquoted its own source, an ICSI report "Variations of Snow and Ice in the past and at present on a Global and Regional Scale".

Rajendra K. Pachauri responded in an interview with Science.

=== Overstatement of effects ===
Former IPCC chairman Robert Watson said, regarding the Himalayan glaciers estimation, "The mistakes all appear to have gone in the direction of making it seem like climate change is more serious by overstating the impact. That is worrying. The IPCC needs to look at this trend in the errors and ask why it happened". Martin Parry, a climate expert who had been co-chair of the IPCC working group II, said that "What began with a single unfortunate error over Himalayan glaciers has become a clamour without substance" and the IPCC had investigated the other alleged mistakes, which were "generally unfounded and also marginal to the assessment".

=== Other ===
The IPCC Fourth Assessment Report featured a graph showing 12 proxy based temperature reconstructions, including the three highlighted in the 2001 Third Assessment Report (TAR); Mann, Bradley & Hughes 1999 as before, Jones et al. 1998 and Briffa 2000 had both been calibrated by newer studies. In addition, analysis of the Medieval Warm Period cited reconstructions by Crowley & Lowery 2000 (as cited in the TAR) and Osborn & Briffa 2006. Ten of these 14 reconstructions covered 1,000 years or longer. Most reconstructions shared some data series, particularly tree ring data, but newer reconstructions used additional data and covered a wider area, using a variety of statistical methods. The section discussed the divergence problem affecting certain tree ring data.

== See also ==
- Avoiding Dangerous Climate Change
- Individual and political action on climate change
- Business action on climate change
- Energy policy
- Energy conservation
- Global climate model
- Post–Kyoto Protocol negotiations on greenhouse gas emissions
- Precautionary principle
- Renewable Energy Sources and Climate Change Mitigation
- Special Report on Emissions Scenarios
- World energy resources and consumption
