= Jean-Pierre Dupuy =

French engineer, epistemologist and philosopher

- Born: February 20, 1941
- Education: Ecole polytechnique, Ecole des Mines
- Occupations: French engineer and philosopher

Jean-Pierre Dupuy (born February 20, 1941) is a French engineer and philosopher.

== Biography ==
Dupuy attended the Ecole polytechnique, where he graduated in 1965 and attended the Ecole des Mines. He is an associate at the Center for the Study of Language and Information (CSLI) of Stanford University, California and is also attached to the Science and Technology Studies program. He also taught social and political philosophy and the ethics of science and technology until 2006 at the École Polytechnique.

He founded the center of cognitive sciences and epistemology of the Ecole polytechnique (CREA) in 1982 with Jean-Marie Domenach on the basis of preliminary reflections by Jean Ullmo. This center became a mixed research unit in 1987. From the outset, its vocation was two-fold and involved both modeling in human sciences (models of self-organization of complex systems) and the philosophy of science (in particular, the epistemology of cognitive sciences).

== Awards ==
- 2011 : prix Roger-Caillois
- member of Académie des technologies and French Catholic Academy.
- Dupuy was inducted as an Academician into the International Academy for Systems and Cybernetic Sciences.

== Work ==
- With Hubert Lévy-Lambert, Les Choix économiques dans l'entreprise et dans l'administration, Dunod, 1973.
- With Serge Karsenty, L'Invasion pharmaceutique, Seuil, « Points » 1977.
- « À la recherche du temps gagné », in Ivan Illich, Énergie et Équité, 1974.
- Valeur sociale et encombrement du temps, éditions du CNRS, 1975.
- With Jean Robert, La Trahison de l'opulence, Puf, 1976 ISBN 2-13-034946-3.
- With Paul Dumouchel, L'Enfer des choses, Seuil, 1979 ISBN 2-02-005320-9.
- Introduction à la critique de l'écologie politique, Civilizaçao Brasileira, Rio de Janeiro, 1980.
- Ordres et Désordres, enquête sur un nouveau paradigme, Seuil, 1982. ISBN 978-2-02-010923-9.
- With Michel Deguy (dir.), René Girard et le Problème du mal, Grasset, 1982 ISBN 978-2-246-24971-9.
- La Panique, Les Empêcheurs de Penser en Rond, 1991 ISBN 978-2-84671-062-6.
- Le Sacrifice et l'Envie. Le libéralisme aux prises avec la justice sociale, Paris, Calmann-Lévy, 1992.

– Réédition sous le titre Libéralisme et justice sociale, Hachette Pluriel ISBN 978-2-01-270516-6.

- Introduction aux sciences sociales. Logique des phénomènes collectifs, Ellipses, 1992 ISBN 978-2-7298-9226-5.
- Aux origines des sciences cognitives, La Découverte, 1994 ISBN 978-2-7071-4775-2 (2005).
- Éthique et philosophie de l'action, Ellipses, 1999.
- Les savants croient-ils en leurs théories ? Une lecture philosophique de l'histoire des sciences cognitives, INRA Éditions, 2000.
- Avions-nous oublié le mal ? Penser la politique après le 11 septembre, Bayard, 2002 ISBN 978-2-227-47044-6.
- Pour un catastrophisme éclairé. Quand l'impossible est certain, Seuil, 2004 ISBN 978-2-02-066046-4.
- Petite métaphysique des tsunamis, Seuil, 2005 ISBN 978-2-02-082169-8.
- Retour de Tchernobyl. Journal d'un homme en colère, Seuil, 2006 ISBN 978-2-02-087969-9.
- La Marque du sacré : essai sur une dénégation, Carnets nord, 2009 ISBN 978-2-35536-014-5.
- Dans l'œil du cyclone – colloque de Cerisy, Carnets nord, 2009 ISBN 978-2-35536-020-6.
- L'Avenir de l'économie : sortir de l'économystification, Flammarion, 2012 ISBN 978-2081253452.
- La jalousie : Une géométrie du désir, Seuil, 2016 ISBN 978-2021038316.
