= David Henderson (economist) =

British economist

Patrick David Henderson CMG (10 April 1927 – 30 September 2018) was a British economist. He was the chief economist at the Economics and Statistics Department at the OECD during 1984–1992. Before that he worked as an academic economist in Britain, first at Oxford (Fellow of Lincoln College) and later at University College London (Professor of Economics, 1975–1983); as a British civil servant (first as an Economic Advisor in HM Treasury, and later as Chief Economist in the Ministry of Aviation); and as a staff member of the World Bank (1969–1975). In 1985 he gave the BBC Reith Lectures, which were published in the book Innocence and Design: The Influence of Economic Ideas on Policy (Blackwell, 1986).

After leaving the OECD in 1992, Henderson became an independent author and consultant and was a visiting fellow or professor at the Centre for European Policy Studies, Monash University, the Fondation Nationale des Sciences Politiques, the Royal Institute of International Affairs, the New Zealand Business Roundtable and Westminster Business School.

In 1992, Henderson was appointed to the Order of St Michael and St George as a Companion (CMG).

Henderson has published books that strongly criticize "corporate social responsibility" (see §Books, below).

Henderson and Nigel Lawson appealed to then-Prime Minister Tony Blair to investigate the economic implications of the potential implementation of policies put forth by the UN Intergovernmental Panel on Climate Change (IPCC) findings.

Henderson and Ian Castles, a former head of the Australian Bureau of Statistics argued that the IPCC's projections of future emissions of greenhouse gases was flawed. The IPCC's forecasts of global output were based on national GDP converted to dollars using market exchange rates. Henderson and Ian Castles were critical of the Special Report on Emissions Scenarios (SRES) report by the Intergovernmental Panel on Climate Change (IPCC) that was published in 2000. The core of their critique was the use of market exchange rates (MER) for international comparison, in lieu of the theoretically favoured PPP exchange rate which corrects for differences in purchasing power. The IPCC rebutted this criticism. Castles and Henderson later acknowledged that they were mistaken that future greenhouse gas emissions had been significantly overestimated.

Henderson has suggested about climate change that the science is not settled, and he specifically criticized the Stern Review regarding the economics of global warming. Relatedly, in 2008, Nigel Lawson published the book An Appeal to Reason: A Cool Look at Global Warming; the dedication for the book says "To David Henderson, who first aroused my interest in all this". The following year, Lawson went on to found The Global Warming Policy Foundation, a climate change denialist think-tank, whose Academic Advisory Council Henderson went on to chair.

He was educated at Ellesmere College, Shropshire.

He died on 30 September 2018 at the age of 91.

== Books (selected) ==
- Henderson, David (2001). The Changing Fortunes of Economic Liberalism (IEA).
- Henderson, David (2001). Misguided Virtue: False Notions of Corporate Social Responsibility (IEA).
- Henderson, David (2001). Anti-Liberalism 2000 (IEA).
- Henderson, David (2004). The Role of Business in the Modern World (IEA). [Gli Affari Sono Affari, Italian translation published in Milan: Istituto Bruno Leoni, 2009.] (Page 8 contains much of the above-quoted bibliographic information.)
