= Tingwen Huang =

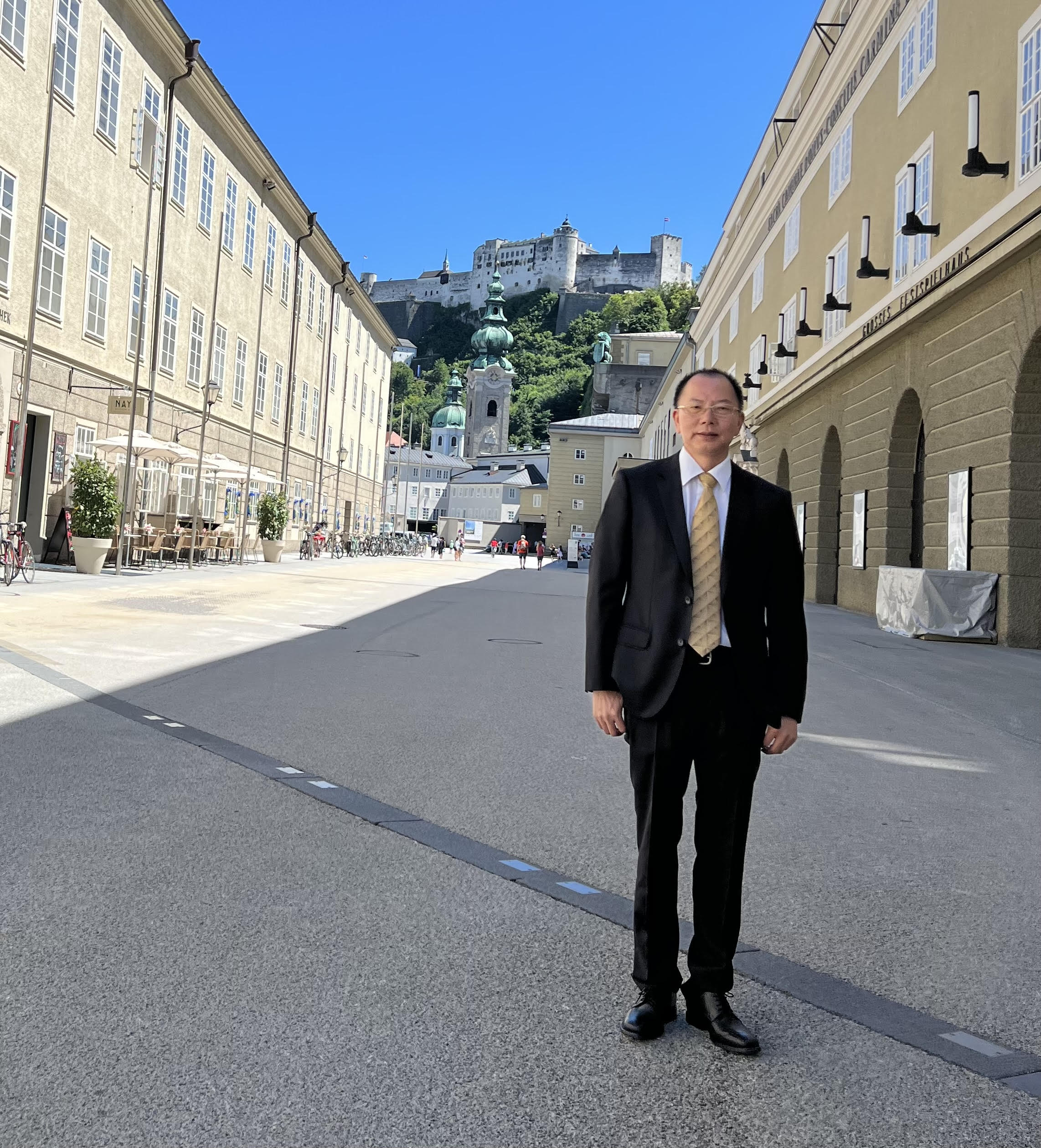
- Huang attending the Inauguration ceremony for new members of European Academy of Sciences and Arts in Salzburg 2022
- Education: Southwest University (B.S.); Sichuan University (M.S.); Texas A&M University (Ph.D.)
- Scientific career
- Fields: Computational Intelligence; Control and Optimization; Dynamics of Nonlinear Systems; Smart Grid
- Institutions: Texas A&M University at Qatar

Tingwen Huang, a Fellow of The World Academy of Sciences (TWAS) and a Member of the European Academy of Sciences and Arts.

He received his B.S. degree in Mathematics from Southwest University, China, in 1990, an M.S. degree in Mathematics from Sichuan University in 1993, and his Doctoral degree in Applied Mathematics at Texas A&M University in 2002.

Huang's main research areas are dynamics of nonlinear systems, neuromorphic computing, neural networks, computational intelligence, intelligent control, multi-agent systems, optimization and smart grids. His research papers were cited for more than 37,000 times as of January 2024 according to Google Scholar. He was named a Highly Cited Researcher in 2018, 2019 and 2020 by Clarivate's (formerly Thomson Reuters) Web of Science.

He received the Best Research Project Award from Qatar National Research Fund, and Faculty Research Excellence Award from Texas A&M University at Qatar, Qatar in 2015.

Huang was elected as an IEEE Fellow in 2018 for his contributions to dynamics of neural networks, and awarded Changjiang Scholar (Chair Professor), the highest honor conferred by Ministry of Education of China in 2019.

In 2021, he received the Outstanding Achievement Award from Asia Pacific Neural Networks Society, was elected as a Distinguished Lecturer of IEEE Computational Intelligence Society (2022-2024), an Academician of the International Academy for Systems and Cybernetic Sciences (IASCYS), a Fellow of Asia-Pacific Artificial Intelligence Association (AAIA), and a Member of the European Academy of Sciences and Arts.

In 2022, Huang was elected as a Fellow of the International Association for Pattern Recognition (IAPR). He was conferred Dean’s Achievement Award by Texas A&M University at Qatar, and The Association of Former Students Distinguished Achievement Award for Research, one of the highest honors the university can bestow upon a faculty member by Texas A&M University in College Station, Texas, USA. He was elected as a Fellow of The World Academy of Sciences (TWAS),
