= Special Report on Emissions Scenarios =

2000 report by the Intergovernmental Panel on Climate Change

The Special Report on Emissions Scenarios (SRES) is a report by the Intergovernmental Panel on Climate Change (IPCC) that was published in 2000. The greenhouse gas emissions scenarios described in the Report have been used to make projections of possible future climate change. The SRES scenarios, as they are often called, were used in the IPCC Third Assessment Report (TAR), published in 2001, and in the IPCC Fourth Assessment Report (AR4), published in 2007. The SRES scenarios were designed to improve upon some aspects of the IS92 scenarios, which had been used in the earlier IPCC Second Assessment Report of 1995. The SRES scenarios are "baseline" (or "reference") scenarios, which means that they do not take into account any current or future measures to limit greenhouse gas (GHG) emissions (e.g., the Kyoto Protocol to the United Nations Framework Convention on Climate Change).

Emissions projections of the SRES scenarios are broadly comparable in range to the baseline emissions scenarios that have been developed by the scientific community. The SRES scenarios, however, do not encompass the full range of possible futures: emissions may change less than the scenarios imply, or they could change more.

SRES was superseded by Representative Concentration Pathways (RCPs) in the IPCC fifth assessment report in 2014.

There have been a number of comments on the SRES. It has been called "a substantial advance from prior scenarios". At the same time, there have been criticisms of the SRES. The most prominently publicized criticism of SRES focused on the fact that all but one of the participating models compared gross domestic product (GDP) across regions using market exchange rates (MER), instead of the more correct purchasing-power parity (PPP) approach.

== Purpose ==
The four SRES scenario families of the Fourth Assessment Report vs. projected global average surface warming until 2100
AR4 (Summary; PDF)	More economic focus	More environmental focus
Globalisation (homogeneous world)	A1 rapid economic growth (groups: A1T; A1B; A1Fl); 1.4 − 6.4 °C	B1 global environmental sustainability 1.1 − 2.9 °C
Regionalisation (heterogeneous world)	A2 regionally oriented economic development 2.0 − 5.4 °C	B2 local environmental sustainability 1.4 − 3.8 °C

Because projections of climate change depend heavily upon future human activity, climate models are run against scenarios. There are 40 different scenarios, each making different assumptions for future greenhouse gas pollution, land-use and other driving forces. Assumptions about future technological development as well as the future economic development are thus made for each scenario. Most include an increase in the consumption of fossil fuels; some versions of B1 have lower levels of consumption by 2100 than in 1990. Overall global GDP will grow by a factor of between 5–25 in the emissions scenarios.

These emissions scenarios are organized into families, which contain scenarios that are similar to each other in some respects. IPCC assessment report projections for the future are often made in the context of a specific scenario family.

According to the IPCC, all SRES scenarios are considered "neutral". None of the SRES scenarios project future disasters or catastrophes, e.g., wars and conflicts, and/or environmental collapse.

The scenarios are not described by the IPCC as representing good or bad pathways of future social and economic development.

== Scenario families ==
Scenario families contain individual scenarios with common themes. The six families of scenarios discussed in the IPCC's Third Assessment Report (TAR) and Fourth Assessment Report (AR4) are A1FI, A1B, A1T, A2, B1, and B2.

The IPCC did not state that any of the SRES scenarios were more likely to occur than others, therefore none of the SRES scenarios represent a "best guess" of future emissions.

Scenario descriptions are based on those in AR4, which are identical to those in TAR.

=== A1 ===
The A1 scenarios are of a more integrated world. The A1 family of scenarios is characterized by:

- Rapid economic growth.
- A global population that reaches 9 billion in 2050 and then gradually declines.
- The quick spread of new and efficient technologies.
- A convergent world - income and way of life converge between regions. Extensive social and cultural interactions worldwide.

There are subsets to the A1 family based on their technological emphasis:

- A1FI - An emphasis on fossil-fuels (Fossil Intensive).
- A1B - A balanced emphasis on all energy sources.
- A1T - Emphasis on non-fossil energy sources.....

=== A2 ===
The A2 scenarios are of a more divided world. The A2 family of scenarios is characterized by:

- A world of independently operating, self-reliant nations.
- Continuously increasing population.
- Regionally oriented economic development.
- High emissions

=== B1 ===
The B1 scenarios are of a world more integrated, and more ecologically friendly. The B1 scenarios are characterized by:

- Rapid economic growth as in A1, but with rapid changes towards a service and information economy.
- Population rising to 9 billion in 2050 and then declining as in A1.
- Reductions in material intensity and the introduction of clean and resource efficient technologies.
- An emphasis on global solutions to economic, social and environmental stability.

=== B2 ===
The B2 scenarios are of a world more divided, but more ecologically friendly. The B2 scenarios are characterized by:

- Continuously increasing population, but at a slower rate than in A2.
- Emphasis on local rather than global solutions to economic, social and environmental stability.
- Intermediate levels of economic development.
- Less rapid and more fragmented technological change than in A1 and B1.

== SRES scenarios and climate change initiatives ==
While some scenarios assume a more environmentally friendly world than others, none include any climate-specific initiatives, such as the Kyoto Protocol.

== Atmospheric GHG concentrations ==
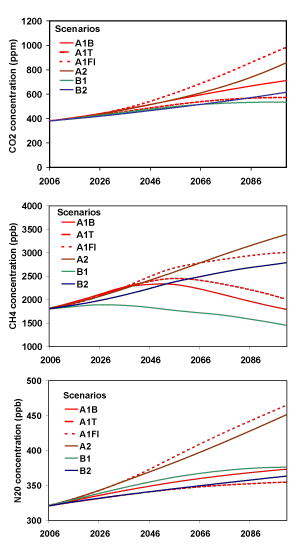
Projected changes over the 21st century in the atmospheric concentrations of three greenhouse gases: carbon dioxide (chemical formula: CO_{2}), methane (CH_{4}), and nitrous oxide (N_{2}O). These projections by the United States Environmental Protection Agency are based on emissions scenarios contained in the SRES.

The SRES scenarios have been used to project future atmospheric GHG concentrations. Under the six illustrative SRES scenarios, the IPCC Third Assessment Report (2001) projects the atmospheric concentration of carbon dioxide (CO_{2}) in the year 2100 as between 540 and 970 parts per million (ppm). In this estimate, there are uncertainties over the future removal of carbon from the atmosphere by carbon sinks. There are also uncertainties regarding future changes in the Earth's biosphere and feedbacks in the climate system. The estimated effect of these uncertainties mean that the total projected concentration ranges from 490 to 1,260 ppm. This compares to a pre-industrial (taken as the year 1750) concentration of about 280 ppm, and a concentration of about 368 ppm in the year 2000.

The United States Environmental Protection Agency has also produced projections of future atmospheric GHG concentrations using the SRES scenarios. These projections are shown opposite, and are subject to the uncertainty described earlier regarding the future role of carbon sinks and changes to the Earth's biosphere.

== Observed emissions rates ==
Between the 1990s and 2000s, the growth rate in CO_{2} emissions from fossil fuel burning and industrial processes increased (McMullen and Jabbour, 2009, p. 8). The growth rate from 1990 to 1999 averaged 1.1% per year.

Between the years 2000–2009, growth in CO_{2} emissions from fossil fuel burning was, on average, 3% per year, which exceeds the growth estimated by 35 of the 40 SRES scenarios (34 if the trend is computed with end points instead of a linear fit). Human-caused greenhouse gas emissions set a record in 2010, a 6% jump on 2009 emissions, exceeding even the "worst case" scenario cited in the IPCC Fourth Assessment Report.

== Views and analysis ==
=== MER and PPP ===
The SRES scenarios were criticised by Ian Castles and David Henderson. The core of their critique was the use of market exchange rates (MER) for international comparison, in lieu of the theoretically favoured PPP exchange rate which corrects for differences in purchasing power. The IPCC rebutted this criticism.

The positions in the debate can be summarised as follows. Using MER, the SRES scenarios overstate income differences in past and present, and overestimate future economic growth in developing countries. This, Castles and Henderson originally argued, leads to an overestimate of future greenhouse gas emissions. The IPCC future climate change projections would have been overestimated.

However, the difference in economic growth is offset by a difference in energy intensity. Some say these two opposite effects fully cancel, some say this is only partial. Overall, the effect of a switch from MER to PPP is likely to have a minimal effect on carbon dioxide concentrations in the atmosphere. Castles and Henderson later accepted this and acknowledged that they were mistaken that future greenhouse gas emissions had been significantly overestimated.

But even though global climate change is not affected, it has been argued that the regional distribution of emissions and incomes is very different between an MER and a PPP scenario. This would influence the political debate: in a PPP scenario, China and India have a much smaller share of global emissions. It would also affect vulnerability to climate change: in a PPP scenario, poor countries grow more slowly and would face greater impacts.

=== Availability of fossil fuels ===
As part of the SRES, IPCC authors assessed the potential future availability of fossil fuels for energy use. SRES assumptions about availability of fossil fuels is largely based on a 1997 study done by Rogner, who goes to great lengths to claim that there are enough fossil resources, i.e. hydrocarbon molecules in the crust, to theoretically sustain production for an extended period of time.

The issue of whether or not the future availability of fossil fuels would limit future carbon emissions was considered in the Third Assessment Report; it concluded that limits on fossil fuel resources would not limit carbon emissions in the 21st century. Their estimate for conventional coal reserves was around 1,000 gigatonnes of carbon (GtC), with an upper estimate of between 3,500 and 4,000 GtC. This compares with cumulative carbon emissions up to the year 2100 of about 1,000 GtC for the SRES B1 scenario, and about 2,000 GtC for the SRES A1FI scenario.

The carbon in proven conventional oil and gas reserves was estimated to be much less than the cumulative carbon emissions associated with atmospheric stabilization of CO_{2} concentrations at levels of 450 ppmv or higher. The Third Assessment Report suggested that the future makeup of the world's energy mix would determine whether or not greenhouse gas concentrations were stabilized in the 21st century. The future energy mix might be based more on the exploitation of unconventional oil and gas (e.g., oil sands, shale oil, tight oil, shale gas), or more on the use of non-fossil energy sources, like renewable energy. Total primary energy production from fossil fuels in the SRES outlooks range from a mere 50% increase from year 2010 in the B1 family to over 400% in the A1 family.

==== Criticism ====
Direct quote from abstract of Wang et al.:

Climate projections are based on emission scenarios. The emission scenarios used by the IPCC and by mainstream climate scientists are largely derived from the predicted demand for fossil fuels, and in our view take insufficient consideration of the constrained emissions that are likely due to the depletion of these fuels.

This persistent problem has been criticized for a long time as many assumptions used for fossil fuel availability and future production have been optimistic at best and implausible at worst. The SRES and RCP scenarios have been criticized for being biased towards "exaggerated resource availability" and making "unrealistic expectations on future production outputs from fossil fuels. Energy cannot be seen as a limitless input to economic/climate models and remain disconnected from the physical and logistical realities of supply.

A recent meta-analysis of the fossil energy outlooks used for climate change scenarios even identified a "return to coal hypothesis", as most mainstream climate scenarios foresee a significant increase in world coal production in the future. Patzek and Croft (2010, p. 3113) made a prediction of future coal production and carbon emissions. In their assessment, all but the lowest emission SRES scenarios projected far too high levels of future coal production and carbon emissions (Patzek and Croft, 2010, pp. 3113–3114). Similar results was reached by other long-term coal projections

In a discussion paper, Aleklett (2007, p. 17) viewed SRES projections between the years 2020 and 2100 as "absolutely unrealistic". In Aleklett's analysis, emissions from oil and gas were lower than all of the SRES projections, with emissions from coal much lower than the majority of SRES projections (Aleklett, 2007, p. 2).

=== Select Committee report ===
In 2005, the UK Parliament's House of Lords Economics Affairs Select Committee produced a report on the economics of climate change. As part of their inquiry, they took evidence on criticisms of the SRES. Among those who gave evidence to the committee were Dr Ian Castles, a critic of the SRES scenarios, and Prof Nebojsa Nakicenovic, who co-edited the SRES. IPCC author Dr Chris Hope commented on the SRES A2 scenario, which is one of the higher emissions scenarios of the SRES. Hope assessed and compared the marginal damages of climate change using two versions of the A2 scenario. In one version of the A2 scenario, emissions were as the IPCC projected. In the other version of A2, Hope reduced the IPCC's projected emissions by a half (i.e., 50% of the original A2 scenario). In his integrated assessment model, both of these versions of the A2 scenario lead to almost identical estimates of marginal climate damages (the present-day value of emitting one tonne of CO_{2} into the atmosphere). Based on this finding, Hope argued that present day climate policy was insensitive to whether or not you accepted the validity of the higher emission SRES scenarios.

IPCC author Prof Richard Tol commented on the strengths and weaknesses of the SRES scenarios. In his view, the A2 SRES marker scenario was, by far, the most realistic. UK Government departments Defra and HM Treasury argued that case for action on climate change was not undermined by the Castles and Henderson critique of the SRES scenarios. They also commented that unless effective action was taken to curb emissions growth, other bodies, like the International Energy Agency, expected greenhouse gas emissions to continue to rise into the future.

=== Comparison with a "no policy" scenario ===
In a report published by the MIT Joint Program on the Science and Policy of Global Change, Webster et al. (2008) compared the SRES scenarios with their own "no policy" scenario. Their no-policy scenario assumes that in the future, the world does nothing to limit greenhouse gas emissions. They found that most of the SRES scenarios were outside of the 90% probability range of their no-policy scenario (Webster et al., 2008, p. 1). Most of the SRES scenarios were consistent with efforts to stabilize greenhouse gas concentrations in the atmosphere. Webster et al. (2008, p. 54) noted that the SRES scenarios were designed to cover most of the range of future emission levels in the published scientific literature. Many such scenarios in the literature presumably assumed that future efforts would be made to stabilize greenhouse gas concentrations.

== Post-SRES projections ==
As part of the IPCC Fourth Assessment Report, the literature on emissions scenarios was assessed. Baseline emissions scenarios published since the SRES were found to be comparable in range to those in the SRES. IPCC (2007) noted that post-SRES scenarios had used lower values for some drivers for emissions, notably population projections. However, of the assessed studies that had incorporated new population projections, changes in other drivers, such as economic growth, resulted in little change in overall emission levels.

== Succession ==
In IPCC Fifth Assessment Report released in 2014, SRES projections were superseded by Representative Concentration Pathways (RCPs) models.

== See also ==
- SRES scenarios on IPCC Server as Excel Spreadsheet
- General circulation model

== Sources ==
- IPCC TAR WG3 (2001), Metz, B.; Davidson, O.; Swart, R.; Pan, J. (eds.), Climate Change 2001: Mitigation, Contribution of Working Group III to the Third Assessment Report of the Intergovernmental Panel on Climate Change, Cambridge University Press, ISBN 0-521-80769-7 (pb: 0-521-01502-2).
- IPCC TAR SYR (2001), Watson, R. T.; the Core Writing Team (eds.), Climate Change 2001: Synthesis Report, Contribution of Working Groups I, II, and III to the Third Assessment Report of the Intergovernmental Panel on Climate Change, Cambridge University Press, ISBN 0 521 80770 0 (pb: 0-521-01507-3).
- IPCC AR4 WG1 (2007), Solomon, S.; Qin, D.; Manning, M.; Chen, Z.; Marquis, M.; Averyt, K.B.; Tignor, M.; Miller, H.L. (eds.), Climate Change 2007: The Physical Science Basis, Contribution of Working Group I to the Fourth Assessment Report of the Intergovernmental Panel on Climate Change, Cambridge University Press, ISBN 978-0-521-88009-1 (pb: 978-0-521-70596-7).
- IPCC AR4 WG2 (2007), Parry, M.L.; Canziani, O.F.; Palutikof, J.P.; van der Linden, P.J.; Hanson, C.E. (eds.), Climate Change 2007: Impacts, Adaptation and Vulnerability, Contribution of Working Group II to the Fourth Assessment Report of the Intergovernmental Panel on Climate Change, Cambridge University Press, ISBN 978-0-521-88010-7 (pb: 978-0-521-70597-4).
- IPCC AR4 WG3 (2007), Metz, B.; Davidson, O.R.; Bosch, P.R.; Dave, R.; Meyer, L.A. (eds.), Climate Change 2007: Mitigation of Climate Change, Contribution of Working Group III to the Fourth Assessment Report of the Intergovernmental Panel on Climate Change, Cambridge University Press, ISBN 978-0-521-88011-4 (pb: 978-0-521-70598-1).
- IPCC AR4 SYR (2007), Pachauri, R. K.; Reisinger, A.; et al. (eds.), Climate Change 2007: Synthesis Report, Contribution of Working Groups I, II and III to the Fourth Assessment Report of the Intergovernmental Panel on Climate Change, IPCC, ISBN 92-9169-122-4.
- IPCC SRES (2000), Nakićenović, N.; Swart, R. (eds.), Special Report on Emissions Scenarios: A special report of Working Group III of the Intergovernmental Panel on Climate Change (book), Cambridge University Press, ISBN 0-521-80081-1, 978-052180081-5 (pb: 0-521-80493-0, 978-052180493-6).
- IPCC SRES SPM (2000), "Summary for Policymakers" (PDF), Emissions Scenarios: A Special Report of IPCC Working Group III (PDF), IPCC, ISBN 92-9169-113-5.
- SRES data (2000), SRES Final Data (version 1.1, July 2000), Center for International Earth Science Information Network.
- Parson, E.; et al. (July 2007), Global Change Scenarios: Their Development and Use. Sub-report 2.1B of Synthesis and Assessment Product 2.1 by the U.S. Climate Change Science Program and the Subcommittee on Global Change Research, Washington, DC: Department of Energy, Office of Biological & Environmental Research, archived from the original on 30 June 2013
