= Gu Jifa =

Chinese systems scientist

Gu Jifa (Chinese: 顾基发; born 1930s) is a Chinese systems scientist, and Professor of Operations Research and Systems Engineering at the Institute of Systems Science, Academy of Mathematics and System Sciences, Chinese Academy of Sciences. He is known for hs proposal of the "oriental Wu-li Shi-li Ren-li system approach." He is an academician of the International Academy for Systems and Cybernetic Sciences.

== Biography ==
Gu was born in Shanghai, with his ancestral home in Zhenhai, Zhejiang. He studied at Fudan University from 1953 to 1956, before earning his BA in computational mathematics from Peking University in 1957. He obtained his Ph.D. from the USSR Academy of Sciences with a major in operations research in 1963.

In 1957 Gu had started his academic career at Chinese Academy of Sciences at its Institute of Mechanics, Institute of Mathematics, later renamed to Institute of Systems Science. He taught and did research in the fields of operations research, multiple criteria decision analysis, evaluation, and systems engineering. From 1999 to 2003 he was Professor at Japan Advanced Institute of Science and Technology in its Lab of Socio-Technical Systems of the School of Knowledge Science. Upon his return he proceeded as Professor of Management school of Graduate School, Chinese Academy of Sciences, and as professor of Management School of Dalian University of Technology.

Gu served as the president of Systems Engineering Society of China from 1994 to 2002; and president of International Federation for Systems Research 2002-2005. He also served as honorary editor of the journal Systems Research and Behavioral Science and is currently Vice President of the International Academy for Systems and Cybernetic Sciences.

== Selected publications ==
Gu has published 200 papers and more than 30 books and proceedings. A selection:

- Jifa Gu. Multiple Criteria Decision Making 1995.
- Jifa Gu, Gerald Midgley and David Campbell. Dealing with Human Relations in Chinese System Practice. 2000.
- Jifa Gu, Guozhi Xu and Hongan Che. A Study on System Science and Engineering.. Shanghai: Shanghai Science and Technology Education Press, 2000.
- Jifa Gu & Gerhard Chroust (eds.). IFSR 2005 - The New Roles of Systems Sciences for a Knowledge-based Society, Kobe 2005. Jaist Press, Komatsu, Japan. 2005
- Jifa Gu, Yoshiteru Nakamori, Zhongtuo Wang and Xijin Tang. Towards knowledge synthesis and creation, 2006.

Articles, a selection

- Jifa Gu & Xijin Tang. "Meta-synthesis approach to complex system modeling". In: European Journal of Operational Research 166(3): 2005; 597-614.
- Jifa Gu, Yijun Liu and Wenyuan Niu. "Exploring Computational Scheme of Complex Problem Solving Based on Meta-Synthesis Approach". In: International Conference on Computational Science (4) 2007: 9-17
- Jifa Gu & Andrzej P. Wierzbicki. "Debating and Creativity Support". In: Creative Environments 2007: 127-154
