= Nebojsa Nakicenovic =

Nebojsa Nakicenovic (also Nebojša Nakićenović) (born 1949, Belgrade, (former) Yugoslavia) is an energy economist.

== Biography ==
He is Former Deputy Director General/ Deputy CEO of the International Institute for Applied System Analysis (IIASA) in Laxenburg, Austria and former Full Professor of Energy Economics at the Vienna University of Technology, Austria. He is originally from Montenegro and is now citizen of Austria.

He holds a bachelor's degree (B.A.) in Economics, from Princeton University, Princeton, NJ, United States, Masters (M.A.) and Doctorate Degree (Ph.D) in Economics and Computer Science from the University of Vienna, Austria, and a Doctorate Degree (Ph.D.) Honoris Causa in Engineering Sciences, from the Russian Academy of Sciences, Moscow, Russia. In 2018, Nakicenovic was inducted into the International Academy for Systems and Cybernetic Sciences.

Nakicenovic contributed to a 1981 classic on sustainable energy policies.

Nebojsa Nakicenovic has been involved in all Assessment Reports of the Intergovernmental Panel on Climate Change (IPCC). In 2000, he published, together with Robert Swart, the Special Report on Emissions Scenarios. He was the Director of the Global Energy Assessment (GEA), which was published in 2012. He was Member of the Steering Committee of the Austrian Assessment Report On Climate Change 2014, which was published in September 2014.

He is a Member of several (international) scientific advisory boards and initiatives, amongst others, the German Advisory Council on Global Change, Earth League, the Steering Committee of Renewable Energy Policy Network for the 21st Century (REN21), the Global Carbon Project, the UN Secretary-General's High-Level Group on Sustainable Energy For All, and the Climate Change Centre Austria.

Between 2020 and 2025, Nakicenovic served as a Chief Scientific Advisor to the European Commission.

== Editorial Membership ==
- Journal on Technological Forecasting and Social Change
- Climate Policy
- Energy Policy
- Current Opinion in Environmental Sustainability
- Ecosystem Health and Sustainability
- The Scientific World Journal
- Environmental Innovation and Societal Transitions
- Journal of Energy Strategy Reviews
