= Ji-Feng Zhang =

Ji-Feng Zhang (born 1963) was born in Shandong, China. He is currently the vice-chair of the technical board of the International Federation of Automatic Control (IFAC), the vice-president of the Systems Engineering Society of China (SESC), the vice-president of the Chinese Association of Automation (CAA), the chair of the technical committee on Control Theory (CAA), and the editor-in-chief for both All About Systems and Control and the Journal of Systems Science and Mathematical Sciences.

== Biography ==
Ji-Feng Zhang was born in September 1963, Shandong, China. He received the B.S. degree in mathematics, from Shandong University in 1985, and M.S. and Ph.D. in control theory and stochastic systems, from Institute of Systems Science (ISS), Chinese Academy of Sciences (CAS) in 1988 and 1991, respectively. From November 1991 to December 1992, he was a postdoctoral fellow was with McGill University, Canada. From December 1996 to February 1998, he was with the Chinese University of Hong Kong. Since 1985 he has been with the ISS, CAS, where he is now a Guan Zhapzhi Chair Professor of the Academy of Mathematics and System Sciences (AMSS), and the director of the ISS.

== Contributions to the field ==
=== Job history ===
Zhang has served as a vice-chair of the technical board of IFAC (2014–present), convener of Systems Science Discipline, Academic Degree Committee of the State Council, China (2009–present), vice-president of the Systems Engineering Society of China (2010–present), vice- president of the Chinese Association of Automation (CAA, 2014–present), chair of the Technical Committee on Control Theory (TCCT), CAA (2010–present), standing member of the Chinese Mathematical Society (2008–2015), vice-president of the Beijing Mathematical Society, China (2006–2013), member of the board of governors, IEEE Control Systems Society (2013), member of the steering committee, Asian Control Association, (2009–2014), vice-general secretary of CAA (2002–2008), vice-chair of TCCT, CAA (2002–2007), general secretary of TCCT, CAA (1993–2002), senior member of IEEE (1997–2013), member of the IFAC Technical Committee on Modeling, identification and Signal Processing (2009–present).

He also has been a general co-chair of the 32nd and 33rd Chinese Control Conference (2013, 2014), program chair/co-chair of the 17th IFAC Symposium on System Identification (2015), the 30th Chinese Control Conference (2011), the 9th World Congress on Intelligent Control and Automation, Beijing, China (2012), the IEEE International Conference on Control Applications, part of the IEEE Multi-Conference on Systems and Control (2012), vice-chair of the 20th IFAC World Congress (2017), and an organizing committee co-chair of the 21st-26th Chinese Control Conferences (2002–2007), the 1st-4th Chinese-Swedish Conference on Control (2003–2008), the 1st-8th Conference on Frontier Problems in Systems and Control (2000–2008), and a finance co-chair of the 48th Conference on Decision and Control (2009).

He is/was the founding editor-in-chief of All About Systems and Control (2014–present), editor-in-chief of the Journal of Systems Science and Mathematical Sciences (2014–present), managing editor of Journal of Systems Science and Complexity (2007–2014), deputy editor-in-chief of the following journals: Science China: Information Sciences (2014–present), Scientia Sinica: Informationis (2014–present), Journal of Systems Science and Mathematical Sciences (2004–2013), Acta Automatica Sinica (2005–2010), Control Theory and Applications (2008–2013), Systems Engineering: Theory and Practice (2011–present); and associate editor or an editorial board member of the following journals: IEEE Transactions on Automatic Control (2007–2009), SIAM Journal on Control and Optimization (2008–2013), Aerospace Control and Application (2008–present), Mathematics in Practice and Theory (2006–2013), Acta Automatica Sinica (1999–2010), Control Theory and Applications (2003–2008), Journal of Control Theory and Applications (2003–2008), and the Journal of Shandong University (Engineering Science) (2011–2015).

=== Research areas ===
Zhang’s current research interests are system identification, adaptive control, stochastic systems, and multi-agent systems.

==== System identification ====
He made original contributions on system identification, including the estimation of the orders, time-delays and parameters of stochastic systems. He gave a criterion for time-delay estimate, with which one can get a strong consistent time-delay estimate. He with co-authors initiated the research on the parameter identification and adaptive control of the systems with quantized observations, and investigated the optimal adaptive control and identification errors, time complexity, optimal input design, and impact of disturbances and unmodeled dynamics on identification accuracy and complexity in both stochastic and deterministic frameworks. With a series of significant results, he has established a solid framework for the identification and adaptive control of uncertainty systems with quantized information. This is of great importance for many practical systems, especially, when digital communications are needed.

==== Adaptive control ====
He investigated the capability issues of robust and adaptive control in dealing with uncertainty, and revealed that to capture the intrinsic limitations of adaptive control, it is necessary to use sup-types of transient and persistent performance, rather than limsup-types which reflect only asymptotic behavior of a system. This indicates that intimate interaction and inherent conflict between identification and control result in a certain performance lower bound which does not approach the nominal performance even when the system varies very slowly. For nonlinear hybrid stochastic systems with unknown jump-Markov parameters, he with co-authors used the Wonham nonlinear filter to estimate the unknown parameters and presented an estimation error bound, which is a basic tool and plays an important role in performance analysis of adaptive control of nonlinear hybrid stochastic systems. He also attacked a series of hard problems related on global output-feedback control of nonlinear stochastic systems with inverse dynamics, including practical output-feedback risk-sensitive control, robust adaptive stabilization, small-gain theorem of general nonlinear stochastic systems. Different from the existing literature, the systems considered in his work are so complicated that renders any control design for them is much difficult. He developed a set of predominant methods and obtained many innovative results. The work represents an accomplishment for both the field of stochastic nonlinear stabilization and the backstepping method.

==== Stochastic multi-agent systems ====
In control of stochastic multi-agent systems, Zhang thoroughly studied the interaction of interest coupled decision-makers and the uncertainty of individual behavior, which is the prominent characteristic of multi-agent systems (MASs). He made a systematic study of the sample path behavior of the closed-loop system in relation to Nash Equilibria (NE) and a substantial contribution to the developing theory of Nash Certainty Equivalence (NCE) for large population stochastic dynamic games. He introduced the concepts of asymptotic Nash- equilibrium in probability and almost surely, and elucidated the relationship between these concepts, which provides necessary tools for analyzing the optimality of the decentralized control laws. With respect to the decentralized quadratic-type and tracking-type performance indices, by using Nash Certainty Equivalence he developed decentralized optimal controls, and proved the optimality of the closed-loop systems. He also initiated the study on consensusability and formability of MAS and obtained necessary and sufficient conditions which reflect the intrinsic relationships between the consensusability/formability and the agents’ dynamics, admissible control sets and communication topologies. These works are of great significance, since they break through the framework of conventional control theory and extend the methodology and tools in the stochastic adaptive control theory to analyzing MAS.

==== Index-coupled example ====
The multi-agent system Zhang mentioned could be used to describe an engineering or economic system. The uncertainty in his work is a kind of random noise appearing in the agent’s dynamic model. Brownian agent swarm systems are such examples, where the acceleration of agent depends on not only its own state variables (e.g. position, velocity, and energy), control, Gaussian white noise, but also the population position average. The dynamic equations are coupled together via the population position average. Other interest or performance index-coupled examples can be found in wireless communication networks and stock markets. In a wireless communication network with users, the changing rate of the received power for user depends on, its neighbors’ powers, control, random noise. Each user makes its own power control strategy to ensure the signal-to- interference-ratio to approach a desired level. This can be formulated by the following model (for simplicity, here we use a linear model with constant parameters) and a coupled-index group: where is the neighbor of user, are system parameters, is the constant background noise intensity, and. In a stock market with investigators, suppose that profits of each investigator is influenced by his recent profits situation and the profits situation of his neighbors, and each investigator wants to get something around the average value. Then, the problem can be described by the following model (for simplicity, here we use a linear model with constant parameters) and a coupled-interest index group: When a=1 and b=0, the coupled-interest index becomes.

== Publications and awards ==
Zhang was elected as a Fellow of the Institute of Electrical and Electronics Engineers (IEEE) and as a Fellow of the International Federation of Automatic Control (IFAC). He was the second-place winner of the State Natural Science Award (China) in both 2010 and 2015. Zhang has also received the Distinguished Young Scholar Fund from National Natural Science Foundation of China in 1997; the First Prize of the Young Scientist Award of CAS in 1995; Excellent Chinese Doctoral Dissertation Supervisor in 2009; Excellent Graduate Student Supervisor of Chinese Academy of Sciences (CAS) in 2007, 2008 and 2009; the Best Paper award of the 7th Asian Control Conference in 2009; and the Guan Zhaozhi Best Paper award of the 23rd Chinese Control Conference in 2004.

Zhang’s current research interests are system identification, adaptive control, stochastic systems, and multi-agent systems. He has published 2 books, over 110 journal papers and 70 conference papers, in journals such as IEEE Transactions on Automatic Control, Automatica, and SIAM Journal on Control and Optimization. He has 5 papers listed in "Highly Cited Papers" by the ISI Web of Knowledge, Essential Science Indicators from Aug 2007 to Aug 2015.

=== Recent publications ===
==== Books ====
- L.Y. Wang, G. Yin, J.F. Zhang and Y. L. Zhao, System Identification with Quantized Observations, Birkhauser, Boston, 2010.
- Qiang Zhang and Ji-Feng Zhang, Distributed Estimation and Control of Multi-Agent Systems, Science Press, Beijing, 2015. (In Chinese)
