= Huaguang Zhang =

Chinese engineer

Huaguang Zhang is an engineer at Northeastern University China in Shenyang, China. He was named a Fellow of the Institute of Electrical and Electronics Engineers (IEEE) in 2015 for his contributions to stability analysis of recurrent neural networks and intelligent control of nonlinear systems.
