= IPCC Third Assessment Report =

2001 United Nations climate change assessment

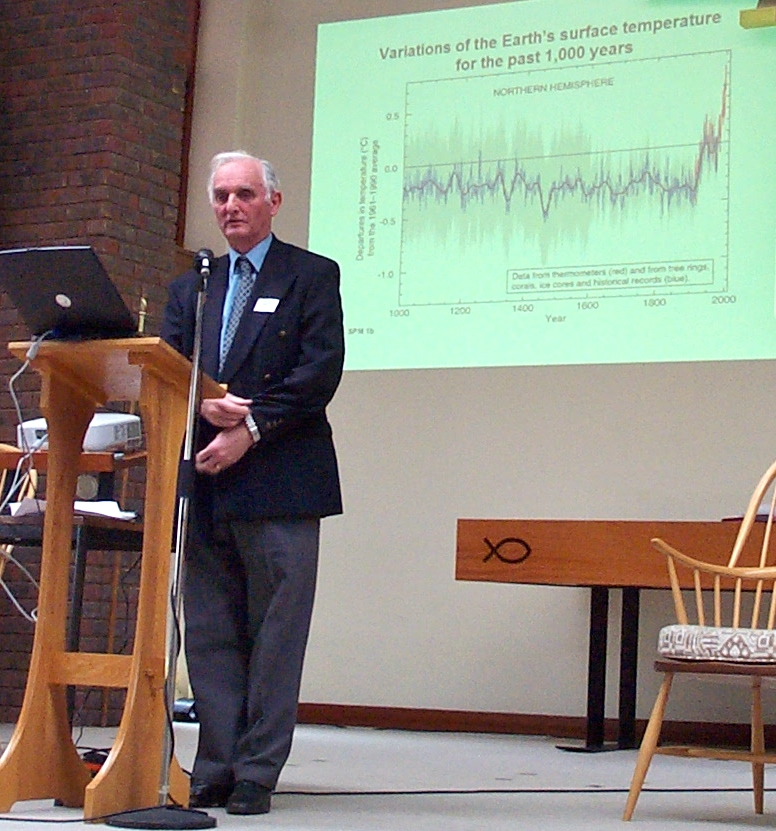
IPCC WG1 co-chair Sir John T. Houghton showing the IPCC fig. 2.20 hockey stick graph at a climate conference in 2005

The IPCC Third Assessment Report (TAR), Climate Change 2001, is an assessment of available scientific and socio-economic information on climate change by the IPCC. Statements of the IPCC or information from the TAR were often used as a reference showing a scientific consensus on the subject of global warming. The Third Assessment Report (TAR) was completed in 2001 and consists of four reports, three of them from its Working Groups: Working Group I: The Scientific Basis; Working Group II: Impacts, Adaptation and Vulnerability; Working Group III: Mitigation; Synthesis Report. A number of the TAR's conclusions are given quantitative estimates of how probable it is that they are correct, e.g., greater than 66% probability of being correct. These are "Bayesian" probabilities, which are based on an expert assessment of all the available evidence.

"Robust findings" of the Synthesis Report include:

- "Observations show Earth's surface is warming. Globally, 1990s very likely warmest decade in instrumental record". Atmospheric concentrations of anthropogenic (i.e., human-emitted) greenhouse gases have increased substantially.
- Since the mid-20th century, most of the observed warming is "likely" (greater than 66% probability, based on expert judgement) due to human activities.
- Projections based on the Special Report on Emissions Scenarios suggest warming over the 21st century at a more rapid rate than that experienced for at least the last 10,000 years.
- "Projected climate change will have beneficial and adverse effects on both environmental and socioeconomic systems, but the larger the changes and the rate of change in climate, the more the adverse effects predominate."
- "Ecosystems and species are vulnerable to climate change and other stresses (as illustrated by observed impacts of recent regional temperature changes) and some will be irreversibly damaged or lost."
- "Greenhouse gas emission reduction (mitigation) actions would lessen the pressures on natural and human systems from climate change."
- "Adaptation [to the effects of climate change] has the potential to reduce adverse effects of climate change and can often produce immediate ancillary benefits, but will not prevent all damages." An example of adaptation to climate change is building levees in response to sea level rise.

== Working groups ==
The IPCC was established in 1988 by the United Nations Environment Programme (UNEP) and the UN's World Meteorological Organization (WMO) "... to assess scientific, technical and socio-economic information relevant for the understanding of climate change, its potential impacts and options for adaptation and mitigation." The IPCC is organized as three working groups (WG) and a task force :

- WGI: Scientific aspects of climate (see IPCC TAR WG1 2001).
- WGII: Vulnerability, consequences, and options (see IPCC TAR WG2 2001).
- WGIII: Limitation and mitigation options (see IPCC TAR WG3 2001).
- Task Force: National Greenhouse Gas Inventories Programme

WG I covers the same areas as the Second Assessment Report (SAR) of 1995, but WG II & III cover slightly different areas in the TAR.

== Conclusions ==
=== Working Group I ===
The key conclusions of Working Group I were:

1. An increasing body of observations gives a collective picture of a warming world and other changes in the climate system (The global average surface temperature has increased over the 20th century by about 0.6 °C; Temperatures have risen during the past four decades in the lowest 8 kilometres of the atmosphere; Snow cover and ice extent have decreased)
2. Emissions of greenhouse gases and aerosols due to human activities continue to alter the atmosphere in ways that are expected to affect the climate (Anthropogenic aerosols (i.e., human emitted aerosols) are short-lived and mostly produce negative radiative forcing; Natural factors have made small contributions to radiative forcing over the past century)
3. Confidence in the ability of models to project future climate has increased (Complex physically based climate models are required to provide detailed estimates of feedbacks and of regional features. Such models cannot yet simulate all aspects of climate (e.g., they still cannot account fully for the observed trend in the surface-troposphere temperature difference since 1979) and there are particular uncertainties associated with clouds and their interaction with radiation and aerosols. Nevertheless, confidence in the ability of these models to provide useful projections of future climate has improved due to their demonstrated performance on a range of space and time-scales.)
4. There is new and stronger evidence that most of the warming observed over the last 50 years is attributable to human activities
5. Human influences will continue to change atmospheric composition throughout the 21st century
6. Global average temperature and sea level are projected to rise under all IPCC SRES scenarios.

The TAR estimate for the climate sensitivity is 1.5 to 4.5 °C; and the average surface temperature is projected to increase by 1.4 to 5.8 Celsius degrees over the period 1990 to 2100, and the sea level is projected to rise by 0.1 to 0.9 metres over the same period. The wide range in projections is based upon several different scenarios that assume different levels of future CO_{2} emissions (see the section below on Projections in the TAR).

=== Synthesis Report ===
The TAR Synthesis Report includes a summary of the TAR's main findings and uncertainties. "Robust findings" of the TAR include:

- Observed warming of the Earth's surface, attribution of observed warming to human activities, projected increases in future global mean temperature, rising sea levels, and increased frequency of heat waves.
- Future warming will have both beneficial and adverse effects, but for higher levels of warming, adverse effects will predominate.
- Developing countries and poor persons are most vulnerable to climate change.

"Key uncertainties" in the TAR include:

- Estimated climate forcings of natural climatic factors and anthropogenic aerosols (e.g., sulfate, which is produced when sulfur-rich coal is burnt), future changes in greenhouse gas (GHG) emissions, and the role of climate feedbacks, which may amplify or reduce the magnitude of future climate change;
- Assigning probabilities to projections of changes in sea level and temperature, as well as uncertainties related to regional projections of climate change.

== List of greenhouse gases ==
The following tables are adapted from Chapter 6 of the Working Group 1 report.

=== Gases relevant to radiative forcing only ===
Gas	Alternate name	Formula	1998 level	Increase since 1750	Radiative forcing (Wm^{−2})	Specific heat at STP (J kg^{−1})
Carbon dioxide	Carbon Dioxide	(CO_{2})	365 μmol/mol	87 μmol/mol	1.46	0.819
Methane	Marsh gas	(CH_{4})	1,745 nmol/mol	1,045 nmol/mol	0.48	2.191
Nitrous oxide	Laughing gas	(N_{2}O)	314 nmol/mol	44 nmol/mol	0.15	0.88
Tetrafluoromethane	Carbon tetrafluoride	(CF_{4})	80 pmol/mol	40 pmol/mol	0.003	1.33
Hexafluoroethane	Perfluoroethane	(C_{2}F_{6})	3 pmol/mol	3 pmol/mol	0.001	0.067
Sulfur hexafluoride	Sulfur fluoride	(SF_{6})	4.2 pmol/mol	4.2 pmol/mol	0.002	0.074
HFC-23	Trifluoromethane	(CHF_{3})	14 pmol/mol	14 pmol/mol	0.002	0.064
HFC-134a	1,1,1,2-Tetrafluoroethane	C_{2}H_{2}F_{4}	7.5 pmol/mol	7.5 pmol/mol	0.001	0.007
HFC-152a	1,1-Difluoroethane	(C_{2}H_{4}F_{2})	0.5 pmol/mol	0.5 pmol/mol	0.000	0.04

=== Gases relevant to radiative forcing and ozone depletion ===
Gas	Alternate name	Formula	1998 level	Increase since 1750	Radiative forcing (Wm^{−2})
CFC-11§	Trichlorofluoromethane	(CFCl_{3})	268 pmol/mol	268 pmol/mol	0.07
CFC-12§	Dichlorodifluoromethane	(CF_{2}Cl_{2})	533 pmol/mol	533 pmol/mol	0.17
CFC-13§	Chlorotrifluoromethane	(CClF_{3})	4 pmol/mol	4 pmol/mol	0.001
CFC-113	1,1,1-Trichlorotrifluoroethane	(C_{2}F_{3}Cl_{3})	84 pmol/mol	84 pmol/mol	0.03
CFC-114	1,2-Dichlorotetrafluoroethane	(C_{2}F_{4}Cl_{2})	15 pmol/mol	15 pmol/mol	0.005
CFC-115	Chloropentafluoroethane	(C_{2}F_{5}Cl)	7 pmol/mol	7 pmol/mol	0.001
Carbon tetrachloride	Tetrachloromethane	(CCl_{4})	102 pmol/mol	102 pmol/mol	0.01
1,1,1-Trichloroethane	Methyl chloroform	(CH_{3}CCl_{3})	69 pmol/mol	69 pmol/mol	0.004
HCFC-141b	1,1-Dichloro-1-fluoroethane	(C_{2}H_{3}FCl_{2})	10 pmol/mol	10 pmol/mol	0.001
HCFC-142b	1-Chloro-1,1-difluoroethane	(C_{2}H_{3}F_{2}Cl)	11 pmol/mol	11 pmol/mol	0.002
Halon-1211	Bromochlorodifluoromethane	(CClF_{2}Br)	3.8 pmol/mol	3.8 pmol/mol	0.001
Halon-1301	Bromotrifluoromethane	(CF_{3}Br)	2.5 pmol/mol	2.5 pmol/mol	0.001

== Projections ==
Projections are used in the TAR as a guide to the possible future effects of climate change, e.g., changes in global mean temperature and sea level. In the TAR, the word "projection" is favoured over "prediction". This is because many future changes related to climate are highly uncertain. For example, climate change projections are affected by highly uncertain changes in future GHG emissions.

The TAR projects impacts according to possible future changes in global mean temperature. Other projections are based on scenarios that the IPCC has developed. In 2000, the IPCC published 40 different scenarios (the "SRES" scenarios) which contain estimates of future changes in anthropogenic emissions of greenhouse gases and aerosols. The SRES scenarios project a wide range of possible changes in future social and economic development, and projected climate change impacts vary according to the scenario considered. The IPCC has not assigned probabilities to the 40 SRES scenarios. Some authors have argued that some SRES scenarios are more likely to occur than others.

== Scientific opinion ==
The IPCC is backed by the scientific community. For example, a joint statement of support was issued in May 2001 by the science academies of Australia, Belgium, Brazil, Canada, the Caribbean, China, France, Germany, India, Indonesia, Ireland, Italy, Malaysia, New Zealand, Sweden and the UK. It states: "We recognise the IPCC as the world's most reliable source of information on climate change and its causes, and we endorse its method of achieving consensus."

In 2001, the executive branch of the US federal government asked the US National Research Council (US NRC, 2001) to produce an assessment of climate change science. Part of the assessment by US NRC (2001) looks at the report produced by Working Group I (WG I) in the TAR. Working Group I's contribution to the TAR assesses the physical scientific aspects of the climate system and climate change. US NRC (2001) generally agrees with findings of the WG I report, for example, US NRC (2001) state that "[the] IPCC's conclusion that most of the observed warming of the last 50 years is likely to have been due to the increase in greenhouse gas concentrations accurately reflects the current thinking of the scientific community on this issue."

US NRC (2001) emphasise the need for governments to have a good understanding of uncertainties in climate change science. The example cited by US NRC (2001) is the uncertainty over future changes in GHG emissions, which may be less or more than that projected by the TAR. US NRC (2001) also state:

The most valuable contribution U.S. scientists can make is to continually question basic assumptions and conclusions, promote clear and careful appraisal and presentation of the uncertainties about climate change as well as those areas in which science is leading to robust conclusions, and work toward a significant improvement in the ability to project the future.

== Reception ==
=== Endorsements ===
In 2001, 16 national science academies issued a joint statement on climate change.

The joint statement was made by the Australian Academy of Science, the Royal Flemish Academy of Belgium for Science and the Arts, the Brazilian Academy of Sciences, the Royal Society of Canada, the Caribbean Academy of Sciences, the Chinese Academy of Sciences, the French Academy of Sciences, the German Academy of Natural Scientists Leopoldina, the Indian National Science Academy, the Indonesian Academy of Sciences, the Royal Irish Academy, Accademia Nazionale dei Lincei (Italy), the Academy of Sciences Malaysia, the Academy Council of the Royal Society of New Zealand, the Royal Swedish Academy of Sciences, and the Royal Society (UK). The statement, also published as an editorial in the journal Science, stated "we support the [TAR's] conclusion that it is at least 90% certain that temperatures will continue to rise, with average global surface temperature projected to increase by between 1.4 and 5.8 °C above 1990 levels by 2100".

The TAR has also been endorsed by the Canadian Foundation for Climate and Atmospheric Sciences, Canadian Meteorological and Oceanographic Society, and European Geosciences Union (refer to "Endorsements of the IPCC").

In 2001, the US National Research Council (US NRC) produced a report that assessed Working Group I's (WGI) contribution to the TAR. US NRC (2001) "generally agrees" with the WGI assessment, and describes the full WGI report as an "admirable summary of research activities in climate science".

IPCC author Richard Lindzen has made a number of criticisms of the TAR. Among his criticisms, Lindzen has stated that the WGI Summary for Policymakers (SPM) does not faithfully summarize the full WGI report. For example, Lindzen states that the SPM understates the uncertainty associated with climate models. John Houghton, who was a co-chair of TAR WGI, has responded to Lindzen's criticisms of the SPM. Houghton has stressed that the SPM is agreed upon by delegates from many of the world's governments, and that any changes to the SPM must be supported by scientific evidence.

IPCC author Kevin Trenberth has also commented on the WGI SPM. Trenberth has stated that during the drafting of the WGI SPM, some government delegations attempted to "blunt, and perhaps obfuscate, the messages in the report". However, Trenberth concludes that the SPM is a "reasonably balanced summary".

US NRC (2001) concluded that the WGI SPM and Technical Summary are "consistent" with the full WGI report. US NRC (2001) stated:

... the full [WGI] report is adequately summarized in the Technical Summary. The full WGI report and its Technical Summary are not specifically directed at policy. The Summary for Policymakers reflects less emphasis on communicating the basis for uncertainty and a stronger emphasis on areas of major concern associated with human-induced climate change. This change in emphasis appears to be the result of a summary process in which scientists work with policy makers on the document. Written responses from U.S. coordinating and lead scientific authors to the committee indicate, however, that (a) no changes were made without the consent of the convening lead authors (this group represents a fraction of the lead and contributing authors) and (b) most changes that did occur lacked significant impact.

=== IPCC process ===
There are a small number of climate scientists who disagree with aspects of the IPCC's work. Perhaps the best known is Richard Lindzen, professor of meteorology at the Massachusetts Institute of Technology.

A report by the UK Parliament's House of Lords Economic Affairs Select Committee (EAC, 2005) contains criticisms of the IPCC's work, including the "SRES" greenhouse gas emissions scenarios, which are used in the TAR. The Economic Affairs Select Committee is made up of members of the House of Lords, which scrutinizes and votes on government legislation. One of the criticisms made by the EAC (2005) is an apparent inconsistency between the Working Group II Summary for Policymakers and a statement made in the full WGII report: "The IPCC Summary for policy makers says that economic studies underestimate damage, whereas the chapter says the direction of the bias is not known."

The UK Government issued a response to the report by EAC (2005). The UK Government acknowledged the discrepancy between the WGII SPM and full WGII report which was referred to by the EAC (2005), but remained generally supportive of the IPCC's procedures. The UK Government rebutted a number of other criticisms of the TAR which were made by the EAC (2005).

=== Discussion of the "hockey stick" graph ===
The original northern hemisphere hockey stick graph of Mann, Bradley & Hughes 1999, smoothed curve shown in blue with its uncertainty range in light blue, overlaid with green dots showing the 30-year global average of the PAGES 2k Consortium 2013 reconstruction. The red curve shows measured global mean temperature, according to HadCRUT4 data from 1850 to 2013.

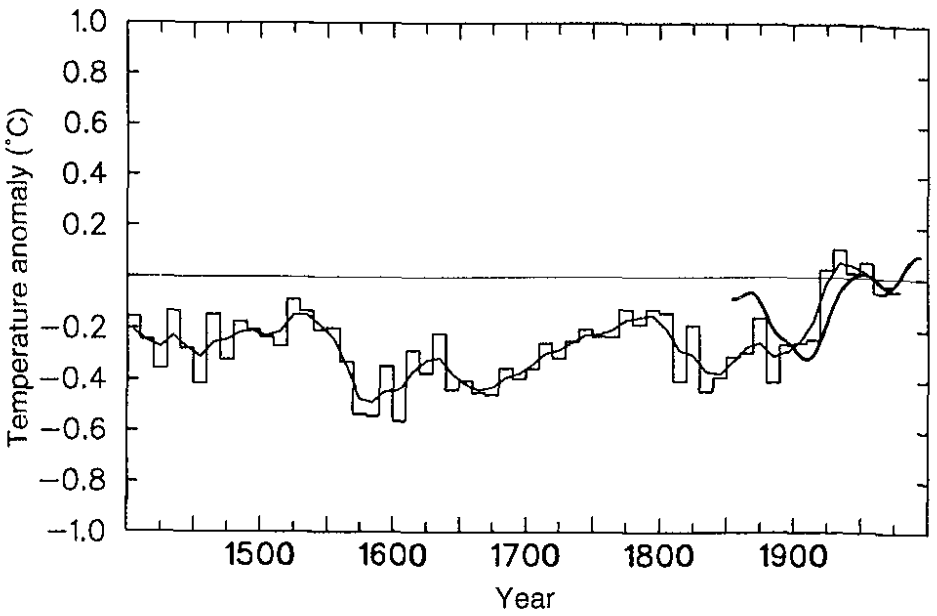
Figure 3.20 on p. 175 of the IPCC Second Assessment Report

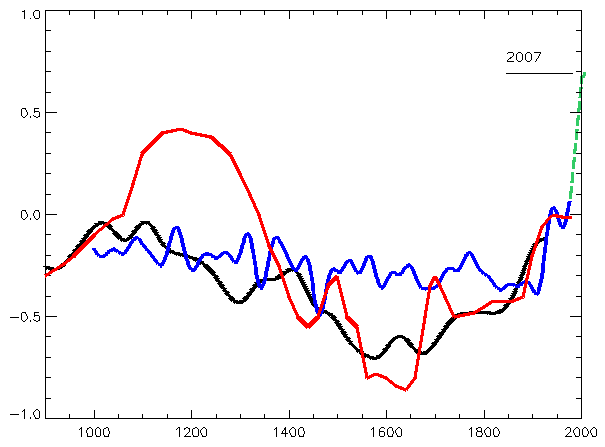
Comparison of MBH99 40-year average from proxy records, as used in IPCC TAR 2001 (blue), with IPCC 1990 schematic Figure 7.1.c (red) [based on Lamb 1965 extrapolating from central England temperatures and other historical records]; central England temperatures to 2007 shown from Jones et al. 2009 (green dashed line). Also shown, Moberg et al. 2005 low frequency signal (black).

The third assessment report (TAR) prominently featured a graph labeled "Millennial Northern Hemisphere temperature reconstruction" based on a 1999 paper by Michael E. Mann, Raymond S. Bradley and Malcolm K. Hughes (MBH99), which has been referred to as the "hockey stick graph". This graph extended the similar graph in Figure 3.20 from the IPCC Second Assessment Report of 1995, and differed from a schematic in the first assessment report that lacked temperature units, but appeared to depict larger global temperature variations over the past 1000 years, and higher temperatures during the Medieval Warm Period than the mid 20th century. The schematic was not an actual plot of data, and was based on a diagram of temperatures in central England, with temperatures increased on the basis of documentary evidence of medieval vineyards in England. Even with this increase, the maximum it showed for the Medieval Warm Period did not reach temperatures recorded in central England in 2007. The MBH99 finding was supported by cited reconstructions by Jones et al. 1998, Pollack, Huang & Shen 1998, Crowley & Lowery 2000 and Briffa 2000, using differing data and methods. The Jones et al. and Briffa reconstructions were overlaid with the MBH99 reconstruction in Figure 2.21 of the IPCC report.

These studies were widely presented as demonstrating that the current warming period is exceptional in comparison to temperatures between 1000 and 1900, and the MBH99 based graph featured in publicity. Even at the draft stage, this finding was disputed by contrarians: in May 2000 Fred Singer's Science and Environmental Policy Project held a press event on Capitol Hill, Washington, D.C., featuring comments on the graph Wibjörn Karlén and Singer argued against the graph at a United States Senate Committee on Commerce, Science and Transportation hearing on 18 July 2000. Denialist John Lawrence Daly featured a modified version of the IPCC 1990 schematic, which he mis-identified as appearing in the IPCC 1995 report, and asserted that "Overturning its own previous view in the 1995 report, the IPCC presented the 'Hockey Stick' as the new orthodoxy with hardly an apology or explanation for the abrupt U-turn since its 1995 report". Criticism of the MBH99 reconstruction in a review paper, which was quickly discredited in the Soon and Baliunas controversy, was picked up by the Bush administration, and a Senate speech by US Republican senator James Inhofe alleged that "manmade global warming is the greatest hoax ever perpetrated on the American people". The data and methodology used to produce the "hockey stick graph" was criticized in papers by Stephen McIntyre and Ross McKitrick, and in turn the criticisms in these papers were examined by other studies and comprehensively refuted by Wahl & Ammann 2007, which showed errors in the methods used by McIntyre and McKitrick.

On 23 June 2005, Rep. Joe Barton, chairman of the House Committee on Energy and Commerce, wrote joint letters with Ed Whitfield, chairman of the Subcommittee on Oversight and Investigations, demanding full records on climate research, as well as personal information about their finances and careers, from Mann, Bradley and Hughes. Sherwood Boehlert, chairman of the House Science Committee, said this was a "misguided and illegitimate investigation" apparently aimed at intimidating scientists, and at his request the U.S. National Academy of Sciences arranged for its National Research Council to set up a special investigation. The National Research Council's report agreed that there were some statistical failings, but these had little effect on the graph, which was generally correct. In a 2006 letter to Nature, Mann, Bradley, and Hughes pointed out that their original article had said that "more widespread high-resolution data are needed before more confident conclusions can be reached" and that the uncertainties were "the point of the article".

=== Sea level rise predictions ===
An example of scientific research which suggests that previous estimates by the IPCC, far from overstating dangers and risks, have actually understated them is a study on projected rises in sea levels. When the researchers' analysis was "applied to the possible scenarios outlined by the Intergovernmental Panel on Climate Change (IPCC), the researchers found that in 2100 sea levels would be 0.5–1.4 m [50–140 cm] above 1990 levels. These values are much greater than the 9–88 cm as projected by the IPCC itself in its Third Assessment Report, published in 2001". This may have been due, in part, to the expanding human understanding of climate. Greg Holland from the National Center for Atmospheric Research, who reviewed a multi-meter sea level rise study by Jim Hansen, noted "There is no doubt that the sea level rise, within the IPCC, is a very conservative number, so the truth lies somewhere between IPCC and Jim."

== See also ==
- Attribution of recent climate change
- Avoiding Dangerous Climate Change, an international conference on the topic
- Climate change
- Carbon dioxide equivalent
- Effects of global warming
- Energy conservation
- Energy policy
- Global warming controversy
- Global climate model
- World energy resources and consumption
