= Fatima Denton =

Co-ordinator for the African Climate Policy Centre

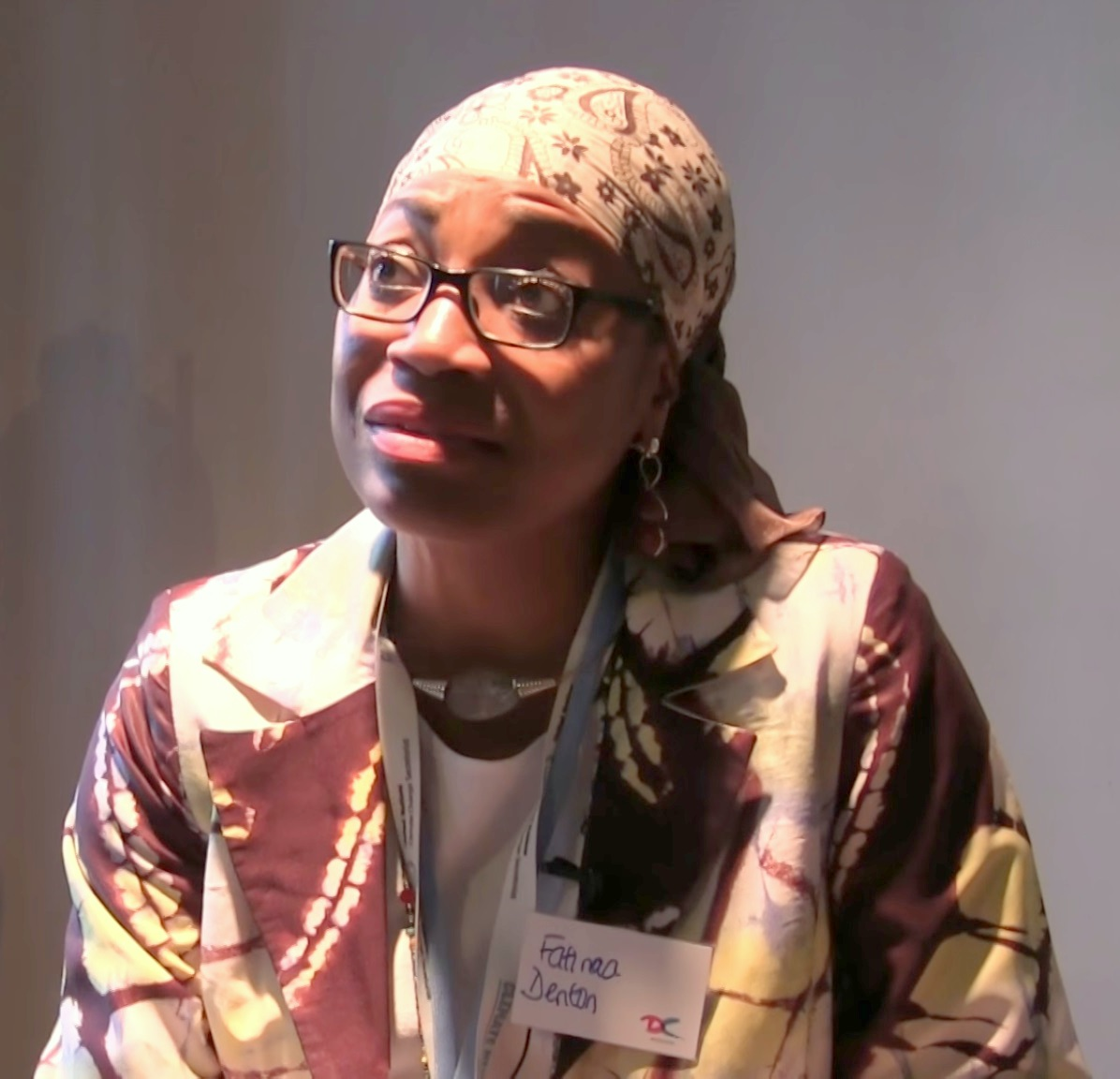
- Fatima Denton in a 2016 interview with the International Institute for Environment and Development
- Born: August 1966 (age 59–60)
- Education: University of Birmingham
- Awards: 2015 Barbara Ward Lecturer
- Scientific career
- Workplaces: United Nations Economic Commission for Africa (UNECA)

External videos
- “Fatima Denton calls for the narrative on climate change and Africa to be rewritten“, 2014 Barbara Ward Lecture
- “Exclusive Interview with Dr. Fatima Denton, United Nations Economic Commission for Africa“, The Times of Africa
- “Interview with Fatima Denton, African Climate Policy Centre, UNECA”, UNISDR

Fatima Denton (born August 1966) is a British-Gambian climatologist. She is the director at the Ghanaian branch of the United Nations University, at the UNU Institute for Natural Resources in Africa (UNU-INRA) in Accra. She focuses on innovation, science, technology and natural resource management. She partners with countries such as Benin and Liberia to develop and implement country needs assessment missions.

Fatima Denton writes about topics including renewable energy, sustainable development, climate change, climate change and gender, climate change adaptation, vulnerability, food security and water and energy poverty. She is a lead author for Working Group II's Fifth Assessment of the Intergovernmental Panel on Climate Change (IPCC), the IPCC Special Report on Renewable Energy Sources and Climate Change Mitigation (SRREN), as well as on the IPCC Working Group III’s Sixth Assessment Report, and the IPCC’s Special Report on Climate Change and Land (SRCCL). She has served on a number of scientific committees including the Independent Science Panel (ISP) of the CGIAR Climate Change and Food Security Programme (CCAFS).

Honours

Denton was the 2015 Barbara Ward Lecturer, challenging policy-makers, researchers, and academics in London to reexamine Africa and its relationship to climate change. She is a speaker at the 2016 Borlaug Dialogue International Symposium, one of several "Women Leaders Driving Agricultural Transformation in Africa". In 2021, she was named among Apolitical’s 100 Most Influential People in Gender Policy along Stella Nyanzi and Priscilla Ikos Usiobaifo.

== Early life and education ==
Fatima Denton was born August 1966 and raised in The Gambia. After primary and secondary schooling in Banjul, she completed a wide-ranging array of undergraduate studies at

Cheikh Anta Diop University in Dakar, Senegal (humanities), the University of Besançon, France, (applied linguistics and interpreting), the University of Paris – la Sorbonne Paris IV (humanities) and the École des Hautes Études Internationales et Politiques (HEIP) (international relations). She earned her PhD in political science and development studies from the University of Birmingham (UK).

== Career ==
Dr. Denton has published reports, books, and peer-reviewed articles that advocate for a multi-dimensional view of development that renders it more sustainable. Fatima Denton worked as a policy analyst and project coordinator with the energy program of Enda Tiers Monde in Senegal. Her work addressed issues including sustainable development, climate and gender, climate change vulnerability and adaptation, food security, local governance, water, and energy poverty in the Sahel. Her expertise in Benin has contributed to establishing a framework that evaluates adaptive interventions across Africa. "Transformational change" demands local ownership of widespread initiatives that are supported by the higher-level stakeholders. She advocates for a new narrative on climate change in Africa by viewing it as an opportunity. Instead of “standing knee-deep in the river and dying of thirst,” she argues that climate change strategies and agricultural development can be united, or similarly, increased public engagement can elicit technological innovation. She specifically argues that the strategic use of African resources has the capacity to decrease African nations’ dependency on the international community for sustainable growth.

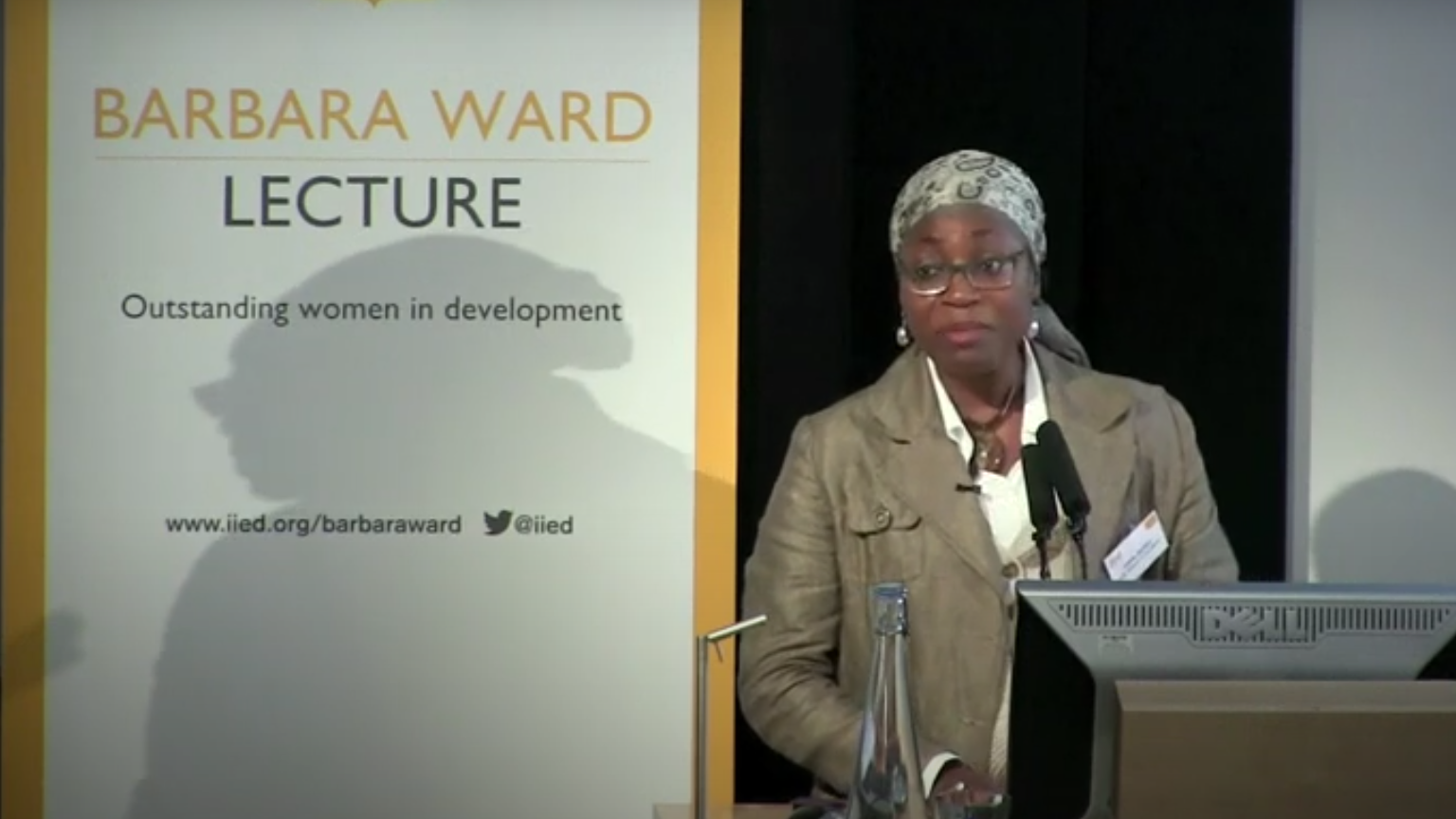
Fatima Denton in 2014 giving the Barbara Ward Lecture

Fatima Denton worked as a senior energy planner with the United Nations Environment Programme (UNEP) at Risø Centre in Denmark. She was a member of UNEP's Scientific and Technical Advisory Panel. She has paid particular attention to the role of women, pointing out their absence from planning and development processes, the unequal impact of disasters and climate change given gendered labour roles and social status, and the need to include women in developing effective energy policies. Solutions cannot solely focus on technology and infrastructure; they must also consider community-focused research and analysis of multiple socio-economic and political-institutional factors leading to vulnerability. For example, she contributed to research that suggests the adoption of new agricultural strategies, are positively correlated with young workers (ages 6–14), and in female-headed households.

Fatima Denton joined the International Development Research Centre (IDRC) in 2006, where she has been a leader in strategies for climate change adaptation. As Programme Leader at the IDCR, Denton was involved in the management of numerous high profile research initiatives and projects that promoted environmental sustainability across African countries.

As coordinator of the African Climate Policy Centre, Denton played a key role advocating for the impactful and decisive goals that African nations should strive for going into the COP 21 meetings for the development of the UN Paris Agreement. In the interest of Africa’s particular vulnerability to the effects of global warming, she outlined that an assertive and responsible approach should be adopted by all countries, regardless of the varying contribution to climate change.

In 2017, Denton stated her advocacy for Climate Information Services (CIS) and its more enthusiastic implementation into the policies of African countries in an effort to counteract poverty and the negative effects of climate.

She was the Officer-in-Charge of the Special Initiatives Division and the Co-ordinator for the African Climate Policy Centre (ACPC) of the United Nations Economic Commission for Africa (UNECA), based in Addis Ababa, Ethiopia from 2013 until 2018.

On September 10, 2018, Denton was appointed as Director at the Ghanaian branch of the United Nations University, specifically, at the UNU Institute for Natural Resources in Africa (UNU-INRA).

She also contributed to the International Institute on Environment and Development (IIED) as a trustee and as a member in the international research program Future Earth advisory board.

She was elected vice-chair of working group II of the IPCC in July 2023.
