= Special Report on Global Warming of 1.5 °C =

2018 United Nations climate change report

The Special Report on Global Warming of 1.5 °C (SR15) was published by the Intergovernmental Panel on Climate Change (IPCC) on 8 October 2018. The report, approved in Incheon, South Korea, includes over 6,000 scientific references, and was prepared by 91 authors from 40 countries. In December 2015, the 2015 United Nations Climate Change Conference called for the report. The report was delivered at the United Nations' 48th session of the IPCC to "deliver the authoritative, scientific guide for governments" to deal with climate change. Its key finding is that meeting a 1.5 °C (2.7 °F) target is possible but would require "deep emissions reductions" and "rapid, far-reaching and unprecedented changes in all aspects of society". Furthermore, the report finds that "limiting global warming to 1.5 °C compared with 2 °C would reduce challenging impacts on ecosystems, human health and well-being" and that a 2 °C temperature increase would exacerbate extreme weather, rising sea levels and diminishing Arctic sea ice, coral bleaching, and loss of ecosystems, among other impacts.

SR15 also has modelling that shows that, for global warming to be limited to 1.5 °C, "Global net human-caused emissions of carbon dioxide (CO_{2}) would need to fall by about 45 percent from 2010 levels by 2030, reaching 'net zero' around 2050." The reduction of emissions by 2030 and its associated changes and challenges, including rapid decarbonisation, was a key focus on much of the reporting which was repeated through the world.

When the Paris Agreement was adopted, the UNFCCC invited the Intergovernmental Panel on Climate Change to write a special report on "How can humanity prevent the global temperature rise more than 1.5 degrees above pre-industrial level". Its full title is "Global Warming of 1.5 °C, an IPCC special report on the impacts of global warming of 1.5 °C above pre-industrial levels and related global greenhouse gas emission pathways, in the context of strengthening the global response to the threat of climate change, sustainable development, and efforts to eradicate poverty".

The finished report summarizes the findings of scientists, showing that maintaining a temperature rise to below 1.5 °C remains possible, but only through "rapid and far-reaching transitions in energy, land, urban and infrastructure..., and industrial systems". Meeting the Paris target of 1.5 °C (2.7 °F) is possible but would require "deep emissions reductions", "rapid", "far-reaching and unprecedented changes in all aspects of society". In order to achieve the 1.5 °C target, CO_{2} emissions must decline by 45% (relative to 2010 levels) by 2030, reaching net zero by around 2050. Deep reductions in non-CO_{2} emissions (such as nitrous oxide and methane) will also be required to limit warming to 1.5 °C. Under the pledges of the countries entering the Paris Accord, a sharp rise of 3.1 to 3.7 °C is still expected to occur by 2100. Holding this rise to 1.5 °C avoids the worst effects of a rise by even 2 °C. However, a warming of even 1.5 degrees will still result in large-scale drought, famine, heat stress, species die-off, loss of entire ecosystems, and loss of habitable land, throwing more than 100 million into poverty. Effects will be most drastic in arid regions including the Middle East and the Sahel in Africa, where fresh water will remain in some areas following a 1.5 °C rise in temperatures but are expected to dry up completely if the rise reaches 2 °C.

== Main statements ==
Cover of the Special Report on Global Warming of 1.5 °C

The report states that global warming would likely rise to 1.5 °C above pre-industrial levels (defined as being the average during 1850–1900) between 2030 and 2052 if warming continues at the 2018 rate. SR15 provides a summary of, on one hand, existing research on the impact that a warming of 1.5 °C (equivalent to 2.7 °F) would have on the planet, and on the other hand, the steps needed to limit global warming to 1.5 °C.

Even assuming full implementation of conditional and unconditional Nationally Determined Contributions submitted by nations in the Paris Agreement, net emissions would increase compared to 2010, leading to a warming of about 3 °C by 2100, and more afterwards. In contrast, limiting warming below or close to 1.5 °C would require to decrease net emissions by around 45% by 2030 and reach net zero emissions by 2050 (i.e. keeping total cumulative emissions within a carbon budget). Even just for limiting global warming to below 2 °C, CO_{2} emissions should decline by 25% by 2030 and by 100% by 2075.

Pathways (i.e. scenarios and portfolios of mitigation options) that would allow such reduction by 2050 describe a rapid transition towards producing electricity through lower-emission methods, and increasing use of electricity instead of other fuels in sectors such as transportation. On average, the pathways describing the proportion of primary energy produced by renewables as increasing to 60%, while the proportion produced by coal drops to 5% and oil to 13%. Most pathways describe a larger role for nuclear energy and carbon capture and storage, and less usage of natural gas. They also assume that other measures are simultaneously undertaken: e.g. non-CO_{2} emissions (such as methane, black carbon, nitrous oxide) are to be similarly reduced, energy demand is unchanged, reduced by even 30% or offsetted by an unprecedented scale of carbon dioxide removal methods yet to be developed, while new policies and research allows to improve efficiency in agriculture and industry.

Pathways limiting global warming to 1.5 °C with no or limited overshoot would require rapid and far-reaching transitions in energy, land, urban and infrastructure (including transport and buildings), and industrial systems. These systems transitions are unprecedented in terms of scale, but not necessarily in terms of speed, and imply deep emissions reductions in all sectors, a wide portfolio of mitigation options and a significant upscaling of investments in those options. The rates of system changes [...] have occurred in the past within specific sectors, technologies and spatial contexts, but there is no documented historic precedent for their scale. — IPCC, SR15 Summary for policymakers, p. 17

=== Impact of 1.5 °C or 2 °C warming ===
According to the report, with global warming of 1.5 °C there would be increased risks to "health, livelihoods, food security, water supply, human security, and economic growth". Impact vectors include reduction in crop yields and nutritional quality. Livestock are also affected with rising temperatures through "changes in feed quality, spread of diseases, and water resource availability". "Risks from some vector-borne diseases, such as malaria and dengue fever, are projected to increase."

"Limiting global warming to 1.5°C, compared with 2°C, could reduce the number of people both exposed to climate-related risks and susceptible to poverty by up to several hundred million by 2050." Climate-related risks associated with increasing global warming depend on geographic location, "levels of development and vulnerability", and the speed and reach of climate mitigation and climate adaptation practices. For example, "urban heat islands amplify the impacts of heatwaves in cities." In general, "countries in the tropics and Southern Hemisphere subtropics are projected to experience the largest impacts on economic growth."

==== Weather, sea level and ice ====
Many regions and seasons experience warming greater than the global annual average, e.g. "2–3 times higher in the Arctic. Warming is generally higher over land than over the ocean," and it correlates with temperature extremes (which are projected to warm up to twice more on land than the global mean surface temperature) as well as precipitation extremes (both heavy rain and droughts). The assessed levels of risk generally increased compared to the previous IPCC report.

The "global mean sea level is projected rise (relative to 1986–2005) by 0.26 to 0.77 m by 2100 for 1.5 °C global warming" and about 0.1 m more for 2 °C. A difference of 0.1 m may correspond to 10 million more or fewer people exposed to related risks. "Sea level rise will continue beyond 2100 even if global warming is limited to 1.5 °C. Around 1.5 °C to 2 °C of global warming," irreversible instabilities could be triggered in Antarctica and "Greenland ice sheet, resulting in multi-metre rise in sea level." "An ice-free Arctic summer is projected once per century" (per decade) for 1.5 °C (respectively 2 °C). "Limiting global warming to 1.5 °C rather than 2 °C is projected to prevent the thawing over centuries of a permafrost area in the range of 1.5 to 2.5 million km^{2}."

==== Ecosystems ====
"A decrease in global annual catch for marine fisheries of about 1.5 or 3 million tonnes for 1.5 °C or 2 °C of global warming" is projected by one global fishery model cited in the report. Coral reefs are projected to decline by a further 70–90% at 1.5 °C, and even more than 99% at 2 °C. "Of 105,000 species studied, 18% of insects, 16% of plants and 8% of vertebrates fare projected to lose over half of their climatically determined geographic range for global warming of 2 °C."

Approximately "4% or 13% of the global terrestrial land area is projected to undergo a transformation of ecosystems from one type to another" at 1 °C or 2 °C, respectively. "High-latitude tundra and boreal forests are particularly at risk of climate change-induced degradation and loss, with woody shrubs already encroaching into the tundra and will proceed with further warming."

=== Limiting the temperature increase ===
Human activities (anthropogenic greenhouse gas emissions) have already contributed 0.8–1.2 °C (1.4–2.2 °F) of warming. Nevertheless, the gases which have been emitted so far are unlikely to cause global temperature to rise to 1.5 °C alone, meaning a global temperature rise to 1.5 °C above pre-industrial levels is avoidable, assuming net zero emissions are reached soon.

==== Carbon budget ====
Limiting global warming to 1.5 °C requires staying within a total carbon budget, i.e. limiting total cumulative emissions of CO_{2}. In other words, if net anthropogenic CO_{2} emissions are kept above zero, a global warming of 1.5 °C and more will eventually be reached.

The value of the total net anthropogenic CO_{2} budget since the pre-industrial era is not assessed in the report. Estimates of 400–800 GtCO_{2} (gigatonnes of CO_{2}) for the remaining budget are given (580 GtCO_{2} and 420 GtCO_{2} for a 50% and 66% probability of limiting warming to 1.5 °C, using global mean surface air temperature (GSAT); or 770 and 570 GtCO_{2}, for 50% and 66% probabilities, using global mean surface temperature (GMST)). This is about 300 GtCO_{2} more compared to a previous IPCC report, due to updated understanding and further advances in methods.

Emissions around the time of the report were depleting this budget at 42±3 GtCO_{2} per year. Anthropogenic emissions from the pre-industrial period to the end of 2017 are estimated to have reduced the budget for 1.5 °C by approximately 2200±320 GtCO_{2}.

The estimates for the budget come with significant uncertainties, associated with: climate response to CO_{2} and non-CO_{2} emissions (these contribute about ±400 GtCO_{2} in uncertainty), the level of historic warming (±250 GtCO_{2}), potential additional carbon release from future permafrost thawing and methane release from wetlands (reducing the budget by up to 100 GtCO_{2} over the century), and the level of future non-CO_{2} mitigation (±400 GtCO_{2}).

==== Necessary emission reductions ====
Current nationally stated mitigation ambitions, as submitted under the Paris Agreement, would lead to global greenhouse gas emissions of 52–58 GtCO_{2}eq per year, by 2030. "Pathways reflecting these ambitions would not limit global warming to 1.5 °C, even if supplemented by very challenging increases in the scale and ambition of emissions reductions after 2030." Instead, they are "broadly consistent" with a warming of about 3 °C by 2100, and more afterwards.

Limit global warming to 1.5 °C with no or limited overshoot would require reducing emissions to below 35 GtCO_{2}eq per year in 2030, regardless of the modelling pathway chosen. Most fall within 25–30 GtCO_{2}eq per year, a 40–50% reduction from 2010 levels.

The report says that for limiting warming to below 1.5 C "global net human-caused emissions of CO_{2} would need to fall by about 45% from 2010 levels by 2030, reaching net zero around 2050." Even just for limiting global warming to below 2 °C, CO_{2} emissions should decline by 25% by 2030 and by 100% by 2070.

Non-CO_{2} emissions should decline in more or less similar ways. This involves deep reductions in emissions of methane and black carbon: at least 35% of both by 2050, relative to 2010, to limit warming near 1.5 °C. Such measures could be undertaken in the energy sector and by reducing nitrous oxide and methane from agriculture, methane from the waste sector, and some other sources of black carbon and hydrofluorocarbons.

On timescales longer than tens of years, it may still be necessary to sustain net negative CO_{2} emissions and/or further reduce non-CO_{2} radiative forcing (*), in order to prevent further warming (due to Earth system feedbacks), reverse ocean acidification, and minimise sea level rise.

(*) Non-CO_{2} emissions included in this Report are all anthropogenic emissions other than CO_{2} that result in radiative forcing. These include short-lived climate forcers, such as methane, some fluorinated gases, ozone precursors, aerosols or aerosol precursors, such as black carbon and sulphur dioxide, respectively, as well as long-lived greenhouse gases, such as nitrous oxide or some fluorinated gases. The radiative forcing associated with non-CO_{2} emissions and changes in surface albedo is referred to as non-CO_{2} radiative forcing.

==== Pathways to 1.5 °C ====
Various pathways are considered, describing scenarios for mitigation of global warming, including portfolios for energy supply and negative emission technologies (like afforestation or carbon dioxide removal).

Examples of actions consistent with the 1.5 °C pathway include "shifting to low- or zero-emission power generation, such as renewables; changing food systems, such as diet changes away from land-intensive animal products; electrifying transport and developing 'green infrastructure', such as building green roofs, or improving energy efficiency by smart urban planning, which will change the layout of many cities." As another example, an increase of forestation by 10,000,000 square kilometres (3,900,000 mi^{2}) by 2050 relative to 2010 would be required.

The pathways also assume an increase in annual investments in low-carbon energy technologies and energy efficiency by roughly a factor of four to ten by 2050 compared to 2015.

Model pathways with no or limited overshoot of 1.5 °C
P1	P2	P3	P4
A scenario with low energy demand (LED)	S1, based on SSP1	S2, based on SSP2	S5, based on SSP5
Grubler et al., 2018	Shared Socio-Economic Pathway 1 (SSP1: Sustainable development)	Shared Socio-Economic Pathway 2 (SSP2: Middle of the road)	Shared Socio-Economic Pathway 5 (SSP5: Fossil-fuelled development)

==== Carbon dioxide removal ====
The emission pathways that reach 1.5 °C contained in the report assume the use of carbon dioxide removal (CDR) to offset for remaining emissions. Pathways that overshoot the goal rely on CDR to remove carbon dioxide at a rate that exceeds remaining emissions in order to return to 1.5 °C. However, understanding is still limited about the effectiveness of net negative emissions to reduce temperatures after an overshoot. Reversing an overshoot of 0.2 °C might not be achievable given considerable implementation challenges. The report highlights a CDR technology called bioenergy with carbon capture and storage (BECCS). The report notes that apart from afforestation/reforestation and ecosystem restoration, "the feasibility of massive-scale deployment of many CDR technologies remains an open question", with areas of uncertainty regarding technology upscaling, governance, ethical issues, policy and carbon cycle. The report notes that CDR technology is in its infancy and the feasibility is an open question. Estimates from recent literature are cited, giving a potential of up to 5 GtCO2 per year for BECCS and up to 3.6 GtCO2 per year for afforestation.

==== Solar radiation management ====
The report describes several proposals for solar radiation management (SRM). It concludes that SRMs have potential to limit warming, but "face large uncertainties and knowledge gaps as well as substantial risks, [...] and constraints"; "the impacts of SRM (both biophysical and societal), costs, technical feasibility, governance and ethical issues associated need to be carefully considered." An analysis of the geoengineering proposals published in Nature Communication confirmed findings of the SR15, stating that "all are in early stages of development, involve substantial uncertainties and risks, and raise ethical and governance dilemmas. Based on present knowledge, climate geoengineering techniques cannot be relied on to significantly contribute to meeting the Paris Agreement temperature goals".

== Process ==
There are three IPCC working groups: Working Group I (WG I), co-chaired by Valerie Masson-Delmotte and Panmao Zhai, covers the physical science of climate change. Working Group II (WG II), co-chaired by Hans-Otto Pörtner and Debra Roberts, examines "impacts, adaptation and vulnerability". The "mitigation of climate change" is dealt with by Working Group III (WG III), co-chaired by Priyardarshi Shukla and Jim Skea. The "Task Force on National Greenhouse Gas Inventories" "develops methodologies for measuring emissions and removals". There are also Technical Support Units that guide "the production of IPCC assessment reports and other products".

=== Contributors ===
Researchers from 40 countries, representing 91 authors and editors contributed to the report, which includes over 6,000 scientific references.

== Reactions ==
=== Researchers ===
In his 1 October 2018 opening statement at the 48th Session held in Incheon, Korea, Hoesung Lee, who has been Chair of the IPCC since 6 October 2015, described this IPCC meeting as "one of the most important" in its history. Debra Roberts, IPCC contributor called it the "largest clarion bell from the science community". Roberts hopes "it mobilises people and dents the mood of complacency".

In a CBC interview, Paul Romer was asked if the Nobel Prize in economic sciences that he and William Nordhaus received shortly before the SR15 was released, was timed as a message. Romer said that he was optimistic that measures will be taken in time to avert climate catastrophe. Romer compared the angst and lack of political will in imposing a carbon tax to the initial angst surrounding the chlorofluorocarbon (CFC) ban and the positive impact it had on restoring the depleted ozone layer. The 1987 Montreal Protocol banned Chlorofluorocarbon (CFO) and the ozone layer recovered by 2000. In giving the Nobel to Nordhaus and Romer, the Royal Swedish Academy of Sciences cited Nordhaus as saying "the most efficient remedy for problems caused by greenhouse gases is a global scheme of universally imposed carbon taxes".

Howard J. Herzog, a senior research engineer at the Massachusetts Institute of Technology, said that carbon capture and storage technologies, except reforestation, are problematic because of their impact on the environment, health and high cost. In the article there is a link to another article that refers to a study published in the scientific journal "Nature Energy". The study says that we can limit warming to 1.5 degrees without carbon capture and storage, by technological innovation and changing lifestyle.

A 2021 study found that degrowth scenarios, where economic output either "declines" or declines in terms of contemporary economic metrics such as current GDP, have been neglected in considerations of 1.5 °C scenarios in the report, finding that investigated degrowth scenarios "minimize many key risks for feasibility and sustainability compared to technology-driven pathways" with a core problem of such being feasibility in the context of contemporary decision-making of politics and globalized rebound- and relocation-effects.

=== Politics ===
==== Australia ====
Prime Minister Scott Morrison emphasised that the report was not specifically for Australia but for the whole world. Energy Minister Angus Taylor said the Government would "not be distracted" by the IPCC report saying "A debate about climate change and generation technologies in 2050 won't bring down current power prices for Australian households and small businesses." Environment Minister Melissa Price said that scientists are "drawing a very long bow" to say coal should be phased out by 2050 and supported new coal-fired power stations pledging not to legislate the Paris targets. Australia is not on track to meet the commitments under Paris agreement according to modelling conducted by ClimateWorks Australia.

==== Canada ====
Canadian Environment Minister Catherine McKenna acknowledged that the SR15 report would say Canada is not "on track" for 1.5 °C. Canada will not be implementing new plans but it will continue to move forward on a "national price on carbon, eliminating coal-fired power plants, making homes and businesses more energy-efficient, and investing in clean technologies and renewable energy". In response to a question on the sense of urgency of the SR15 report during a 9 October interview on CBC News's Power and Politics Andrew Scheer, the Leader of the Opposition, promised that they are putting forward a "comprehensive plan to reduce CO_{2} without imposing a carbon tax" which Scheer said "raised costs without actually reducing emissions".

==== European Union ====
According to The New York Times, the European Union indicated it might add more ambitious reform goals centered around reducing emissions. On 9 October, the Council of the European Union presented their response to SR15 and their position for the Katowice Climate Change Conference of the Parties (COP 24) held in Poland in December 2018. Their environment ministers noted recent progress in legislation to reduce greenhouse gas emissions. The Council's 9 October pointed to climate change legislation such as, the "new EU 2030 renewable energy target of 32%, the new energy efficiency target of 32.5%, the reform of the EU emission trading system, the emission reduction targets in sectors falling outside the scope of ETS and the integration of land use, land use change and forestry (LULUCF) in the EU's climate and energy framework. Low-emissions and climate resilient growth is possible: The EU is continuing successfully to decouple economic growth from emissions. Between 1990 and 2016, the EU's GDP grew by 53% while total emissions fell by 22.4%. The EU's share of global greenhouse gas emissions fell from an estimated 17.3% in 1990 to 9.9% in 2012.

==== India ====
The Centre for Science and Environment said the repercussions for developing countries such as India, would be "catastrophic" at 2 °C warming and that the impact even at 1.5 °C described in SR15 is much greater than anticipated. Crop yields would decline and poverty would increase.

==== New Zealand ====
The Minister for Climate Change James Shaw said that the Report "has laid out a strong case for countries to make every effort to limit temperature rise to 1.5°C above pre-industrial levels. ... The good news is that the IPCC's report is broadly in line with this Government's direction on climate change and it's highly relevant to the work we are doing with the Zero Carbon Bill."

==== United States ====
President Donald Trump said that he had received the report, but wanted to learn more about those who "drew it" before offering conclusions. In an interview with ABC's "This Week" the director of the National Economic Council, Larry Kudlow, stated, "personally, I think the UN study is way too difficult," and that the authors "overestimate" the likelihood for environmental disasters. Since the publication Trump stated in an interview on 60 Minutes that he didn't know that climate change is manmade and that "it'll change back again", the scientists who say it's worse than ever have "a very big political agenda" and that "we have scientists that disagree with [manmade climate change]."

==== COP24 ====
The governments of four countries (the gas/oil-producers USA, Russia, Saudi Arabia and Kuwait) blocked a proposal to welcome the Intergovernmental Panel on Climate Change's (IPCC) Special Report on Global Warming of 1.5 °C at the 2018 United Nations Climate Change Conference (COP24).

=== Other ===
The "Special Report on Global Warming of 1.5 °C" (SR15) is cited by Greta Thunberg in her speeches "Wherever I Go I Seem to Be Surrounded by Fairy Tales" (United States Congress, Washington DC, 18 September 2019) and "We Are the Change and Change Is Coming" (Week For Future, Climate Strike, Montreal, 27 September 2019), both published in the second edition of No One Is Too Small to Make a Difference.

At the 2019 World Economic Forum, the head of the International Monetary Fund, Kristalina Georgieva, said that: "The big eye opener [into climate change and its effects] was when last year I read [the SR15] IPCC report. I tell you, I could not sleep that night. [...] What have we done?".

== See also ==
- Representative Concentration Pathway (RCP)

== Full report ==
- Masson, Valérie; Zhai, Panmao; Hans-Otto Pörtner; Roberts, Debra; Skea, James Ferguson Jim; Shukla, Priyadarshi R.; Pirani, Anna (2022). Global Warming of 1.5°C: IPCC Special Report on impacts of global warming of 1.5°C above pre-industrial levels in context of strengthening response to climate change, sustainable development, and efforts to eradicate poverty (PDF). Cambridge University Press. doi:10.1017/9781009157940. ISBN 978-1-009-15794-0. Wikidata Q123675901. Archived (PDF) from the original on 2023-06-12.
- Masson, Valérie; Zhai, Panmao; Hans-Otto Pörtner; Roberts, Debra; Skea, James Ferguson Jim; Shukla, Priyadarshi R.; Pirani, Anna (2018). IPCC 2018: SR15 summary for policymakers. Cambridge University Press. doi:10.1017/9781009157940.001. Wikidata Q123675716. Archived from the original on 2023-12-02.
  - Report website, chapters I–V
