= Rosie Motene =

South African actress, film producer, author and activist

- Born: Rosie Motene
- Education: Damelin College; University of the Witwatersrand
- Occupations: Life coach; Counsellor; Speaker; Film producer; Author; Activist
- Known for: Man on Ground (2011); Hotel Rwanda (2004); Generations (TV Series: 2000–2004)

Rosie Motene is a South African actress, author, film producer and activist. She is a Pan African queer and feminist and speaker on GBV and LGBTQI in Africa. She is the author of the 161-paged book, Reclaiming the Soil: A Black Girl's Struggle to Find Her African Self. She is a Pan-African media proprietor and was one of the as the jurors at the fifth edition of Mashariki African Film Festival (MAFF) in 2019. ZAlebs mentioned her as one of the most prevalent cast members of the Urban Brew Studios.

== Career ==
Rosie Motene earned a Bachelor of Arts in Dramatic Arts (Honours) from the University of the Witwatersrand (Wits University) in Johannesburg.

She achieved national prominence for her portrayal of Tsego Motene on the SABC1 soap opera Generations (2000–2004), a role that made her a household name in South Africa. She later became a host and field reporter for Studio 53, a Pan-African lifestyle and travel show on M-Net. She eventually trained and worked as a producer and director on the program.

Rosie made her international film debut in Hotel Rwanda (2004), and later starred as Mandisa in Nothing But the Truth (2008), written and directed by John Kani. The stage version toured internationally with performances at the Sydney Opera House, Brisbane Festival, and various UK cities including London, Leeds, Leicester, Manchester, Birmingham, and Nottingham.

She also appeared in the Heartlines short film The Other Woman, directed by Cindy Lee. Motene co-produced the critically acclaimed film Man on Ground (2011), directed by Akin Omotoso. The film premiered at the Toronto International Film Festival and received international acclaim.

She served as Head of Programming, Productions, and Acquisitions at NTV Uganda and Spark TV, where she conceptualised and executive produced over 30 programs in English and Luganda. Rosie is the producer of The Woman Who Poked the Leopard: The Stella Nyanzi Story, directed by Patience Nitumwesiga.

She founded Waka Talent Agency, one of the first Pan-African talent management companies. The agency represented artists in 14 African countries and closed in 2024.

Rosie has worked in feminist and human rights advocacy for more than two decades. She began her activism with POWA (People Opposing Women Abuse) in 1999 and joined the 1in9 Campaign at its inception in 2006, providing advocacy, consultancy, and feminist mentorship. She is currently developing a documentary about the campaign.

She has served on several boards, including:

   Childline Gauteng (Chairperson)

   Infinite Family

   Johannesburg Children’s Home

   Tomorrow Trust[11]

She currently serves as Co-Chairperson of The Other Foundation and is a board member of the Sexual and Reproductive Justice Coalition (SRJC). Motene has climbed Mount Kilimanjaro twice — first as South Africa's ambassador for UN Women's Africa Unite Campaign to end gender-based violence, and again to raise funds for Tomorrow Trust, generating over R20,000.

She founded Letsatsi Healing Space, a trauma-informed, African-centred healing practice offering counseling, breathwork, reflective writing, and life coaching. In 2018, she published her memoir Reclaiming the Soil: A Black Girl's Struggle to Find Her African Self, which explores themes of identity, cultural reconnection, adoption, and healing.

She currently runs the blog and podcast Speaking Through My World, where she shares insights on African feminism, healing justice, and intersectional activism.

== Filmography ==
=== Films ===
Year	Film	Role	Notes	Ref.
2025	The Woman Who Poked the Leopard	Producer	Documentary	
2011	Man on Ground	Producer	Drama	
2010	Jury Divided	Actress (Juror 2)	Drama	
2008	Nothing But the Truth	Actress (Mandisa)	Comedy, Drama	
2004	Hotel Rwanda	Actress (Receptionist)	Biography, Drama, History	
2004	Gums & Noses	Actress (Scoffing Ad Woman 2)	Comedy	

=== Television series ===
Year	Film	Role	Notes	Ref.
2007	Wild at Heart	Actress (Kenyetta, 1 episode (2007))	TV series (2006–2013), Drama	
2000–2004	Generations	Actress (Tsego Motene (2000–2004), unknown episodes)	TV series (1993 -), Drama	
