= Debra Roberts =

South African climatologist

- Education: University of KwaZulu-Natal (PhD)
- Occupations: Head of Sustainable and Resilient City Initiatives Unit, eThekwini Municipality (Durban, South Africa)
- Known for: IPCC Co-Chair in Working Group II
- Honors: Honorary Professor at University of KwaZulu-Natal, Apolicital's top 100 most influential people in Climate Change policy (2019).

Debra C. Roberts is a South African scientist and one of the six co-chairs of the Intergovernmental Panel on Climate Change. She was elected co-chair of Working Group II for the sixth assessment in 2015.

She is head of the Sustainable and Resilient City Initiatives Unit in eThekwini Municipality (Durban, South Africa).

== Education and career ==
Roberts has a PhD in Urban Biogeography from the (then) University of Natal, South Africa (1991), later consolidated to the University of KwaZulu-Natal. After working as a post-doctoral researcher, she joined local government in 1994. She established the Environmental Planning and Climate Protection Department of eThekwini Municipality (Durban, South Africa) which she led from 1994 to 2016. In 2016 she was appointed to establish the Sustainable and Resilient City Initiatives Unit in Durban and is the city’s first Chief Resilience Officer. She is a part time professor at the University of Twente.

== IPCC work ==
She was a lead author of Chapter 8 (Urban Areas) of Working Group II of the IPCC Fifth Assessment Report and was elected as Co-Chair of Working Group II for the IPCC’s sixth assessment cycle in 2015. She was also a lead author of the IPCC Special Report on Global Warming of 1.5 °C.

== Recognition ==
In 2014, the AfriCAN Climate Consortium gave Roberts their AfriCAN Climate Research Award. She was the 2016 Barbara Ward Lecturer of the International Institute for Environment and Development. She is an honorary professor of the University of KwaZulu-Natal, and was listed in 2019 by public servant organization Apolitical as one of the 100 most influential people in climate change in the world. She received honorary doctorates from the University of Twente in 2022 and from the University of Cape Town in 2023.
