= IIED =

IIED may stand for:

- International Institute for Environment and Development
- Intentional infliction of emotional distress
