= Omowumi Ogunrotimi =

Nigerian lawyer and gender justice advocate

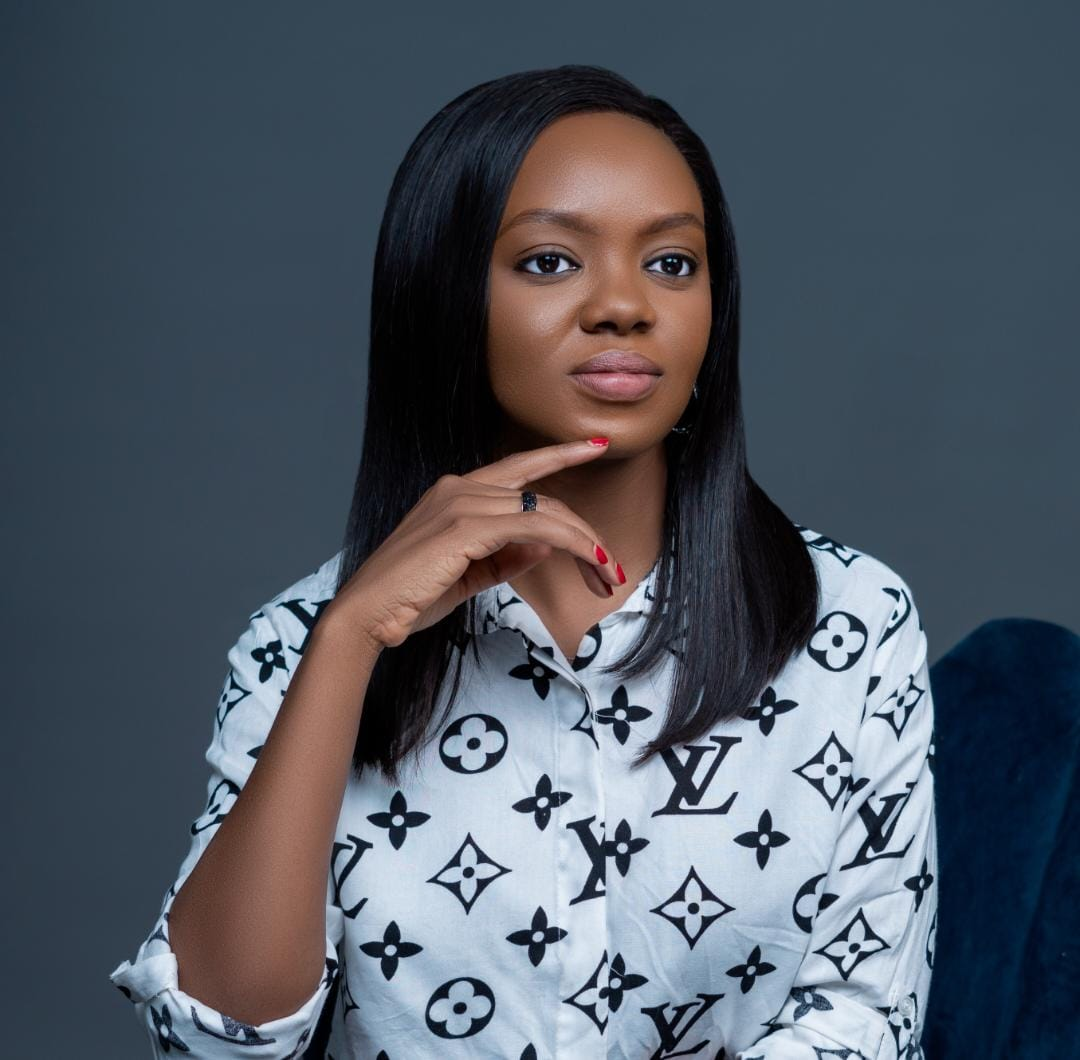
- Born: 1990 (age 35–36)
- Citizenship: Nigerian
- Occupations: Lawyer; Gender justice advocate
- Awards: Mandela Washington Fellowship 2018, Ashoka Fellow 2023, Global Citizen Prize 2025
- Website: gendermobile.org

Omowumi Ogunrotimi (born 1990) is a Nigerian lawyer, gender justice advocate, and social innovator. She is the founder and executive director of the Gender Mobile Initiative, a nonprofit organisation focused on eliminating gender-based violence through policy advocacy, technology, and public education.

In 2023, she was elected as an Ashoka Fellow for her work in preventing sexual harassment in higher education institutions, making her a part of the growing network of African changemakers recognized by Ashoka, which include Njideka Harry, Oreoluwa Lesi, Ngozi Iwere and Princess Olufemi-Kayode.

== Career and advocacy ==
Ogunrotimi has led gender-focused interventions in over 50 rural communities across Nigeria, advocating for safe spaces for vulnerable populations, particularly women and girls. Her initiatives have reached over 100,000 beneficiaries through legal empowerment, public awareness campaigns, and institutional partnerships.

She served as the Deputy Head of the Sectoral Committee on Women and Gender at the African Union Economic, Social and Cultural Council (AU-ECOSOCC), Nigeria.

== Gender Mobile Initiative ==
Founded by Ogunrotimi, the Gender Mobile Initiative (GMI) works to eliminate gender-based violence through policy reform, technology adoption, and capacity building. GMI launched the Campus Safety Initiative, which supports Nigerian universities in developing sexual harassment policies, implementing bystander intervention strategies, and integrating digital tools for case management. GMI also engages in public education, legal support, and research to advance gender equality and improve institutional responses to gender-based violence.

== Recognition ==
In 2018, Ogunrotimi was named one of 20 finalists for the Commonwealth Youth Awards for her contributions to gender equality and youth empowerment. She is an Associate of the Royal Commonwealth Society and was recognized by the Institute for Justice and Reconciliation as one of Africa’s top ten gender justice activists in 2017.

In 2023, she was elected to the Ashoka Fellowship for her systems-change approach to combating sexual harassment in Nigerian universities.

In 2025, Ogunrotimi received the Global Citizen Prize for her leadership in advancing gender equality and creating safe learning environments through the Gender Mobile Initiative.

== Awards ==
- 2017 – Top Ten Gender Justice Activist, Institute for Justice and Reconciliation, South Africa
- 2018 – Commonwealth Youth Awards finalist
- 2018 – Mandela Washington Fellowship Alumni Award recipient
- 2023 – Ashoka Fellow
- 2025 – Global Citizen Prize recipient

== See also ==
- Oreoluwa Lesi – Nigerian Ashoka Fellow focused on digital inclusion and women's tech education
- Njideka Harry – Ashoka Fellow empowering youth and women through technology and entrepreneurship
- Priscilla Ikos Usiobaifo – Nigerian gender rights advocate focused on ending gender-based violence
