= Oreoluwa Lesi =

Nigerian, UK trained economist and IT expert

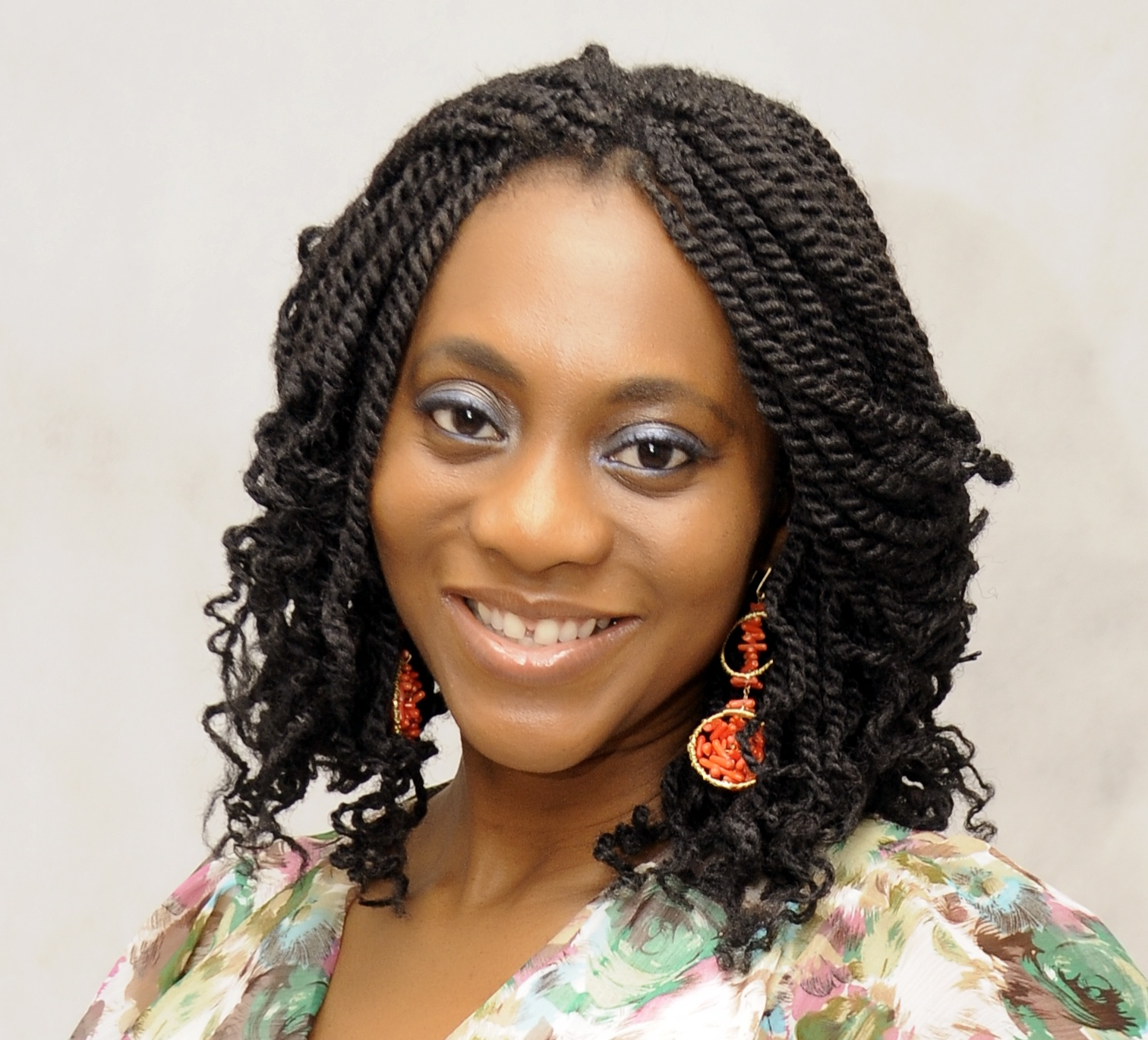
- Born: Oreoluwa Somolu
- Education: University of Essex London School of Economics and Political Science Harvard University Extension School
- Occupation: Social Entrepreneurship
- Known for: Information Technology Literacy Girls Empowerment
- Notable work: She is the founder and executive director of Women's Technology Empowerment Centre (W.TEC), a non-profit organisation that empowers women and girls socially and economically through education in Information technology.
- Website: https://wteconline.org

Oreoluwa Somolu Lesi is a Nigerian social entrepreneur and UK-trained economist and information technology expert. She is the founder and executive director of Women's Technology Empowerment Centre (W.TEC), a non-profit organisation that empowers women and girls socially and economically through education in Information technology. W.TEC was established in the year 2008. She is a recipient of the Anita Borg Institute (ABIE) Change Agent Award. and also is also an Ashoka fellow.

== Early life and education ==
Lesi was born and raised in Nigeria. Her father worked as an electrical engineer, and she developed an early interest in technology during her childhood. As a teenager, she created a software application that was later used to manage operations at her parents’ bookshop.

After her years in high school at Queen's College, Lagos, she studied a diploma course in computer programming. She proceeded to United Kingdom where she studied economics and graduated with bachelor's degree in economics from University of Essex. While at university, she set-up a business typing essays and assignments for students and that lit the first spark about how women could use technology to create economic opportunities.

She also obtained, master's degree in analysis, design and management information from London School of Economics and Political Science. She studied Applied Sciences at Harvard University Extension School

== Career ==
Lesi worked with the Education Development Centre, Inc. in the United States as a research assistant and then technology associate. She returned to Nigeria in the year 2005. In Nigeria, she worked with Lonadek Oil and Gas Consultancy where she managed a CSR Initiative-2020 focused on skills development of young people in the area of science and technology. She established W.TEC in the year 2008, when the technology ecosystem was not as vibrant as it has become over the years. There was also very little awareness of the gender gap in technology and why closing it mattered in 2008, which made her work more challenging.

W.TEC now runs several programmes in Lagos, Anambra and Kwara states, including the She Creates Camps and the W.TEC Academy (technology afterschool clubs) and has impacted over 27,000 young women and teachers. More recently, W.TEC launched the Inclusive Technology for All (IT4All) project in partnership with the Children's Developmental Centre. The project introduces technology and the wider STEM concepts to students with developmental disabilities.

Some key highlights of her work with W.TEC include partnering with the Dr. Omobola Johnson-led Federal Ministry of Communication Technology in 2014 to develop a nationwide girls club called Digital Girls Club, which piloted in 12 schools in each geopolitical zone and further scaled to more schools across Nigeria. The Digital Girls Club featured an engaging curriculum, which was hosted on an online portal that teachers could access and use in their respective schools.

In 2009, Oreoluwa bagged an Anita Borg Change Agent Award and was honoured as fellow of Ashoka in 2013 making her part of the growing network of African changemakers recognized by Ashoka, including Njideka Harry, Omowumi Ogunrotimi, Ngozi Iwere, and Princess Olufemi-Kayode.

W.TEC is frequently recognised for its work as a pioneering organisation in trying to close the gender gap in technology. W.TEC has won awards such as the 2019 EQUALS in Tech award (Skills category) and the 2019 Nigeria Internet Registration Association (NIRA) Presidential Award for Women's Development. W.TEC also emerged as a 2020 WSIS Prizes Champion (Access to Information and Knowledge Category).

In 2019, the inventor of the World Wide Web, Sir Tim Berners-Lee visited W.TEC, as part of a 30-hour tour to 3 cities around the world to celebrate the 30th anniversary of the web. During his visit to W.TEC, he met some of the girls who are participants of W.TEC's programmes. In January 2020, TIME asked a group of six prominent people (including Sir Tim Berners-Lee) to write to a young person or people of their own choosing. Sir Berners-Lee chose to write a letter to the girls of W.TEC in a letter.

Oreoluwa Lesi, CEO of W.TEC, says the organization has spent over decade empowering girls with ICT and Stem skills through camps, mentorship and partnership across Nigeria. She highlighted the growing of participants of women in technology, the success of W.TEC alumni, and the organization's commitment to equipping girls with digital and entrepreneurial skills for future careers.

== Awards and recognition ==
Oreoluwa has received many awards and recognitions including:

- OkayAfrica 100 Women for 2020
- One of the 5 Women Who Defined the Nigerian Tech Space in 2019 by Technext.ng
- 2018 Her Network Woman of the Year in Technology
- 2018 Leading Ladies Africa 100 Most Inspiring Women in Nigeria
- 2017 SME100 & Invicta Top 100 Female-Owned Businesses in Nigeria
- 2016 #YTech100 Special Recognition Award
- 2016 YNaija!’s #YTech100 (Top 100 Young People in Technology of 2016)
- 2014 Leadership Award from La Roche Leadership Foundation
- 2014 YNaija!’s 100 Top 100 Young People in Technology of 2014
- Vision 2020 Youth Empowerment & Restoration Initiative Recognition Award – May 2010
- 2009 Anita Borg Change Agent Award – Anita Borg Institute, Tucson AZ, U.S.A
- 2008 Systers Pass It On Award Winner – Anita Borg Institute

== Fellowships ==
Oreoluwa has received the following fellowships:

- 2020 ICANN 69 Fellow: ICANN fellows are exposed to the workings of the Internet Corporation of Assigned Names & Numbers (ICANN) community, are assigned a mentor, and receive training across different areas of knowledge and skill building before, during, and after an ICANN Public Meeting.
- 2019 ICANN 66 Fellow
- 2014 Vital Voices Lead Fellow: The Vital Voices Lead Fellowship connects, provides training for and gives visibility to extraordinary women who lead NGOs and companies around the world.
- 2013 Ashoka Fellow: Ashoka Fellows are the world’s leading social entrepreneurs. They champion innovative new ideas that transform society’s systems, providing benefits for everyone and improving the lives of millions of people.

== Personal life ==
Lesi is married to Gboyega Lesi and resides in Lagos.

== Publications ==
Year	Title	Work
2026	The Role of 21st Century Booksellers in Realizing SDG 4	Living Sustainably Here: African Perspectives on the SDGs Volume 1 - Paths to Knowledge: Production, Access, Literacy and Sustainable Development
2025	Demystifying Philanthropy in Gender Justice and Digital Rights	Who is on the Line? Connecting Philanthropy to Gender Justice and Digital Rights by African Philanthropy Forum.
2025	Building the Pipeline Supporting Girls in STEM to Become Women in STEM	African Women Trailblazers in STEM: Pioneering Technological and Economic Advancement
2004	Making the Most of On-line Learning: An Introduction to Learning on the Internet	Education Development Center
2006	Telling Our Own Stories: African Women Blogging for Social Change	Gender & Development Journal
2013	Radio for Women's Development Examining the Relationship between Access and Impact	Nokoko Institute of African Studies Carleton University Ottawa, Canada) 2013(3)

== See also ==
- Ommo Clark
- Raquel Kasham Daniel
- Sandra Chukwudozie
