= Priyadarshi R. Shukla =

Indian climate scientist

Priyadarshi R Shukla (PR Shukla) (born 14 June 1950) is an Indian academician and along with James Skea is the co-chair for Working Group III of IPCC. He is a distinguished professor at Ahmedabad University and the chair of the Global Center for Environment and Energy.

== Career ==
He was a faculty member for the National Institute of Design, Ahmedabad, from 1973 to 1975. He pursued his Master's and Ph.D. at Stanford University between 1976 and 1979 in Mathematics. He was associated with the Indian Institute of Management Ahmedabad from 1979 to 2017. In 2015, he was appointed the co-chair of Working Group III of the IPCC.

In October 2017, he was appointed distinguished professor and chair of the Global Centre for Environment and Energy, at Ahmedabad University. He is also a visiting faculty member for the Imperial College of London since 2017.

In 2021, Stanford University featured him in the World's Top 2% Global Scientist List.

== Publication ==
Shukla has more than 100 publications that include research papers, books etc.

He co-authored the 2018 Special Report on Global Warming of 1.5 °C, 2019 Special Report on Climate Change and Land, and the 2022 report on the Mitigation of Climate Change.
