= The Woman Who Poked the Leopard =

2025 documentary film about Ugandan activist Stella Nyanzi

- Directed by: Patience Nitumwesiga
- Produced by: Rosie Motene; Phil Wilmot; Patience Nitumwesiga; Natalia Imaz; Menzi Mhlongo
- Starring: Stella Nyanzi
- Cinematography: Racheal Mambo; Phil Wilmot
- Edited by: Kristen van Schie
- Music by: Sylvia Babirye; Pearl Music Academy
- Production companies: Shakiga Tales parabellum film
- Release date: October 2025 (DOK Leipzig)
- Running time: 108 minutes
- Countries: Uganda; South Africa; Germany; United States
- Languages: English; Luganda

The Woman Who Poked the Leopard is a 2025 documentary film directed by Patience Nitumwesiga in her debut feature-length project. The film chronicles Stella Nyanzi, a Uganda poet, human rights activist and feminist scholar in her resistance against the authoritarian regime of Yoweri Museveni, her campaign for parliamentary office and the toll of her activism on her family and livelihood.

An international co-production involving Uganda, South Africa, Germany and the United States, the film had its world premiere at the 68th DOK Leipzig film festival in October 2025 where it won two prizes and held its African premiere at the 28th Encounters South African International Documentary Festival in June 2026.

== Synopsis ==
The documentary opens in media res establishing Stella Nyanzi as a firebrand activist willing to use crude or blunt approaches to oppose human rights violations in Uganda. On a non-linear timeline, the film interweaves contemporary footage, archival material and intimate family scenes to portray her personal and political life portraying her fight for justice as an intimate resistance fueled by the emotional and physical wounds of her past.

The central event of the film is her 2017 arrest for a vulgar social media post aimed at long-standing Ugandan president Yoweri Museveni who is referred to as a "the Leopard". The film recounts her brutal imprisonment which culminates in a miscarriage of a child she named "Freedom". The film pivots to her unsuccessful parliamentary campaign through Kampala's slums, detailing the obstruction and police brutality faced by multiple opposition figures, like politician Bobi Wine.

As state violence escalates, especially the torture of writer Kakwenza Rukirabashaija, Stella reluctantly flees to exile in Germany with her daughter and twin sons, continuing her scholarly work.

== Production ==
Patience Nitumwesiga met Stella Nyanzi at a Women's March for Security in Kampala, Uganda in 2017. Soon after Nyanzi's release from Jail, Nitumwesiga felt urgency to make a documentary in fear that Nyanzi might be killed.

The film is a co-production between four countries, including director Patience Nitumwesiga's Shakiga Tales in Uganda, South Africa, Germany and the United States. The production journey for the film initiated at the 2021 Durban FilmMart with the Dok Leipzig Accelerator Award, IDFA Spotlight Award, and the Hot Docs Award. In 2022, the film received a grant from maecenia, Frankfurter Stiftung für Frauen in Wissenchaft und Kunst (Frankfurt Foundation for Women in Science and Art) and the MiradasDoc Desarrollo Award The film also received funding from Docubox and Women Make Films. Judy Kibinge, the Docubox CEO celebrated the film for having "an incredibly compelling character" and "such great access".

== Release ==
The film had its world premiere at the 68th DOK Leipzig Festival, which took place from 27 October to 2 November 2025 in Leipzig, Germany, screening in the German Competition Documentary Film section. This was followed by its international premiere at the International Documentary Film Festival Amsterdam in November 2025.

== Reception ==
=== Critical response ===
In Gazettely, critic Kurt Gutierrez described the documentary as "an exacting, immersive study" and praise director Patience Nitumwesiga's "expressionistic framing" and "raw, unforgiving cinema", especially due to the use of semi-nudity as a protest against the law, which Stella Nyanzi notes as "revolutionary rudeness". Gutierrez also commends the sound design and how the non-linear structure "echoes the velocity of her confrontations". Stephen Dalton of The Film Verdict refers to Nyanzi as a "one woman Pussy Riot" and a "gloriously larger-than-life heroine" while noting the film's use of "long takes to tease emotional subtext". In ScreenDaily, Amber Wilkinson describes the film as a "feminist approach" but likens the general themes to the Oscar-nominated Bobi Wine: The Peoples President. Wilkinson criticises the lack of background to Nyanzi's character arguing that by only focusing on recent confrontations, the film is "harder to absorb".

=== Awards ===
The film received two partnership awards at the 2025 DOK Leipzig, the only film to receive more than one. The first was the Prize for Solidarity, Humanity and Fairness by the German trade union ver.di and the second was the DEFA Sponsoring Prize. Producer Rosie Motene remarked that the awards an "absolute honour" on top of the "totally overwhelming" reception from audiences.
