= Njideka Harry =

Nigerian entrepreneur and activist

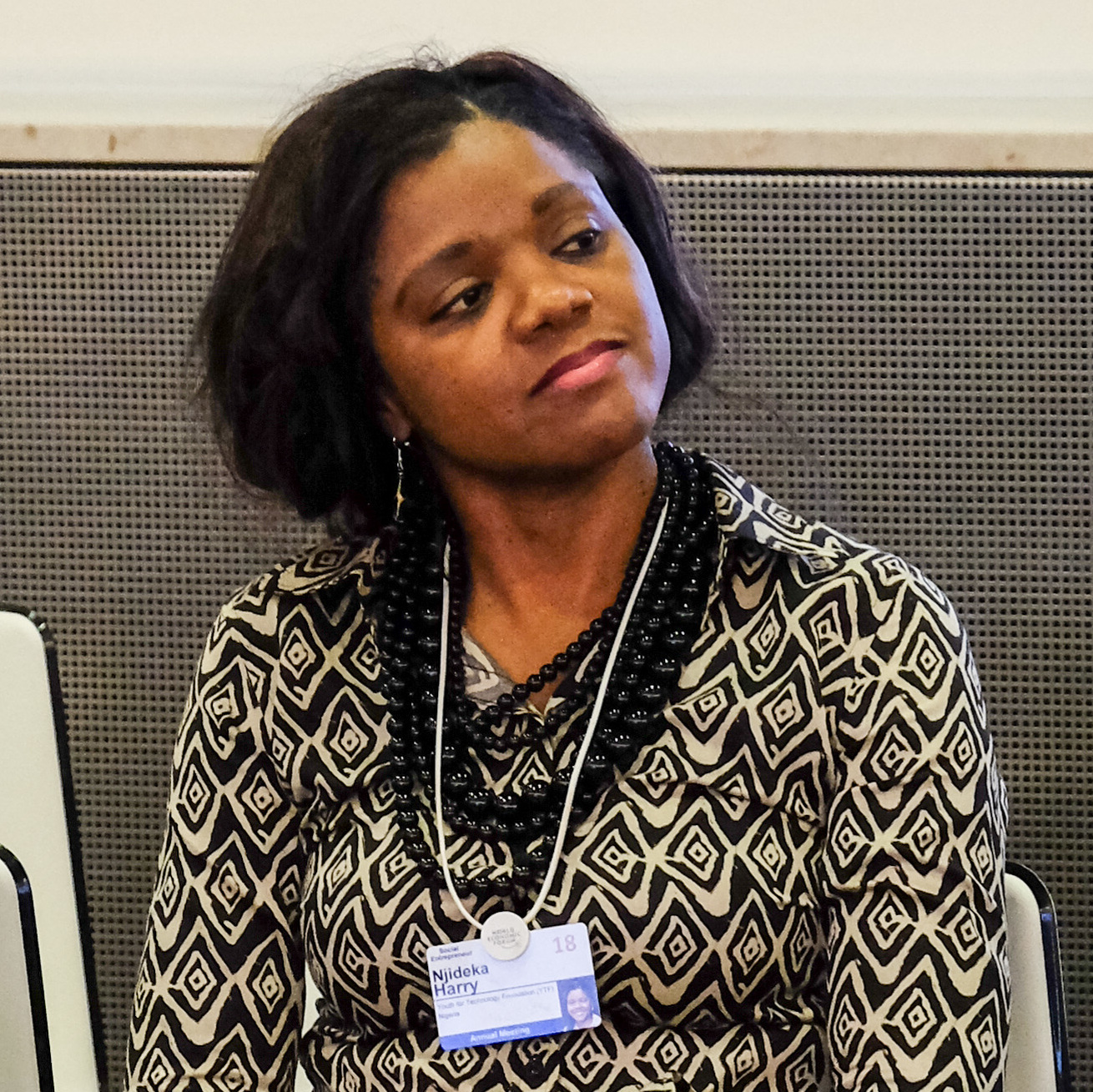
- Njideka Harry at the World Economic Forum annual meeting in 2018
- Born: Ibadan, Nigeria
- Education: University of Massachusetts at Amherst; Stanford University; Kellogg School of Management at Northwestern University
- Notable work: Founded Youth for Technology Foundation in 2001
- Website: www.iamnjideka.com

Njideka Françoise Harry is a World Economic Forum Schwab Foundation for Social Entrepreneurship Fellow.

== Early life and education ==
Harry was born in Ibadan to a Nigerian father and American mother. When the Biafra war broke out, her father won a scholarship to study in the United States which is where he met and married her mother. She earned her Bachelor of Business Administration in Finance and Economics at the University of Massachusetts Amherst. After graduating, she began working for General Electric, and lived/worked in Europe and in the U.S. Harry left GE and began a career at Microsoft, where she founded YTF in 2000. It is a nonprofit that uses technology to improve the lives of young people and women in developing countries. Harry is particularly worried about the state of education in Africa as the system is not just broken, but obsolete. She envisions technology as an enabler.

== Career ==
Harry founded Youth for Technology Foundation in 2001, funded by the Nigerian Government Community Investment Fund and Microsoft Community Affairs Program. She began a Reuters Digital Vision Fellowship at Stanford University in 2004. She worked alongside Megan Smith. Harry was invited to join the Board of the Community Technology Centers Network, where she would meet her mentors Don Samuelson and Stephen Ronan. She earned a Master of Business Administration at the Kellogg School of Management at Northwestern University. She was inspired by fellow MBA classmates to extend the YTF to Colombia. YTF Academy teaches youth and women to use technology in education and entrepreneurship. In 2007, YTF began working in the technology and entrepreneurship space when the organization partnered with the United Nations Development Programme to launch a program to train women entrepreneurs in the Niger Delta in Nigeria.

In 2011, she was nominated into the Ashoka Fellowship as an Ashoka Fellow, making her part of a growing network of African changemakers recognized by Ashoka, including Omowumi Ogunrotimi, Oreoluwa Lesi, Ngozi Iwere, and Princess Olufemi-Kayode. She launched the Women Entrepreneurs and Mobile Value Added Services program in 2012, which provides funding, training, and networking opportunities to thousands of young women, The program is supported by Mastercard. She partnered with the Cherie Blair Foundation for Women in 2013.

Harry is keen on 3D printing. She launched 3D Africa, an educational program that provides training for unemployed African engineers, in 2015. The engineers learn skills in computer-aided design, robotics, IoT, programming and entrepreneurship. The program has been funded by GE, Makerbot, Autodesk and WeTech (Women Enhancing Technology). Recognizing that girls were reluctant to commit to the after school clubs, Harry launched "3D Africa for Girls" to teach girls human centered design and production. The Clinton Global Initiative selected YTF as a commitment partner (Clinton Foundation) in 2016 to launch an initiative providing training to 6,000 girls who are out-of-school in Nigeria. YTF is collaborating with schools in Nigeria and Kenya to develop physical and virtual maker spaces that allow young entrepreneurs to prototype their ideas.

Harry is on the advisory board of the council for Women of West Africa and Entrepreneurship and Promoting Readiness in Science and Math. She is a World Economic Forum Schwab Foundation for Social Entrepreneurship Fellow.
