= Ngozi Iwere =

Nigerian social activist

Ngozi Patricia Iwere
- Born: August 12, 1956 (age 70); Illah, Delta State, Nigeria
- Occupations: Social activist; Community development expert; Journalist
- Known for: Founder and executive director of the Community Life Project; Co-ordinator of the African Feminist Forum, Ashoka Fellow
- Awards: MacArthur Foundation Award for Creative and Effective Institutions (2016)
- Website: Community Life Project

Ngozi Patricia Iwere (born August 12, 1956) is a Nigerian social activist and community development specialist. She founded and directs the Community Life Project (CLP), an organization that advocates for health education and civic engagement, with a focus on HIV/AIDS prevention and women's reproductive health. She also coordinates the African Feminist Forum (AFF), a network of activists, researchers, and practitioners across Africa. She has been an Ashoka Fellow since 1996.

== Early life and education ==
Iwere was born on August 12, 1956, in Illah Delta State, Nigeria. She experienced the Nigerian Civil War and rural poverty during her childhood. She received a National Certificate in Education from the College of Education, Abraka, Delta State, in 1977. She graduated in French from Bayero University, Kano, Nigeria. During her studies, she participated in student activism.

== Career ==
Iwere began her career as a journalist with the African Guardian and Business in Economic Community of West African States (ECOWAS) magazines, where she covered foreign issues and national crises. She also helped establish the feminist organization in Nigeria, Women in Nigeria (WIN), where she served as the national coordinator.

Iwere began working on HIV/AIDS issues in the late 80s and early 90s, during a time when the disease was prevalent in Africa. She identified the need for a comprehensive approach to health issues that included both men and women. This led to the establishment of the Community Life Project (CLP) in 1992, an organization that works with local networks such as hair salon unions, marketplaces, and schools to distribute prevention and treatment information. The CLP and the later established Reclaim Naija Grassroots Movement in 2010 focused on community-based health initiatives, particularly in the areas of HIV/AIDS prevention and women's reproductive health.

Iwere's approach involves engaging with various community sectors and using existing networks to promote health education and prevention. Her work includes organizing focus groups, educational workshops, and events with different community groups. This model addresses HIV/AIDS and other health concerns identified by the community, such as STDs and family planning. Her community-based HIV/AIDS prevention model has been used in reducing stigma and promoting health-seeking behaviors among communities. Her work has contributed to public health in Nigeria.

Iwere coordinates the African Feminist Forum (AFF), a network of activists, researchers, and practitioners from across Africa. The AFF organizes biennial meetings to discuss African feminism. Iwere's role in the AFF involves bringing together diverse voices to discuss women's rights and empowerment in Africa.

== Awards and recognition ==
In 1996, Iwere became an Ashoka Fellow,making her a part of the growing network of African changemakers recognized by Ashoka, including Njideka Harry,Oreoluwa Lesi, Omowumi Ogunrotimi and Princess Olufemi-Kayode. In 2016, she received the MacArthur Foundation Award for Creative and Effective Institutions. Her work has been mentioned in publications and media outlets such as The Guardian, The Nation, and Channels TV.
