= Jawaharlal Nehru Award =

International award presented by Government of India

Jawaharlal Nehru Award for International Understanding
- International civilian award for contributions to the promotion of international understanding, goodwill and friendship among people of the world
- Sponsored by: Government of India
- Reward: ₹ 2.5 million
- First award: 1965

Highlights
- Total awarded: 36
- First winner: U Thant
- Website: http://iccr.gov.in/content/nehru-award-recipients

The Jawaharlal Nehru Award for International Understanding is an international award presented by the Government of India in honour of Jawaharlal Nehru, the country's first prime minister.

== History ==
It was established in 1965 and is administered by the Indian Council for Cultural Relations (ICCR) to people "for their outstanding contribution to the promotion of international understanding, goodwill and friendship among people of the world". The money constituent of this award is 2.5 million rupees.

== Recipients ==
The following people have received this award. No prize was awarded in 1986; between 1995 and 2003; and 2008; the last award was in 2009.

Year	Recipient	Country
1965	U Thant	Burma
1966	Martin Luther King Jr.	United States
1967	Abdul Ghaffar Khan	Pakistan
1968	Yehudi Menuhin	United States
1969	Mother Teresa	India
1970	Kenneth Kaunda	Zambia
1971	Josip Broz Tito	Yugoslavia
1972	André Malraux	France
1973	Julius Nyerere	Tanzania
1974	Raúl Prebisch	Argentina
1975	Jonas Salk	United States
1976	Giuseppe Tucci	Italy
1977	Tulsi Mehar Shrestha	Nepal
1978	Nichidatsu Fujii	Japan
1979	Nelson Mandela	South Africa
1980	Barbara Ward	United Kingdom
1981	Alva Myrdal and Gunnar Myrdal	Sweden
1982	Léopold Sédar Senghor	Senegal
1983	Bruno Kreisky	Austria
1984	Indira Gandhi (posthumous)	India
1985	Olof Palme (posthumous)	Sweden
1987	Javier Pérez de Cuéllar	Peru
1988	Yasser Arafat	Palestine
1989	Robert Mugabe	Zimbabwe
1990	Helmut Kohl	Germany
1991	Aruna Asaf Ali	India
1992	Maurice Strong	Canada
1993	Aung San Suu Kyi	Myanmar
1994	Mahathir Mohamad	Malaysia
1995	Hosni Mubarak	Egypt
2003	Goh Chok Tong	Singapore
2004	Qaboos bin Said	Oman
2005	Wangari Maathai	Kenya
2006	Luiz Inácio Lula da Silva	Brazil
2007	Ólafur Ragnar Grímsson	Iceland
2009	Angela Merkel	Germany
