= Richard Sandbrook =

John Richard Sandbrook
- Born: 13 August 1946; Bath, Somerset
- Died: 11 December 2005 (aged 59)
- Occupation: Activist
- Known for: Co-founder of Friends of the Earth UK

John Richard Sandbrook OBE (13 August 1946 – 11 December 2005) was a co-founder of Friends of the Earth UK serving as Managing Director from 1974 to 1976, and Director of the International Institute for Environment and Development from 1989 to 1999.

Sandbrook was born in Bath, the son of a naval officer. He was educated at Dauntsey's School and the University of East Anglia. He was President of the Union of UEA Students in 1967/8. For five years he was an accountant at Arthur Andersen.

He was a co-founder of Friends of the Earth UK, and served as Managing Director from 1974 to 1976. From 1976 to 1999 he worked at the International Institute for Environment and Development, which pioneered a collaborative way of working with business. Initially he ran its marine programme, in 1983 he became vice-president for policy, in 1986 becoming executive director for Europe, and in 1989 becoming overall executive director until 1999. He was awarded an OBE in the 1990 New Year Honours.

He was a non-executive director of the Eden Project in Cornwall, featuring biomes and gardens, from 1999 to 2003. In 2002 he became involved with a United Nations Development Programme project, Growing Sustainable Business, helping large businesses put capital and expertise to work for the world's poor.

Sandbrook and the former CEO of Thames Water Jeremy Pelczer led in the creation of the charity Water and Sanitation for the Urban Poor in 2005. He was also involved assisting the charities Plantlife and Forum for the Future.

He married Mary Wray in 1970; they had two sons.

Sandbrook died of cancer aged 59.
