= Princess Olufemi-Kayode =

Nigerian criminal justice psychologist

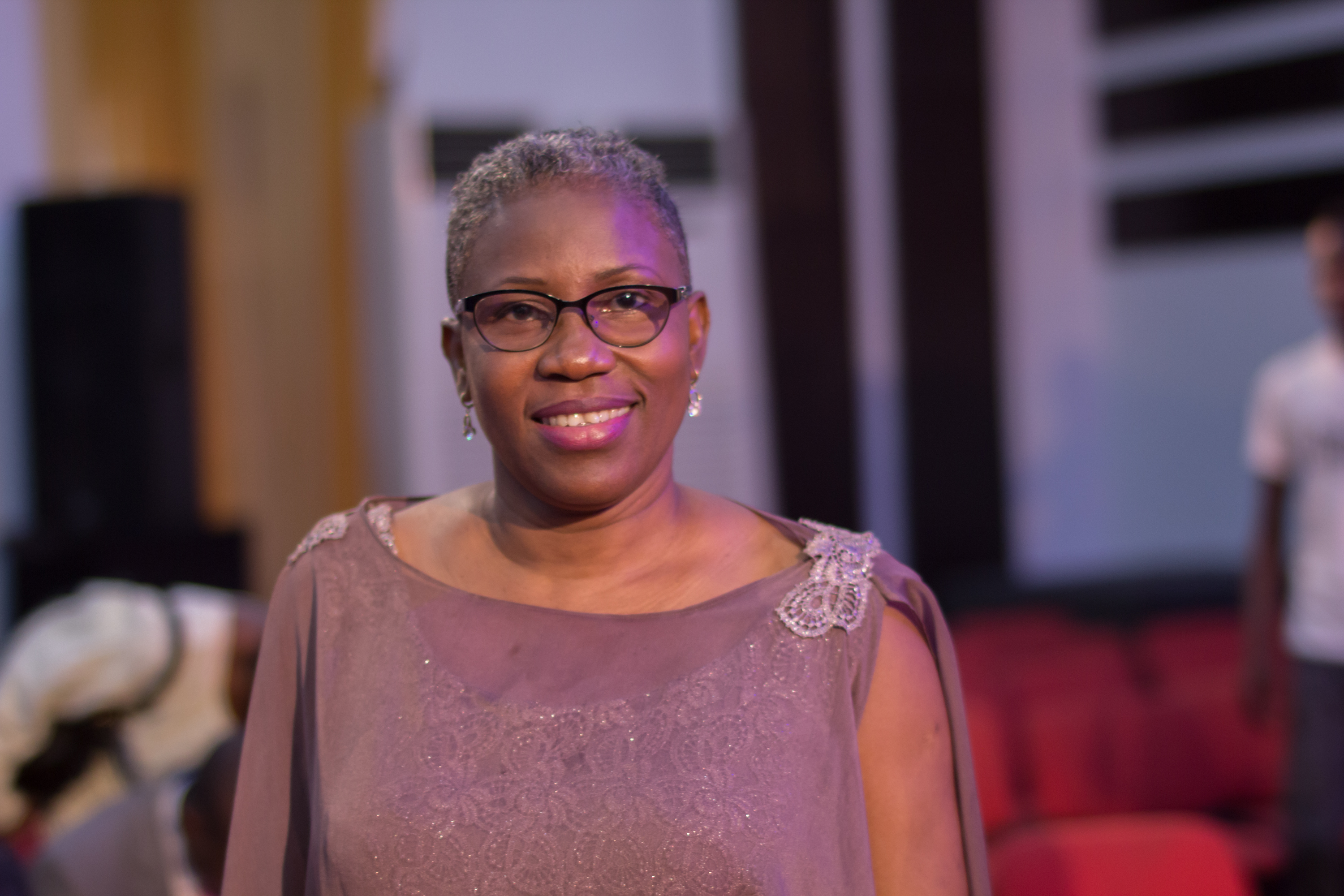
- Born: Nigeria
- Occupations: Criminal justice psychologist; Child rights activist.
- Known for: Child rights activism
- Notable work: She worked as a columnist in The Punch newspaper
- Title: Executive Director

Princess Olufemi-Kayode (also known as Modupe Olufemi-Kayode) is a Nigerian criminal justice psychologist and prominent child rights activist. Olufemi-Kayode became an Ashoka fellow in 2007.

She is the Executive Director of Media Concern for Women and Children Initiative (MEDIACON), a non-profit organisation that provides trauma counseling, legal advocacy, and crisis intervention for child victims of sexual abuse and exploitation. The organization also trains professionals and raises public awareness to prevent abuse and improve support systems.

== Early life and education ==
Princess is a child abuse survivor, who was abused several times by her close associates. In 1979, she wrote two poems about her child abuse experience.

== Career ==
She worked as a columnist in The Punch newspaper, where she managed a column called "Princess Column". She is an international speaker and lover of children. In 2000, she founded Media Concern Initiative for Women and Children, a non-governmental organisation for women and children that focuses in the field of sexual violence prevention and crisis response in Nigeria and Africa. She has appeared in various radio talk shows and television programmes. She became an Ashoka fellow in 2007, making her a part of the growing network of African changemakers recognized by Ashoka, including Njideka Harry,Oreoluwa Lesi, Ngozi Iwere and Omowumi Ogunrotimi. .
