= Environment & Urbanization =

- Discipline: Urban studies, environmental studies
- Language: English
- Edited by: Diana Mitlin, Sheridan Bartlett, David Satterthwaite

Publication details
- History: 1989-present
- Publisher: SAGE Publications
- Frequency: Biannually
- Open access: Delayed, after 2 years
- Impact factor: 3.015 (2018)

Standard abbreviations
- ISO 4: Environ. Urban.

Indexing
- ISSN: 0956-2478 (print); 1746-0301 (web)
- LCCN: 90650014
- OCLC no.: 22223760

Links
- Journal homepage; Online access; Online archive

Environment & Urbanization is a biannual peer-reviewed academic journal covering urban and environmental studies. It is published by SAGE Publications and was established in 1989. Each issue of the journal focuses on a particular theme.

== Abstracting and indexing ==
The journal is abstracted and indexed in:

- Current Contents/Social and Behavioral Science
- GEOBASE
- International Bibliography of the Social Sciences
- Social Sciences Citation Index

According to the Journal Citation Reports, the journal has a 20178 impact factor of 3.015, ranking it seventh among 40 journals in the category "Urban Studies".

== Scope ==
The journal focuses on urban issues in Africa, Asia, and Latin America because these regions have most of the world's urban population. It is available free to teaching or training institutions and non-governmental organizations in low- and middle-income countries. Articles can be submitted in French, Spanish, or Portuguese and, if accepted for publication, are translated into English at the journal's expenses.

To reach a more general public who may not usually read academic journals, a five-page Environment and Urbanization Brief appears with each issue.

== History ==
Environment & Urbanization was established in 1989 by the International Institute for Environment and Development (IIED) to fill a perceived gap in coverage of urban issues in Africa, Asia, and Latin America. It was based on a Spanish-language journal of the same name (Medio Ambiente y Urbanización) that had been set up in 1983 by IIED's sister institution in Argentina, IIED-America Latina. Both journals sought to give more prominence to urban issues, especially those linked to urban poverty. Another related journal, Environment & Urbanization ASIA, was launched in 2010, edited by Om Prakash Mathur and published by SAGE Publications India, in response to the fact that half the world's urban population now lives in Asia.

Environment & Urbanization was first published on the web in 1994 with free access to issues older than two years. SAGE Publications began publishing the journal from 2006. A selection of papers is available in Chinese.
