= Women's Technology Empowerment Centre =

Non-Profit Organization focused on Empowering Female in Technology

- Abbreviation: W.TEC
- Formation: 2008; 18 years ago
- Founder: Oreoluwa Lesi
- Purpose: Technology education for women
- Location: Lagos, Nigeria
- Website: wteconline.org

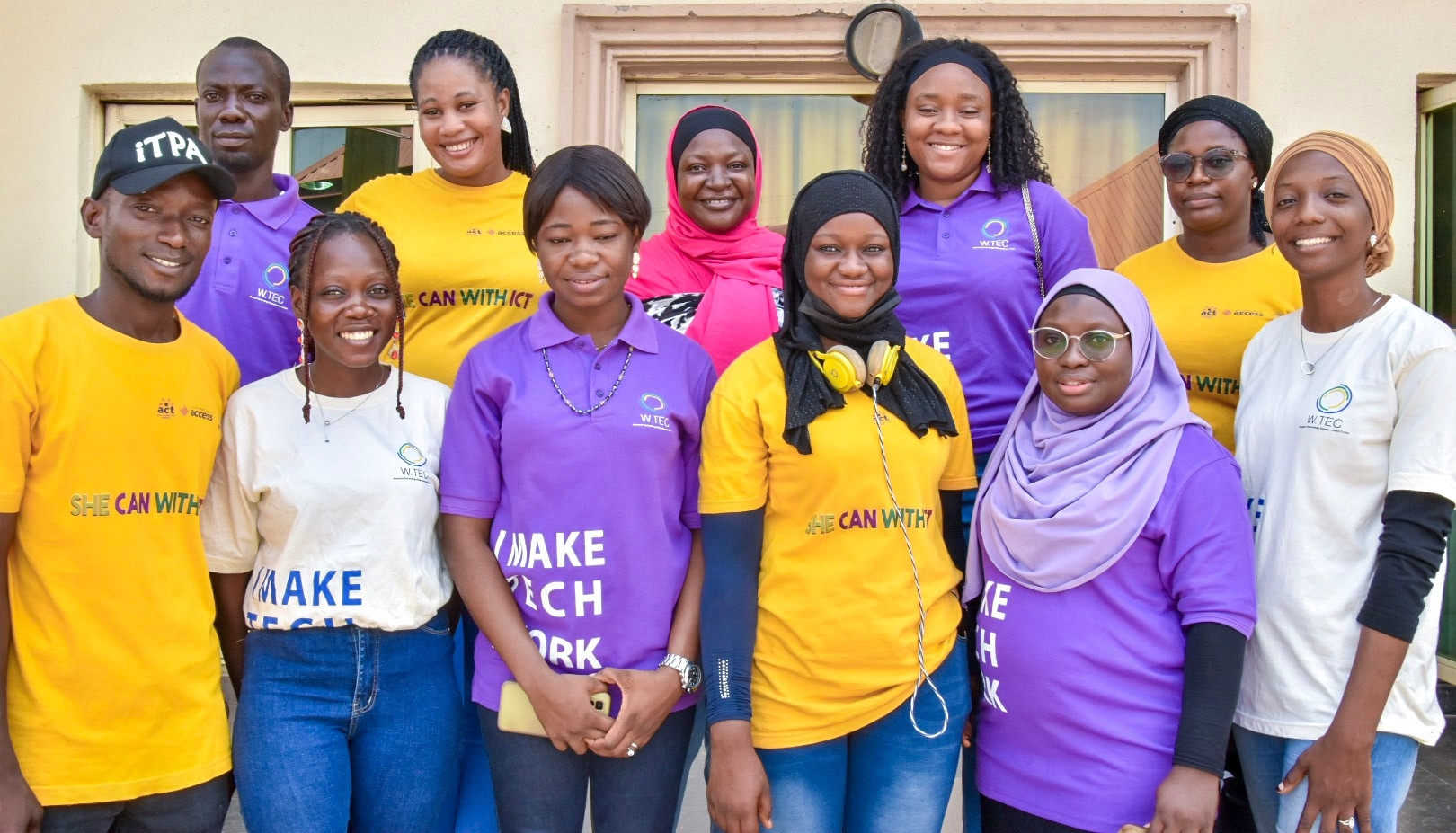
W.TEC Make Her Space Team Kwara during their Graduation Ceremony at Ilorin Kwara State.

The Women's Technology Empowerment Centre (W.TEC) is a non-profit organization that provides technology education for women and girls in Nigeria. W.TEC offers services and programs including mentoring, training, technology camps, awareness campaigns, collaborative projects, and research and publication to empower women.

== History ==
Oreoluwa Lesi noticed a gender gap in the knowledge of Information and communications technology in Nigeria and other African countries. She founded the organization in 2008 in Lagos.

Over the years, W.TEC has extended its scope, reaching over 60,000 participants and expanding into Kwara and Anambra states.

In 2017, Facebook partnered with W.TEC to improve Internet safety.

== Services ==
W.TEC's work includes technology-training programmes for girls through intensive girls-only camps and technology clubs in W.TEC academy. During the camps and after-school clubs, the girls learn to create and innovate with technology by building and making websites, web applications, video games, films, and other digital content. In the words of Adeola Akinyemiju, the Finance Director, W.TEC “is training girls on electronic and digital circuit technologies, web designs to bridge the gender gap in the engineering space." The organisation advocates against and works to break down gender stereotypes, especially with respect to careers. In 2024, the organisation reached out to people with disabilities and provided them with tech training.

Programmes operated by W.TEC include:

- W.TEC Academy: Technology Afterschool Club
- Staying Safe Online: Awareness program on cyber safety techniques and protection from online threat.
- She Creates Camp: Project-based STEAM summer program for secondary school girls.
- Early Innovators: STEAM program designed for young learners on introduction to electronics, coding etc
- MentorHER: Career mentorship program for young women to help strategized their career path
- SHE CAN with ICT and Digipreneur: Capacity building and digital literacy program for female entrepreneurs.
- MAKEHERSPACE: Training initiatives focuses on digital fabrication, electronics and making.
- IT4ALL: STEAM program designed for specially challenged kids
- Making Research for users in women and technological field

== Reception ==
In March 2019, Tim Berners-Lee, the inventor of the World Wide Web, visited W.TEC as part of a worldwide tour in celebration of the 30th anniversary of the Web. During his visit, he spoke about the "Contract for the Web". He later remarked that his audience, largely composed of young girls, had "wonderful energy and creativity". In 2020, Time magazine asked Tim Berners-Lee to write to a young person or group of young people of his own choosing. He chose the girls of W.TEC.

=== Awards ===
- Plan International: Recognition for Supporting Girls in ICT (2009)
- International Telecommunication Union (ITU): Gender Equality Mainstreaming – Technology (GEM-TECH) Award (finalist; Category 5: Closing the ICT Gender Gap; 2014)
- Nigeria Internet Registration Association (NIRA): Presidential Award for Women's Development (2019)
- EQUALS in Tech Awards (Skills Category; 2019)
- ITU: WSIS Prizes Champion (Access to Information and Knowledge Category; 2020)
