= Tulsi Mehar Shrestha =

Nepali activist

Tulsi Mehar Shrestha (Nepali: तुलसी मेहर श्रेष्ठ; 1896–1978) was a Nepali activist and social worker. He has been called the Mahatma Gandhi of Nepal, and was awarded the Jawaharlal Nehru Award by the Government of India in 1977.

He travelled to India, and stayed with Mahatma Gandhi at Sabarmati Ashram for four years. In 1925, he received a letter signed by Gandhi certifying his proficiency in weaving cloth. At the urging of Gandhi, he returned to serve his country. In Nepal, he worked to popularise traditional charkhas and worked for the welfare of dalits and destitute widows. He established Shree Chandra Kamdhenu Charkha Pracharak Mahaguthi, the first social non-governmental organisation in Nepal. He assisted Gandhi's boycott of foreign-made goods by supplying traditional Nepali paper from Nepal. After the establishment of democracy in Nepal, with the support of government, he established another social organisation, Nepal Gandhi Smarak Nidhi, in memory of Gandhi.
