= Nothing but the Truth (2008 South African film) =

- Directed by: John Kani
- Screenplay by: John Kani
- Produced by: Jazz Spirit Production, Odélion Films
- Starring: John Kani, Rosie Motene, Motshabi Tyelele, Warona Seane, Esmeralda Bihl
- Cinematography: Jimmy Rob, Marius Va Graan
- Edited by: Megan Gil, Jackie Le Cordeur
- Music by: Neil Solomon
- Release date: July 2008 (Durban)
- Running time: 81 minutes
- Country: South Africa

Nothing but the Truth is a 2008 film. The movie is adapted from a widely popular one-man show performed by actor and director John Kani.

The film premiered at the 2008 Durban International Film Festival.

== Synopsis ==
In New Brighton, South Africa, 63-year-old librarian Sipho Makhaya is getting ready to receive the body of his brother Themba, recently deceased while in exile in London and a hero of the Anti-Apartheid Movement. Nothing but the Truth investigates the contrast between those blacks who remained in South Africa and risked their lives to lead the fight against apartheid and those who returned victoriously after living in exile.

== Awards ==
- Écrans Noirs (Yaundé) 2009
- Fespaco (Uagadugú) 2009
- Festival de Cine de Harare 2009
