= Priscilla Ikos Usiobaifo =

Nigerian feminist and gender rights advocate

- Citizenship: Nigerian
- Education: B.Sc. Political Science; National Diploma Public Administration
- Occupation: Gender rights advocate
- Known for: Gender Justice Advocacy
- Awards: U.S. Mission Nigeria Woman of Courage Award 2024
- Website: www.braveheartinitiative.org

Priscilla Ikos Usiobaifo is a Nigerian feminist, women and gender rights advocate whose work focused on gender-based violence and gender justice in Nigeria. In 2021, she was named among Apolitical's 100 Most Influential People in Gender Policy along Stella Nyanzi and Fatima Denton. In 2024, she received the U.S. Mission Nigeria Woman of Courage Award.

== Education ==
Usiobaifo holds a Bachelor of Science degree in Political Science and a National Diploma in Public Administration.

== Career ==
Usiobaifo is the executive director of the BraveHeart Initiative (BHI), a non-governmental organisation based in Edo State. She founded the organisation in Igarra in 2002 as a youth development club. It was later registered as a non-governmental organisation working on sexual and reproductive health and rights (SRHR) and the prevention of sexual and gender-based violence (SGBV) in rural communities.

In 2021, Apolitical listed Usiobaifo among its 100 Most Influential People in Gender Policy, specifically in the Bodily Autonomy and Sexual and Reproductive Health and Rights (SRHR) category. During the 16 Days of Activism in 2022, she appeared alongside Omowumi Ogunrotimi in a public discussion on activism to end violence against women and girls. In 2025, Usiobaifo participated in Ford Foundation West Africa events held during CSW69 in celebration of the 30th anniversary of the Beijing Declaration and Platform for Action.

== Awards and recognition ==
- 2019 – Yemisi Ransome Kuti (YRK) Leadership Award
- 2020 – Orange Champion, U.S. Embassy Nigeria
- 2020 – Beijing Eaglet, UN Women Nigeria
- 2021 – Federal Ministry of Women Affairs recognition for grassroots child protection and women's rights work
- 2024 – U.S. Mission Nigeria Woman of Courage Award
- 2025 – Empowerment Champion Award
