= Hoesung Lee =

South Korean economist (born 1945)

- 이회성
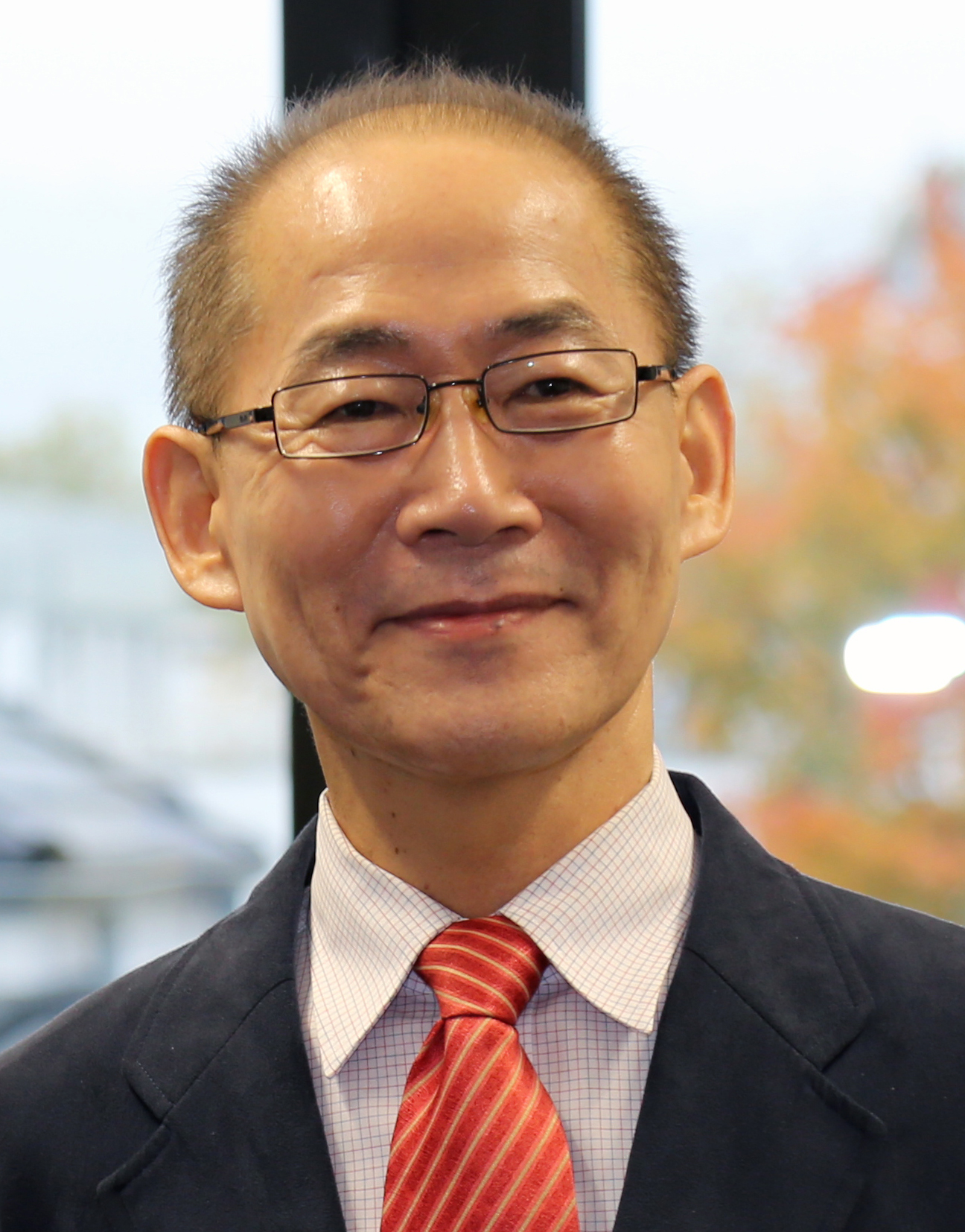
- Born: December 31, 1945 (age 80); Yesan County, United States Army Military Government in Korea
- Education: Seoul National University (B.A.); Rutgers University (Ph.D)
- Children: 2
- Scientific career
- Fields: Economics
- Workplaces: Korea University
- Website: Hoesung Lee

- Hoesung Lee
- Hangul: 이회성
- Hanja: 李會晟
- RR: I Hoeseong
- MR: I Hoesŏng

Hoesung Lee (Korean: 이회성; born December 31, 1945) is a South Korean economist who served as the chair of the Intergovernmental Panel on Climate Change (IPCC) from 2015 to 2023. He is professor in the economics of climate change, energy and sustainable development in the Graduate School of Energy, Environment, Policy & Technology at Korea University.

== Early life and education ==
Lee was born in Yesan County on December 31, 1945. One of his elder brothers is politician Lee Hoi-chang, a former Prime Minister of South Korea and a three-time presidential candidate. Lee received his B.A. in economics from Seoul National University in 1969 and a Ph.D. in economics from Rutgers University in 1975.

== Career ==
Lee began his career as an economist working for ExxonMobil. In 1986, he became the first head of the Korea Energy Economics Institute, and beginning in 1988 led the Korean Resource Economics Association.

=== Intergovernmental Panel on Climate Change ===
Lee joined the IPCC in 1992, and formerly served as the panel's vice chair. Lee was elected as the chair of the Intergovernmental Panel on Climate Change (IPCC) on October 6, 2015. Lee succeeded former chair Rajendra K. Pachauri, who had resigned in February 2015.

In his opening statement as chair of the Intergovernmental Panel on Climate Change (IPCC) at the 48th Session held in Incheon, Korea in October 2018, he described this IPCC meeting as "one of the most important" in its history. The landmark Special Report on Global Warming of 1.5 °C (SR15) was released at the meeting on October 8, 2018. The highlight of his term as chair, he said in an interview, was personally witnessing numerous world leaders declare their goal of net-zero emissions by mid-century, based on the IPCC reports.

== Personal life and recognition ==
Lee has two children. In 2015, The Guardian reported that he has a reputation as a "private, quiet person who listens and gives everyone a chance to speak during meetings".

In 2016, he became a laureate of the Asian Scientist 100 by the Asian Scientist. Lee was named one of Time magazine's 100 Most Influential People of 2019.

Political offices
Preceded by Rajendra K. Pachauri	Chairman of the IPCC; 2015–2023	Succeeded by James Skea
