= Stella Nyanzi =

Ugandan anthropologist, human rights activist, politician, and poet

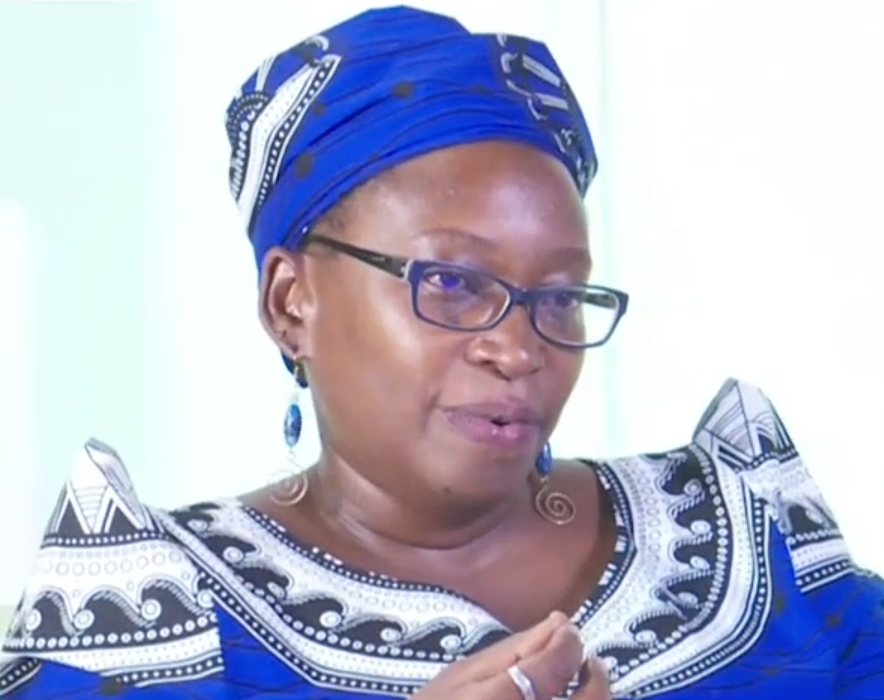
- Born: 16 June 1974 (age 52); Jinja, Jinja Hospital, Uganda
- Other names: Nnalongo Owenene, Nnalongo (Mother of twins)
- Citizenship: Uganda
- Education: Makerere University (Bachelor of Arts in Mass Communication and Literature); University College London (Masters in Science, Medical Anthropology); London School of Hygiene and Tropical Medicine (PhD in Social anthropology)
- Occupations: Scholar, anthropologist, human rights activist
- Years active: 1997— present

Stella Nyanzi (born 16 June 1974) is a Ugandan human rights advocate, poet, medical anthropologist, feminist, queer rights advocate, and scholar of sexuality, family planning, and public health. In 2017, she was arrested for insulting the Ugandan president, Yoweri Museveni.

In 2021, Nyanzi was named among Apolitical’s 100 Most Influential People in Gender Policy along Priscilla Ikos Usiobaifo and Fatima Denton. Also, in January 2022, she was accepted to live in Germany on a writers-in-exile programme run by PEN Germany, with her three children.

== Education ==
Nyanzi received her Bachelor of Arts in Mass Communication and Literature at Makerere University where she studied from 1993 to 1996. She received her Master of Science in Medical Anthropology at University College London, where she studied from 1999 to 2000. She received her PhD in anthropology at the London School of Hygiene and Tropical Medicine, where she studied social anthropology, sexuality, and youth and health policy from 2003 to 2008.

Nyanzi has conducted research on youth sexuality in Uganda, and also in The Gambia in 2005.

== Career ==
Nyanzi began her career in 1997 as a social science research associate at the Medical Research Council (UK) Programme in Uganda, where she worked until September 2002. She then received a new position working as Local Anthropologist at the Medical Research Council Laboratories, The Gambia, where she worked for one year. She left that position to pursue her PhD in London.

In 2009, Nyanzi began at Makerere University as a Researcher at the Law, Gender & Sexuality Research Project, as a member of the Faculty of Law, where she worked until December 2013. She then worked as a Research Fellow at the Makerere Institute of Social Research until 2016. While there, she was asked to lecture in the new PhD programme called the Mamdani PHD Project, but declined. Her office was closed and, in an example of the West African feminist cultural practice of what the scholar Naminata Diabate has called "naked agency," made a nude protest against her boss.

After her arrest in 2017, Nyanzi was suspended from Makerere University. She appealed the decision with Makerere University's appeal tribunal, which directed that she be reinstated, promoted to the level of a research fellow with immediate effect, and paid back wages. The university refused to abide by its tribunal's decision. So, she filed a lawsuit against the university requesting reinstatement and back wages. In response, in December 2018, the university dismissed her, along with 45 other academics, arguing that her contract expired.

Nyanzi has also done consulting work for various social research organizations outside of Uganda and The Gambia.

== Research ==
Nyanzi is a well-cited scholar in her fields, with 61 articles and 2,049 citations by May 2022. Among her most cited articles are those on Ugandan youth's negotiations of sexual relationships, attitudes towards HIV testing among pregnant Ugandan women, Ugandan women's control over sexual encounters, Ugandan men's attitudes towards contraceptive use, and the sexual behaviour of many groups. She is also one of the first scholars to publish research on African homosexuality.

== Activism ==
Nyanzi practices what scholars have called "radical rudeness," which is a traditional Ugandan strategy of calling the powerful to account through public insult. It was developed during the colonial era, as "a rude, publicly celebrated strategy of insults, scandal mongering, disruption, and disorderliness that broke conventions of colonial friendship, partnership, and mutual benefit."

Nyanzi has campaigned for the rights of Ugandan women, youth, and LGBTQIA+ people.

On 6 March 2017, Nyanzi launched the Pads4girlsUg Project, due to her concerns about girls missing school because they could not afford menstrual products. She collected thousands of re-usable pads and distributed them to school girls and also offered lectures to school children about menstrual health.

== Arrest ==
In March 2017, Nyanzi referred to President Museveni as "a pair of buttocks."

On 7 April 2017, Nyanzi was arrested and detained by police at Kiira Police Station on charges of cyber harassment and offensive communication. On 10 April 2017, she was thereafter produced in court, where she was charged with the misuse of a computer, cyber harassment, and abusing the president under section 24, and 25 of the Computer Misuse Act of 2011. She was then remanded to Luzira Prison. On 11 April 2017, doctors from Butabika Hospital were asked to carry out a psychiatric assessment examination to determine whether she was insane, as the government prosecutor was alleging. However, she resisted the examination and requested that her personal doctor and at least one family member should be present if they want to carry out a medical test on her.

On 10 May 2017, Nyanzi was released on a USh 10,000,000/= (US$2904) non cash bail. In October 2018, she was remanded to prison. She did not request bail because she believed she was safer in jail and because she wanted to continue her education work with the women in prison. In December 2018, her lawyer attacked the charges as unlawful.

In January 2019, Nyanzi asked that her court date be delayed as she was ill and had suffered a miscarriage in prison. On August 2, 2019, she exposed her breasts in protest at a sentencing.

=== 2020 cyber harassment case and release ===
In 2020, Nyanzi successfully appealed her conviction for cyber harassment against President Yoweri Museveni. Nyanzi gained prominence for her outspoken criticism of the Ugandan government and her use of social media to challenge policies and leadership through satire and graphic language.

On 16 September 2018, Nyanzi posted a poem on Facebook that mocked President Museveni and his late mother, leading to charges of cyber harassment and offensive communication under Uganda’s Computer Misuse Act, 2011. The poem controversially suggested that Uganda would have been better off if Museveni had not been born. In August 2019, a magistrate court convicted Nyanzi of cyber harassment and sentenced her to 18 months in prison, while clearing her of offensive communication. She had been detained since November 2018.

Nyanzi appealed her conviction on grounds that the lower court acted without jurisdiction and denied her a fair trial. The High Court, presided over by Justice Henry Peter Adonyo, quashed her conviction, citing procedural errors, failure to allow adequate time to summon witnesses, and insufficient evidence to prove cyber harassment, including uncertainty over whether she used a computer or was in Uganda when posting the poem .

Her release from custody on 20 February 2020 was marked by chaotic scenes outside the court, including clashes between supporters and prison officials, with gunshots fired in the air, though no injuries were reported. Prison authorities noted that, procedurally, Nyanzi had to return briefly to prison to complete formalities before her full release.

== Reputation and reception ==
News report discussing Nyanzi's remand to Luzira prison for insulting President Museveni’s mother.

The international press has called her "one of Africa's most prominent gender rights activists," "a leading scholar in the emerging field of African queer studies," and a leader in the fight against "repressive anti-queer laws" and for "freedom of speech." Her scholarship has provided "insight into the effects of patriarchy, misogyny and homophobia in Uganda, The Gambia, and Tanzania." Some consider her arrest as having more to do with her status as a gay ally than other factors. An international outcry followed Stella Nyanzi's arrest, with human rights groups condemning the act as a violation of academic freedom and freedom of expression. Amnesty International called for Uganda to drop the "absurd charges" against her. Pen International, the writer's organization, also condemned her arrest. Human Rights Watch condemned her arrest as "an indicator that those who express critical views of the Ugandan government, especially the first family, can face its wrath."

International news agencies have reported on the reasons for her arrest as political. NPR reported that her arrest was for giving hope "that the powerless can take on the powerful." The Washington Post reported that her arrest was for being an "outspoken anti-Museveni activist." Al Jazeera English reported that her arrest was due to Museveni's plans to rule for life and his intolerance of critics. The Canadian Globe and Mail reported that her arrest was "at the heart of it all it [about] her imaginative use of language and her fierce defiance of the perceived limits for Ugandan women." The Guardian reported that her "attack on her government’s refusal to fund sanitary wear for girls led to a successful crowdfunding campaign, and prison."

In Uganda, she has a large number of supporters, with the largest social media following of any Ugandan. Many collected food for her in prison. Ugandan scholars have praised her as standing up against "our tormentors." Her lawyer Isaac Kimaze Semakadde was named "most outstanding public interest litigation lawyer in Uganda" by the Uganda Law Society, in part for his work on this case.

In Uganda, "strong cultural taboos against talking openly and graphically about sex and sexuality" exist and "homosexuality is illegal and sex education is banned in schools." However, Nyanzi speaks "openly - and colourfully - about sex, genitalia and politics. For this, she is adored by many of her fellow citizens but viewed with distaste by some of Uganda's more conservative elements."

Nyanzi was the subject of the 2026 film The Woman who Poked the Leopard directed by Ugandan filmmaker Patience Nitumwesiga. The film follows Nyanzi and her family through her imprisonment and election to her eventual exile to Germany. The film has screened at the One World International Human Rights Film Festival, the International Documentary Film Festival Amsterdam and Hot Docs Festival in Toronto.

== Exile ==
On 30 January 2021, Nyanzi arrived in Nairobi, Kenya by bus, and through her lawyer, Professor George Luchiri Wajackoyah, sought asylum in Kenya, on account of political persecution by the Museveni-led government in Uganda. In January 2022, she was accepted to live in Germany on a writers-in-exile programme run by PEN Germany, with her three children. While she appreciated the freedom and protection against threats and persecution in Uganda, she wants to return one day, to contribute towards creating a future Uganda after the Museveni era.

== See also ==
- Education in Uganda
- LGBT Rights in Uganda
- Lwengo District
- Mahmood Mamdani
- Sarah Ssali
