= Panmao Zhai =

Chinese climatologist

Panmao Zhai is a Chinese climatologist, Secretary General of the Chinese Meteorological Society, and one of six co-chair of the Intergovernmental Panel on Climate Change working groups.

== Early life and education ==
Zhai received his bachelor's degree in climatology from Nanjing University in 1984, and a master's degree in physical climatology, also from Nanjing University, in 1990.

== Career and impact ==
Zhai is a professor at the Chinese Academy of Meteorological Sciences. He was previously Director-General of Department of Forecasting and Networking in China Meteorological Administration and the Vice President of Chinese Academy of Meteorological Sciences. He is now the Secretary General of the Chinese Meteorological Society.

=== Intergovernmental Panel on Climate Change ===
Zhai was a contributing author to the IPCC fourth assessment, and Lead Author of working group I for the IPCC fifth assessment (2008-2015). He was elected as co-chair of the IPCC working group 1 for the sixth assessment.

== Selected works ==
- Zhai, P., Zhang, X., Wan, H., & Pan, X. (2005). Trends in total precipitation and frequency of daily precipitation extremes over China. Journal of climate, 18(7), 1096-1108.
- Zhai, P., Sun, A., Ren, F., Liu, X., Gao, B., & Zhang, Q. (1999). Changes of climate extremes in China. In Weather and Climate extremes (pp. 203–218). Springer, Dordrecht.
