= African Climate Policy Centre =

African Climate Policy Centre (ACPC) was established as an important aspect of knowledge generation on climate change in Africa for the Climate for Development (ClimDev) Africa Programme. ACPC has two overall aims; contributing to poverty alleviation through efficient mitigation and adaptation to climate change in Africa and improving the capacity of African countries to be able effectively take part in multilateral climate negotiations.

== History ==
ACPC was established in 2010 along with a 10-year visionary programme, Climate for Development in Africa, with support from the African Union Commission (AUC), the United Nations Economic Commission for Africa (ECA), and the African Development Bank (AfDB). In 2011, Climate Development in Africa started the first phase of operation with ACPC as its secretariat. The first phase lasted for six years (2011–2016) and with reference to the progress achieved during the first phase, ACPC developed a new way of guiding the activities for the next seven years in 2017.

== ACPC objectives ==
The objectives of ACPC are;

1. Strengthening the capacity of African countries to participate in global climate governance;
2. Enhancing the capacity of African countries to develop coherent policy frameworks for coordinating adaptation and mitigation investment in climate information and knowledge generated at all levels;
3. Improving the capacity of African countries to mainstream climate concerns into development frameworks;
4. Ensuring a solid foundation of applied climate science and assessment of climate vulnerability, risks and impacts and
5. Identifying sectoral priorities and responses for managing climate risks and guiding related investments.

== Activity areas ==
The activities of the organisation is divided into three;

1. Knowledge generation, sharing and networking
2. Advocacy and consensus building
3. Advisory Services and Technical Cooperation
