= James Skea =

British academic (born 1953)

Sir Jim Skea
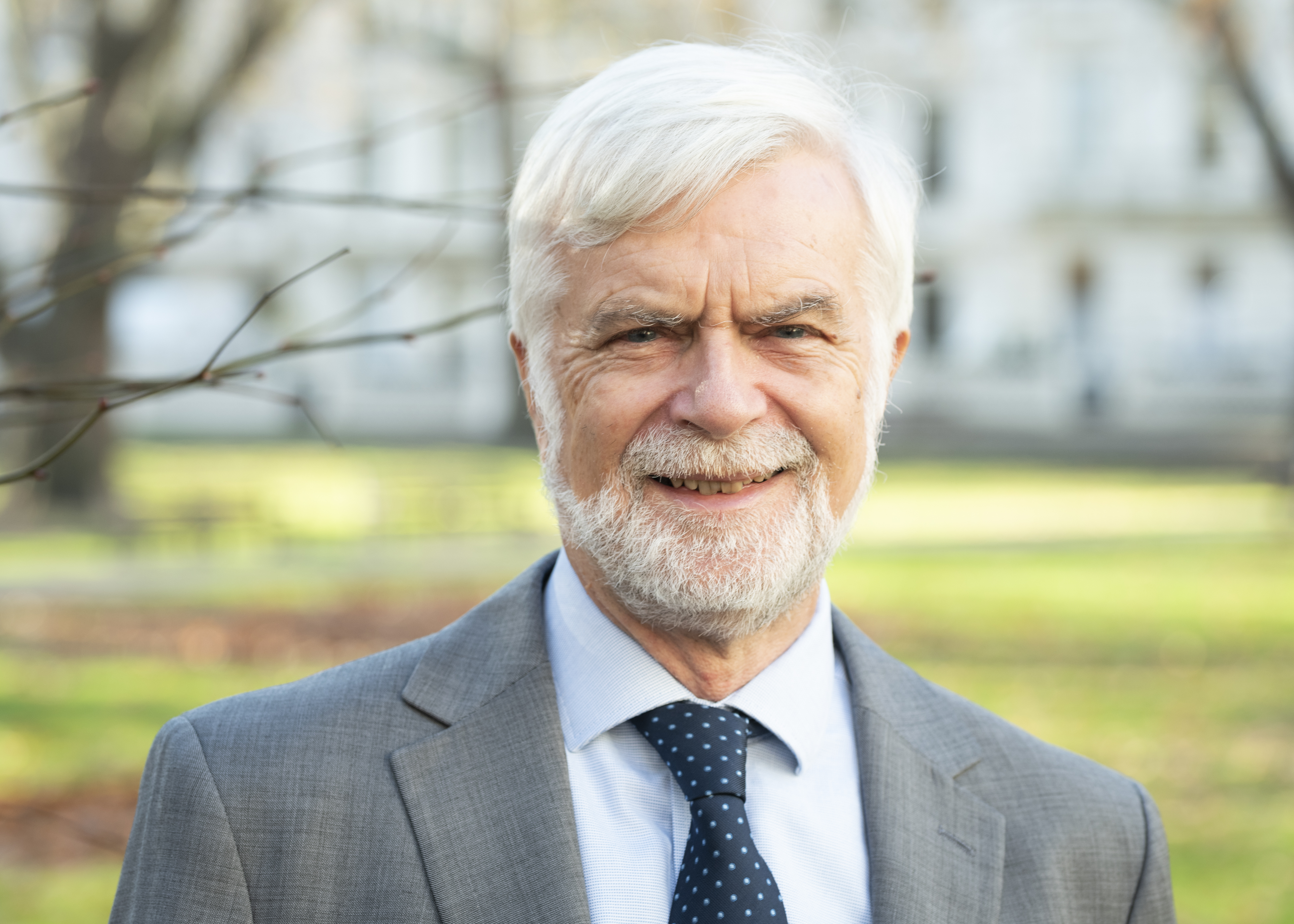
- Born: James Ferguson Skea; 1 September 1953 (age 73); Dundee, Scotland, UK
- Occupations: Professor, scientist

Academic background
- Education: University of Edinburgh (BSc); Clare College, Cambridge (PhD)

Sir James Ferguson "Jim" Skea CBE FRSE (/skiː/ sk-EE; born 1 September 1953) is a British academic. He is currently Chair of the Intergovernmental Panel on Climate Change (IPCC) for its seventh assessment cycle, and a Professor of Sustainable Energy at Imperial College London. Before being elected as chair, Skea was co-chair of Working Group III of the IPCC. He was a founding member of the UK Government's Committee on Climate Change and currently chairs Scotland's Just Transition Commission. He was a co-author of the IPCC 2018 Special Report on Global Warming of 1.5 °C. In July 2023, Skea was elected as Chair of the IPCC.

== Education ==
Skea studied at the University of Edinburgh, where he graduated with a BSc degree in Mathematical Physics with first-class honours in 1975. He gained his PhD degree in Energy Research from Clare College, Cambridge, in 1978.

== Academic career ==
From 1978 to 1981, Skea was a research assistant in the Cavendish Laboratory at the University of Cambridge. He then worked at the Department of Engineering and Public Policy at Carnegie-Mellon University in Pittsburgh, Pennsylvania, as a research associate and later visiting assistant professor from 1981 to 1983. He was employed at the Science Policy Research Unit at the University of Sussex as a Research Fellow (1983–1989), Senior Research Fellow (1989–1993) and a Professorial Fellow (1994–1998). Skea was Director of the Policy Studies Institute from 1998 to 2004. He has held an appointment as Professor of Sustainable Energy at Imperial College London's Centre for Environmental Policy since 2009.

== Intergovernmental Panel on Climate Change ==
Skea was elected as Chair of the Intergovernmental Panel on Climate Change (IPCC) on 26 July 2023. He has been involved with the IPCC since it was created in the 1990s. He has served as a member of the Bureau since 2008, first as vice-chair of Working Group III, and then as co-chair from 2015. He was a co-author of the 2018 Special Report on Global Warming of 1.5 °C, 2019 Special Report on Climate Change and Land and the 2022 report on the Mitigation of Climate Change.

During his time as IPCC Chair, Skea is being hosted by the International Institute for Environment and Development (IIED).

== Scientific appointments ==
Skea was appointed as Director of the Economic and Social Research Council's Global Environmental Change Programme from 1995 to 1998. He was Research Director at the UK Energy Research Centre from 2004 to 2012. Skea was a member of the United Kingdom's Committee on Climate Change from its inception in 2008 until 2018. From 2012 to 2017 he was the Research Councils UK Energy Strategy Fellow based at Imperial College London. Skea was President of the Energy Institute from 2015 to 2017 and has been an Engineering and Physical Sciences Research Council Senior Fellow since 2017.

== Honours and awards ==
- Fellow of the Royal Society of Arts, 2000
- Officer of the Order of the British Empire, 2004
- Fellow of the Energy Institute, 2005
- Certificate of Commendation, Japan, 2009, for work as co-chair of Japan-UK Joint Research Project "Roadmap to a Low-Carbon World"
- Honorary Fellow of the Society for the Environment, 2011
- Melchett Award of the Energy Institute, 2010
- Commander of the Order of the British Empire, 2013
- Knight Bachelor, 2024

== Selected publications ==
- Diemen R van; Skea J; Hannon M; Gazis E; Rhodes A (2019). Energy Innovation for the Twenty-First Century: Accelerating the Energy Revolution. Edward Elgar. ISBN 978-1-78811-261-1.
- Ekins P; Skea J; Winskel M (2011). Energy 2050: the transition to a secure low carbon energy system for the UK. Earthscan. ISBN 978-1138968790.
- Sorrell S; Skea J (1998). Pollution for Sale: Emissions Trading and Joint Implementation. Edward Elgar. ISBN 9781840640106.
- Howes R; Skea J; Whelan B (1997). Clean and Competitive? Motivating Environmental Performance in Industry. Earthscan. ISBN 1-85383-491-2.
- Hawkins R; Skea J; Mansell R (1995). Standards, Innovation and Competitiveness: The Politics and Economics of Standards in Natural and Technical Environments. Edward Elgar. ISBN 9781858980379.
- Boehmer-Christiansen SA; Skea J (1991). Acid Politics: Environmental and Energy Policies in Britain and Germany. Belhaven Press. ISBN 1852933178.

== Notes ==
Political offices
Preceded by Hoesung Lee	Chair of the IPCC; 2023–	Succeeded by Incumbent
