= International Institute for Environment and Development =

Not-for-profit environmentalist organization

International Institute for Environment and Development (IIED)
- Founded: 1973; 53 years ago
- Founder: Barbara Ward
- Type: Registered charity
- Purpose: Sustainable development
- Headquarters: London and Edinburgh
- Location: London, United Kingdom
- Region served: World wide
- Method: Research, policy, advocacy
- Executive director: Tom Mitchell
- Key people: Tom Mitchell, David Satterthwaite, Lorenzo Cotula
- Website: www.iied.org

The International Institute for Environment and Development (IIED) is an independent policy research institute (think tank) whose stated mission is to "build a fairer, more sustainable world, using evidence, action and influence in partnership with others." Its director is Dr Tom Mitchell.

IIED is one of a small group of independent, not-for-profit organisations that has provided core concepts and methods for thinking about sustainability and social change. IIED's main way of working is through partnership with like-minded organisations in Africa, Asia and Latin America. The institute's work is currently divided into four main areas: natural resources, climate change, human settlements and sustainable markets.

IIED is based in central London near Chancery Lane and has an office in Edinburgh. It formerly had offices in Dakar, Senegal (now an independent organisation IED-Afrique) and Buenos Aires, Argentina (also now an independent organisation, IIED-America Latina). There was also an office in Washington DC, USA (until IIED North America merged with the World Resources Institute in 1988).

The International Institute of Environment and Development has more than 170 employees and researchers from dozens of countries. The organisation's board of trustees are all volunteers, currently 13 representatives from 10 countries. The working budget of the IIED, £26.1 million in 2023/24, is achieved through donations, grants and mutually beneficial partnerships.

== History ==
=== 1970s ===
The origins of IIED can be found in the International Institute for Environmental Affairs (IIEA), which was set up in New York in 1971 with backing from industrialist Robert O. Anderson and New York Times journalist Jack Raymond as founding president. In 1973, Barbara Ward was asked to become the organisation's first director, and agreed on the condition that development as well as an environmental agenda was integral to its mission. She moved the organisation to London and changed its name to IIED.

IIEA had helped shape the agenda for the 1972 United Nations Conference on the Human Environment (also known as the Stockholm Conference), which led to the creation of the United Nations Environment Programme (UNEP). Ward's book Only One Earth (co-authored with René Dubos), was the key text for delegates at that conference, where Ward introduced the term sustainable development to a global audience and highlighted the links between the environment and human wellbeing.

IIED carried out research and lobbying work on a range of contemporary environment and development topics, using funds obtained from donor organisations and occasionally from corporations and foundations. It held its first symposium at the 1974 UN World Food Conference and in 1975 joined forces with UNEP to create Earthscan, an information and environment service for media. In 1976 it was heavily involved in HABITAT, the first UN Conference on Human Settlements.

=== 1980s ===
In 1985, IIED and the World Resources Institute (WRI) began to produce the biennial World Resources Report, which today is solely a WRI publication. In 1987, the Brundtland Report, also known as Our Common Future, cited IIED's contribution to creating "a global agenda for change".

The institute's staff published a series of landmark books, including Africa in Crisis by Lloyd Timberlake (1986), The Greening of Africa by Paul Harrison (1987), and No Timber Without Trees by Duncan Poore (1989) and Squatter Citizen: Life in the Urban Third World by Jorge Hardoy and David Satterthwaite (1989).

=== 1990s ===
IIED played an important role ahead of the 1992 United Nations Conference on Environment and Development, or Earth Summit, held in Rio de Janeiro, Brazil, by mobilising civil society and drawing international attention to the summit. For this, IIED was awarded the Blue Planet Prize. One of IIED's major projects of the 1990s was called "Towards a Sustainable Paper Cycle".

=== 2000s ===
In 2001, IIED set up a climate change programme, led by Dr Saleemul Huq. He and several other IIED researchers have served as lead authors or coordinating lead authors for the Intergovernmental Panel on Climate Change. IIED was active at Rio Earth Summit's follow-up conference, the World Summit on Sustainable Development in Johannesburg in 2002. Between 2000 and 2002, IIED led the Mining, Minerals and Sustainable Development (MMSD) project, a global review of the impacts and practices of the mining sector that engaged industry players and recommended improvements to their operations. In October 2008, the Independent newspaper cited then IIED director Camilla Toulmin as one of Britain's top 100 environmentalists.

=== 2010s ===
In 2012, IIED organised a major conference ahead of the Rio+20 Summit in Brazil.

== Current work ==
IIED continues to both conduct research with partners in dozens of countries and act on a global stage through processes such as various multilateral environmental negotiations.

== Directors ==
IIED's founding director Barbara Ward died in 1981. She was succeeded by William Clark, Brian Walker, Richard Sandbrook, Nigel Cross, Camilla Toulmin, Andrew Norton and, currently, Tom Mitchell, who took over in September 2022.

== Intergovernmental Panel on Climate Change ==
In 2023 British academic Jim Skea was elected as Chair of the Intergovernmental Panel on Climate Change (IPCC). He has been involved with the IPCC since it was created in the 1990s and, during his time as chair, Skea has chosen to be hosted by IIED.

== Publications ==
IIED publishes a variety of reports, working papers, books, policy briefs and opinion papers, most of which are free to download as pdfs from its website. Its online presence has expanded to include social media applications in recent years.

Its long-standing series include the international journal Environment and Urbanization and Gatekeeper, along with three discontinued series: Participatory Learning and Action (dealing with participatory research), Haramata (dealing with drylands development issues) and Tiempo (dealing with climate change impacts, long before interest was widespread).

IIED's Earthscan Publications imprint was run from 1987 by Neil Middleton, until it moved to Kogan Page, later to be acquired by James & James, and in 2011 being taken over by Taylor and Francis. Earthscan has published many of IIED's books.

== Barbara Ward Lectures ==
IIED organises the "Barbara Ward Lectures" in memory of the institute's first director, who died in 1981. Previous speakers have included:

- Former President of Ireland Mary Robinson in 2006
- Lindiwe Sisulu, Minister of Housing of the Republic of South Africa
- Connie Hedegaard, European Commissioner for Climate Action
- Christiana Figueres in 2012, executive secretary of the UN Framework Convention on Climate Change
- Fatima Denton, in 2014} director of the Special Initiatives Division and leader of the African Climate Policy Centre of the UN Economic Commission for Africa (UNECA)
- Debra Roberts, in 2016, head of the Sustainable and Resilient City Initiatives portfolio in eThekwini Municipality, Durban, South Africa
- Former Prime Minister of Norway and Director-General of the World Health Organization Gro Harlem Brundtland
- Rebeca Grynspan, secretary-general of the UN Conference on Trade and Development (UNCTAD), and
- Mafalda Duarte, executive director of the Green Climate Fund.

== Impact ==
IIED is generally acknowledged to be a successful organisation – its ideas are pragmatic and pro-poor, and it has helped to influence major organisations, including the World Bank, the Intergovernmental Panel on Climate Change, the Millennium Ecosystem Assessment, the Department for International Development of the UK government, and Scandinavian aid agencies such as SIDA and DANIDA.

For example, a former staff member, Gordon Conway, was partly responsible with Robert Chambers for developing participatory rural appraisal, a suite of largely visual techniques widely used in international and community development to elicit public views and ideas. IIED's Environmental Economics programme helped to develop some of the first "green accounting" and eco-taxation techniques that are now used in government and industry. Richard Sandbrook lobbied some of the world's largest corporations to improve their environmental performance – notably in the mining sector.

== Funders ==
IIED lists its sources of financial support on an annual basis.

- Governments and government agencies

Including: AusAid, GTZ, DFID, Defra, the Dutch Ministry of Foreign Affairs, IrishAid, the Norwegian Agency for Development Cooperation, Royal Danish Ministry of Foreign Affairs, Swedish International Development Cooperation Agency, Swiss Agency for Development and Cooperation.

- International and multilateral agencies

Including: African Development Bank, European Commission, European Parliament, World Bank

- Foundations and NGOs

Including: African Centre for Technology Studies, Bill and Melinda Gates Foundation, Comic Relief, Ford Foundation, Hivos, Oxfam UK, WWF UK

- Corporate

Including: The Cooperative, Indufor Oy, Price Waterhouse Coopers Service, The Policy Practice. Work on Mining, Minerals and Sustainable Development in the 2000s was operated separately from IIED offices to avoid corporate influence.
