= Barbara Ward =

Barbara Ward is an American politician. She was elected to the New Hampshire House of Representatives in 2026.
