= Alfred Thomas Grove =

British geographer and climatologist (1924–2023)

Alfred Thomas (Dick) Grove
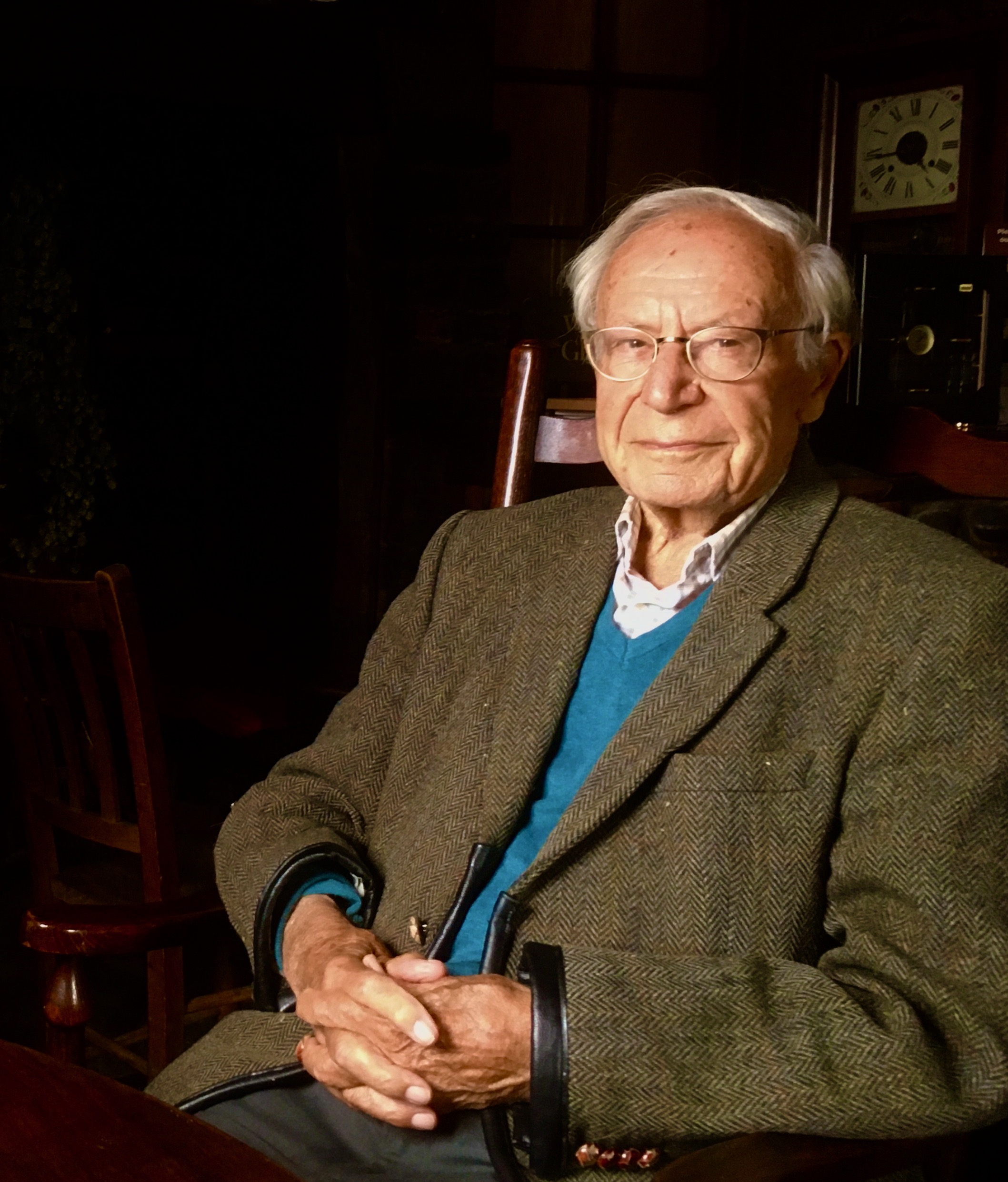
- Grove at the Queen's Head, Newton, 2022
- Born: 8 April 1924; England
- Died: 9 July 2023 (aged 99)
- Education: University of Cambridge
- Scientific career
- Fields: Geography, Desertification, Climatology
- Workplaces: University of Cambridge
- Doctoral students: Celia Nyamweru; Andrew Goudie; Claudio Vita-Finzi; Alayne Street-Perrott

Alfred Thomas Grove (8 April 1924 – 9 July 2023) — who usually published as 'A. T. Grove', but was always known as Dick Grove in everyday life — was a British geographer and climatologist. He was a Lecturer in the Department of Geography at the University of Cambridge, a Fellow of Downing College and a Director of the Cambridge Centre for African Studies. His research on long-term environmental change and desertification in Africa and in southern Europe helped shape understanding of past climate change. He was awarded the Busk Medal from the Royal Geographical Society in 1982 for his field work in Africa.

== Early life and education ==
Grove was born in Evesham, Worcestershire, the son of a fruit and vegetable grower. He attended Prince Henry’s Grammar School in Evesham, and in 1941 entered St Catharine's College, Cambridge to study geography under the guidance of the coastal geomorphologist Alfred Steers and the desert geomorphologist Ronald Peel, who were important early influences. He was a pilot in the Royal Air Force from 1942 to 1945, serving primarily in Air Training Command in Canada. He returned to Cambridge, finally graduating with a first class degree in 1947.

== Career and work ==
Grove worked briefly for the Colonial Office in Nigeria on the problem of soil erosion, before returning to Cambridge as a Demonstrator in the Department of Geography in 1949. He was appointed to a lectureship in 1954, and remained in Cambridge for the rest of his career (with sabbatical attachments teaching at the University of Ghana in 1963-4 and 1982, and University of California, Los Angeles in 1970). He was elected to a fellowship at Downing College in 1963, eventually becoming Senior Tutor and Vice Master. He was Director of the Cambridge Centre for African Studies in 1980-1986 during the time of the Ethiopian famines.

Grove made major contributions in the study of dryland geomorphology in the deserts of northern and southern Africa, by combining detailed mapping of geomorphological features through air photograph analysis with meticulous field verification. His work in the 1950s and 60s established the framework for subsequent geomorphological investigations of long-term environmental change in arid environments in Africa. His research on field expeditions in the Sahel, Tibesti, the Kalahari and the Ethiopian Rift established the scale of climate change on African desert margins. He and his students mapped ancient sand-seas around the Sahara and the Kalahari, showing massive desert expansion at the height of the last glaciation (20,000 to 12,500 years ago). Surveys of the fossil shorelines of ancient lakes showed the ‘greening’ of the Sahara in the early Holocene (10,000 to 5,000 years ago). In the early 1970s, when international attention was focused on the African Sahel by the tragedy of drought and famine, Grove's research found a new and important policy audience, challenging glib Malthusian arguments about population growth and ‘desertification’.

Through his role as a doctoral supervisor at Cambridge, working with students who went on to become influential researchers and teachers in their own right (notably Andrew Goudie, later Chair of Geography at Oxford and Master of St Cross College, Alayne Street-Perrott, later Professor of Geography at Swansea University, Andrew Warren, later Professor of Geography at University College London, Nick Lancaster, Research Professor at the University of Nevada’s Desert Research Institute, Mike Meadows, Professor of Geography at the University of Cape Town, and Bill Adams, Professor of Conservation and Development at the University of Cambridge), Grove created an important legacy in modern dryland science both in African environments and in dryland geomorphology more broadly.

From the late 1980s, Grove’s interests expanded to the environmental history of the Mediterranean, documenting the complex interplay between environment and peoples from the earliest times to the present. Following the death of his wife the glaciologist Jean Grove in 2001, he finalised the second edition of her seminal work on the Little Ice Age, published under the title 'Little Ice Ages, Ancient and Modern' (2004). Together with Oliver Rackham he wrote 'The Nature of Mediterranean Europe' (first published in 2001), the product of their fifteen-year collaboration on the environmental history of Crete and the Mediterranean.

Grove's work with Oliver Rackham on the environmental history of Crete and Mediterranean Europe casts doubt on the common conception of the region as a 'Lost Eden', a formerly fertile landscape that has been progressively degraded and desertified by human mismanagement since antiquity. They argue that environmental determinist notions of a lost Mediterranean Paradise originated in the failure of the landscape to measure up to the imaginary past idealised by artists, poets and scientists of the Enlightenment. Grove and Rackham tracked the evolution of climate, vegetation and landscape in the region from prehistoric times, and suggested that people had already transformed most parts of Mediterranean Europe 4,000 years ago, when present climate conditions were established. This produced 'humanised' landscapes with resilient ecological systems able to accommodate a range of human activities as well as climatic extremes, with the diversity seen as typical of Mediterranean Europe in modern times. In their view it is the changes since World War II that have been deleterious, as rural populations abandoned subsistence economies and traditional agricultural patterns. The real threat to Mediterranean landscapes, they argue, is now posed by overdevelopment of coastal areas, poor water management, abandonment of the mountain regions and the further loss of traditional agricultural occupations. They accordingly repudiate the neo-Malthusian analysis of land degradation in the region as a function of Hardin's so-called tragedy of the commons, pungently rejecting this interpretation as the viewpoint of 'an American with no notion at all how commons actually work'.

In one of his final papers, Grove's reconsideration of the problem of uncertainty in the field of climate change led him to the conclusion that despite the inherent difficulties in predicting the nature and extent of future climatic developments, the substantial evidence that human activity is causing global warming makes it 'safer to act, to mitigate and adapt with the aim of slowing down change'.

== Personal life ==
Dick Grove married Jean Mary Clark (1927–2001), herself a renowned glaciologist and climate historian and sister of the historian Margaret Spufford. They had six children, among them the pioneering environmental historian Richard Grove (1955-2020), whose writings are often confused with those of his father, on account of the correspondence in names and their closely related fields of expertise. Grove was a lifelong Roman Catholic, and member of the congregation at Blackfriar's Priory in Cambridge. He was among the trustees of the Jean Grove Trust, a small Catholic charity based in Cambridge which funds the education of children in Ethiopia through direct links with four schools in different parts of the country.

Dick Grove died on 9 July 2023, at the age of 99.

== Selected publications ==
- A.T. Grove (1958) 'The Ancient Erg of Hausaland and Similar Formations on the South Side of the Sahara'. Geographical Journal 124: 526-33
- A.T. Grove (1960). 'Geomorphology of the Tibesti Region with Special Reference to Western Tibesti', The Geographical Journal 126: 18-31
- A. T. Grove and R. A. Pullan (1963) 'Some aspects of the Pleistocene palaeogeography of the Chad basin'. In: F. C. Howell & E. Bourliere (eds), African ecology and human evolution. Viking Fund Publications in Anthropology 36. London: Methuen, pp. 230–45
- A.T. Grove (1967) Africa South of the Sahara. Oxford University Press (2nd ed. published in 1970)
- A.T. Grove and A. Warren (1968). Quaternary landforms and climate on the south side of the Sahara'. Geographical Journal 127: 204–208
- A.T. Grove (1969) 'Landforms and climatic change in the Kalahari and Ngamiland'. Geographical Journal 135: 191–212
- A.T. Grove (1971) 'Late Quaternary Lake Levels in the Rift Valley of Southern Ethiopia and Elsewhere in Tropical Africa', Nature 234: 493-5
- A.T. Grove (1974) 'Desertification in the African environment', African Affairs 72: 137-51
- A.T. Grove, F. A. Street, and A. S. Goudie (1975) 'Former lake levels and climatic change in the rift valley of southern Ethiopia'. Geographical Journal 141: 177–202
- F. A. Street and A.T. Grove (1976). 'Environmental and climatic implications of late Quaternary lake-level fluctuations in Africa'. Nature 261: 385-390
- A.T. Grove (1977) 'Desertification', Progress in Physical Geography: Earth and Environment 1: 296-310
- F. A. Street and A. T. Grove (1979) 'Global maps of lake-level fluctuations since 30,000 B.P.'. Quaternary Research 12: 83–118
- A.T. Grove (1978) Africa. Oxford University Press, Oxford (revised and expanded 3rd ed. of Africa South of the Sahara)
- A.T. Grove (1983) 'Evolution of the physical geography of the East African rift valley region'. In: E. W. Sims, J. H. Price, P. E. S. Whalley (eds), Evolution, time and space: The emergence of the biosphere. Academic Press, London, pp. 115–55
- A.T. Grove (ed.) (1985) The Niger and Its Neighbours: Environmental History and Hydrobiology, Human Use and Health Hazards of the Major West African Rivers. A.A. Balkema, Rotterdam
- A.T. Grove (1989) The Changing Geography of Africa. Oxford University Press (2nd ed. published 1993)
- A.T. Grove, Jennifer Moody, Oliver Rackham (1990) Stability & Change in the Cretan Landscape. Corpus Christi College, Cambridge
- A.T. Grove, Jennifer Moody, Oliver Rackham (1991) Crete and the South Aegean Islands: Effects of Changing Climate on the Environment. Final Report for the MEDALUS project Crete and the South Aegean Islands
- A.T. Grove (2001) 'The "Little Ice Age" and its Geomorphological Consequences in Mediterranean Europe'. Climatic Change 48: 121–36
- A.T. Grove and Oliver Rackham (2001) The Nature of Mediterranean Europe: An Ecological History. Yale University Press
- A.T. Grove (2008) 'The revolution in palaeoclimatology around 1970'. In: T. P. Burt, R. J. Chorley, D. Brunsden, N. J. Cox, and A. S. Goudie (eds.), The History of the Study of Landforms, Vol. 4. Geological Society of London, 961–1004
- A. S. Cohen, B. Van Bocxlaer, J. A. Todd, M. McGlue, E. Michel, H. H. Nkotagu, A.T. Grove, D. Delvaux (2013) 'Quaternary ostracodes and molluscs from the Rukwa Basin (Tanzania) and their evolutionary and paleobiogeographic implications'. Palaeogeography, Palaeoclimatology, Palaeoecology 392: 79–97
- A.T. Grove (2019) 'Reminiscences'. In: Martin, M., Damodaran, V., D'Souza, R. (eds) Geography in Britain after World War II. Palgrave Macmillan, Cham

== See also ==
- Historical climatology
- Jean Grove
- Richard Grove
- Alfred Steers
- Hubert Lamb
- Gordon Manley
- Oliver Rackham
