= Spufford =

Spufford is a surname. Notable people with the surname include:

- Francis Spufford (born 1964), English author and teacher of writing
- Margaret Spufford (1935–2014), British historian and academic
- Peter Spufford (1934–2017), British historian and academic
