= John E. Kutzbach =

American climatologist (1937–2021)

- Born: June 14, 1937; Reedsburg, Wisconsin, U.S.
- Died: January 29, 2021 (aged 83); Madison, Wisconsin, U.S.
- Education: University of Wisconsin–Madison (MS, PhD)
- Occupations: Climatologist; professor
- Spouse: Gisela Hanebuth (m. 1965)
- Children: 3
- Scientific career
- Fields: Climatology

John E. Kutzbach (June 14, 1937 (Reedsburg, Wisconsin) – January 29, 2021 (Madison, Wisconsin)) was an American climate scientist who pioneered the use of climate models to investigate the causes and effects of large changes of climate of the past.

== Career ==
John Elmer Kutzbach was Professor of Atmospheric and Oceanic Sciences at the Nelson Institute for Environmental Studies at the University of Wisconsin–Madison. He was a former Director and a Senior Scientist in the Center for Climatic Research (UW-Madison).

Kutzbach earned an undergraduate degree in engineering (1960), a M.S. degree (1961) and a Ph.D. (1966) in atmospheric science from the University of Wisconsin-Madison. He was an aviation weather forecaster in the United States Air Force, stationed in France (1961–1963). He joined the University of Wisconsin-Madison faculty in 1966, was named Plaenert-Bascom Professor of Liberal Arts in 1990, and has been professor emeritus since 2002.

He has been a regular summer visiting researcher at the National Center for Atmospheric Research, Boulder Colorado, since 1975. He assisted in the early planning of international climate research meetings and reports as a member of the Joint WMO/ICSU Planning Staff and the WMO GARP Activities Office at the World Meteorological Organization, Geneva Switzerland (1974).

He has held one-year visiting appointments at the Meteorological Office of the United Kingdom, Bracknell, England (1968) and the Univ. of Bonn, Germany (1978), and shorter visiting appointments at the Max-Planck Institute for Biogeochemistry, Jena, Germany (1999); the Univ. of Alaska – Fairbanks (2004); and the Univ. of Western Australia, Perth (2009).

Gisela Hanebuth (1941–2023) and John Kutzbach were married in Berlin, Germany on September 17, 1965. They both had careers as professors at University of Wisconsin-Madison. They have three children – Angela Kutzbach Currie, Katrina Kutzbach Martin, and Mark Kutzbach, and six grandchildren.

== Scientific accomplishments ==
Kutzbach pioneered the use of climate models to investigate the causes and effects of large-scale changes of climate of the past. He showed how changes in Earth's orbital parameters (eccentricity, precession, tilt) caused long-period changes in the tropical monsoons of Africa and Asia (1981,1982). He collaborated with an international group of paleoecologists, glaciologists, geomorphologists, and marine geologists in using field observations of past climate and environments in evaluating simulations of global climate from the last glacial maximum, 21000 years ago, to the present (1985, 1988, 1993a). This interdisciplinary project, the Cooperative Holocene Mapping Project (COHMAP), was among the early examples of broad international and interdisciplinary collaboration in studies of past climate, and was a forerunner of programs such as the Paleoclimate Model Intercomparison Project (PMIP).

Kutzbach's interdisciplinary collaboration continued in studies of earlier geologic eras using climate models to investigate the effects of large changes in Earth's orography (1989a, 2001), the altered land/ocean configuration of Pangea (1989b, 1993b), and long-period changes of orbital parameters (2014).

In early years he helped introduce to the atmospheric sciences the use of empirical orthogonal functions (EOFs) to identify large-scale and long-period modes of atmospheric circulation (1970). In recent years he has contributed to studies of how humans have been influenced by climate and climatic change (2014), contributed to its change (2010, 2016), and face potential future impacts (2007a).

He has authored or coauthored over 200 papers published in scientific journals. A symposium honoring his contributions was held in 2004; the collected papers of the symposium are published (2007b).

== Awards and honors ==
Kutzbach was elected a member of the National Academy of Sciences in 2006. He has also received the Roger Revelle Medal of the American Geophysical Union in 2006, the Milankovitch Medal of the European Geophysical Society in 2001, the Humboldt Research Award of the Alexander von Humboldt Foundation of Germany in 1976, the Distinguished Career Achievement Award of the American Quaternary Association in 2003, and the International Science and Technology Award of China in 2017. He was a Fellow of the American Association for the Advancement of Science, the American Geophysical Union, and the American Meteorological Society.

== Selected publications ==
- Kutzbach, John E. (1 September 1970). "Large-scale features of monthly mean Northern Hemisphere anomaly maps of sea-level pressure". Monthly Weather Review. 98 (9): 708–716. Bibcode:1970MWRv...98..708K. doi:10.1175/1520-0493(1970)098<0708:LSFOMM>2.3.CO;2.
- Kutzbach, J. E. (2 October 1981). "Monsoon Climate of the Early Holocene: Climate Experiment with the Earth's Orbital Parameters for 9000 Years Ago". Science. 214 (4516): 59–61. Bibcode:1981Sci...214...59K. doi:10.1126/science.214.4516.59. PMID 17802573. S2CID 10388125.
- Kutzbach, J. E.; Otto-Bliesner, B. L. (1 June 1982). "The Sensitivity of the African-Asian Monsoonal Climate to Orbital Parameter Changes for 9000 Years B.P. in a Low-Resolution General Circulation Model". Journal of the Atmospheric Sciences. 39 (6): 1177–1188. Bibcode:1982JAtS...39.1177K. doi:10.1175/1520-0469(1982)039<1177:TSOTAA>2.0.CO;2.
- Kutzbach, John E.; Street-Perrott, F. Alayne (September 1985). "Milankovitch forcing of fluctuations in the level of tropical lakes from 18 to 0 kyr BP". Nature. 317 (6033): 130–134. Bibcode:1985Natur.317..130K. doi:10.1038/317130a0. S2CID 11818963.
- COHMAP Members (26 August 1988). "Climatic Changes of the Last 18,000 Years: Observations and Model Simulations". Science. 241 (4869): 1043–1052. Bibcode:1988Sci...241.1043M. doi:10.1126/science.241.4869.1043. JSTOR 1702404. PMID 17747487.
- Ruddiman, W. F.; Kutzbach, J. E. (1989). "Forcing of late Cenozoic northern hemisphere climate by plateau uplift in southern Asia and the American west". Journal of Geophysical Research. 94 (D15) 18409. Bibcode:1989JGR....9418409R. doi:10.1029/JD094iD15p18409.
- Kutzbach, J. E.; Gallimore, R. G. (1989). "Pangaean climates: Megamonsoons of the megacontinent". Journal of Geophysical Research. 94 (D3): 3341. Bibcode:1989JGR....94.3341K. doi:10.1029/JD094iD03p03341.
- Wright, H.E. Jr, John E. Kutzbach, Thompson Webb III, William F. Ruddiman, Alayne Street-Perrott, and Patrick J. Bartlein, editors (1993a). "Global Climates since the Last Glacial Maximum", Univ. of Minnesota Press. 584p.
- Kutzbach, J.E. and Ziegler, A.M. (1993b). Simulation of late Permian climate and biomes with an atmosphere-ocean model: comparisons with observations. Philosophical Transactions of the Royal Society of London, Series B, 341: 327–340.
- An, Z., J.E. Kutzbach, W. Prell, S. Porter (2001). Evolution of Asian monsoons and phased uplift of the Himalaya-Tibetan plateau since Late Miocene times. Nature 411: 62–66.
- Williams, S. Jackson, J. Kutzbach (2007a). Projected distribution of novel and disappearing climates by 2100AD. Proceedings National Academy of Sciences 104: 5738–5742.
- Kutzbach, G., editor (2007b). Climate Variability and Change: Past, Present and Future; John E. Kutzbach Symposium, Center for Climatic Research, UW-Madison, 287p. Library of Congress Control Number 2007902354.
- Climate variability and change : past, present, and future : John E. Kutzbach Symposium
- Kutzbach, John E.; Ruddiman, W. F.; Vavrus, S. J.; Philippon, G. (April 2010). "Climate model simulation of anthropogenic influence on greenhouse-induced climate change (early agriculture to modern): the role of ocean feedbacks". Climatic Change. 99 (3–4): 351–381. Bibcode:2010ClCh...99..351K. doi:10.1007/s10584-009-9684-1. S2CID 154477452.
- Kutzbach, J. E.; Chen, G.; Cheng, H.; Edwards, R. L.; Liu, Z. (February 2014). "Potential role of winter rainfall in explaining increased moisture in the Mediterranean and Middle East during periods of maximum orbitally-forced insolation seasonality". Climate Dynamics. 42 (3–4): 1079–1095. Bibcode:2014ClDy...42.1079K. doi:10.1007/s00382-013-1692-1. S2CID 129591345.
- Ruddiman, W. F.; Fuller, D. Q.; Kutzbach, J. E.; Tzedakis, P. C.; Kaplan, J. O.; Ellis, E. C.; Vavrus, S. J.; Roberts, C. N.; Fyfe, R.; He, F.; Lemmen, C.; Woodbridge, J. (March 2016). "Late Holocene climate: Natural or anthropogenic?". Reviews of Geophysics. 54 (1): 93–118. Bibcode:2016RvGeo..54...93R. doi:10.1002/2015RG000503. hdl:10026.1/8204.
- Kutzbach, John E.; Guan, Jian; He, Feng; Cohen, Andrew S.; Orland, Ian J.; Chen, Guangshan (4 February 2020). "African climate response to orbital and glacial forcing in 140,000-y simulation with implications for early modern human environments". Proceedings of the National Academy of Sciences. 117 (5): 2255–2264. Bibcode:2020PNAS..117.2255K. doi:10.1073/pnas.1917673117. PMC 7007574. PMID 31964850.
