= Hoffer Brook =

River in Cambridgeshire, England

- Hoffer Brook near Foxton

Location
- Country: United Kingdom.
- Counties: Cambridgeshire
- Settlements: Thirplow, Newton, Foxton
- Continent: Europe
- Constituent Country: England

Physical characteristics
- Source
  - location: Thirplow
- 2nd source
  - location: Heathfield
- 3rd source
  - location: Foxton
- Mouth: River Rhee
  - location: Harston

Basin features
- Progression: River Rhee → Great Ouse → North Sea
- Tributaries
  - right: .

Hoffer Brook is a tributary of the river Rhee which is 8 km (5.0 mi) long. It is located in Cambridgeshire county.

== Course ==
It rises in a chalk aquifer near Thriplow and it is 8km. Another source of the brook rises north of Heathfield, next to the M11. It flows through Newton and the B1368. Additionally, another source of the brook rises east of Foxton. It then traverses through the A10 to join the River Rhee.

Footbridge over Hoffer Brook

== History ==
A Scheduled monument of an Iron Age to a Roman settlement is situated south-east of the brook. A cropmark includes a group of rectilinear enclosures arranged alongside two ditch-defined trackways which form a forked junction north of the settlement. The main trackway, along which enclosures are arranged, extends for 515m on a south east to north west alignment with a width of 12m.

== Water quality ==
The Environment Agency measures the water quality of the river systems in England. Each is given an overall ecological status, which may be one of five levels: high, good, moderate, poor and bad. There are several components that are used to determine this, including biological status, which looks at the quantity and varieties of invertebrates, angiosperms and fish; chemical status, which compares the concentration of various chemicals against known safe concentrations. Chemical status is rated good or fail.

Hoffer Brook Water Quality 2022
Water Body Name	Ecological Status	Biological Quality Elements	Hydromorphological Designation	Length	Catchment size
Hoffer Brook	Good	High	Heavily Modified	2.788 km (1.732 mi)	25.945 km^{2} (10.017 sq mi)
