= Jean Mitchell =

Jean Mitchell may refer to:

- Jean Mitchell (geographer)
- Jean Mitchell (sailor)
- Jean Mitchell (netball)
- Jean Mitchell (rower)

== See also ==
- Jean Holmes-Mitchell, Panamanian sprinter
