= Celia Nyamweru =

British-Kenyan physical geographer and anthropologist

- Education: Girton College, Cambridge (B.A., 1964; PhD., 1968)
- Scientific career
- Fields: Geography and anthropology of East Africa
- Workplaces: Kenyatta University, Kenya; St Lawrence University, NY.
- Thesis: Late Quaternary Lakes in the Nakuru-Elmenteita Basin, Kenya (1967)
- Doctoral advisor: Dick Grove

Celia Nyamweru (nee Washbourn) is a British-Kenyan physical geographer and anthropologist, known for her work on the climate, environment and culture of East Africa and the Rift Valley. She is professor emerita at St Lawrence University, USA, and adjunct professor at Pwani University, Kenya.

== Early life and education ==
Nyamweru was born Celia Washbourn in London, and grew up in Belgium, Sweden and Finland before going to high school in London. She completed A-levels in geography, physics and mathematics in 1960, and in 1961 went to Girton College, Cambridge to study geography.

As an undergraduate, she was influenced by the teaching of glaciologist Jean Grove and geographer Dick Grove. After completing her bachelor’s degree, Nyamweru remained in Cambridge and completed a PhD study on the freshwater lakes in the Kenya rift valley, under the supervision of Dick Grove. She completed her PhD in 1968, and moved to Kenya. There, she taught in schools for a while and, from January to June 1971, was a Visiting Assistant Professor of Geography at the University of Georgia, Athens, USA. Nyamweru then returned to Kenya and took up a lectureship at Kenyatta University, Nairobi. She became a Kenyan citizen in 1972.

== Research and career ==
Nyamweru's thesis focussed on the geological history of lakes from the Kenya rift valley, and in particular on the relationship between changes in lake levels and shorelines through the late Quaternary as an indication of changes in the climate. This, and follow-on work, led to a number of journal publications, including papers Nature and Science.

Nyamweru lectured at Kenyatta University, Kenya, for 19 years before moving to the United States in 1991. In her research, she has written widely on the anthropology and geography of East Africa, and has taught on topics including women in East Africa, development issues, and indigenous perceptions of the environment. For many years, she contributed to activity reports of the Tanzanian volcano Ol Doinyo Lengai to the Smithsonian institution's Global Volcanism Program, and in published articles.

During her career, Nyamweru spent some time in Cambridge as a research fellow at Wolfson College, Cambridge, in 2003-2004; and in Oxford, as a visiting fellow at St Hilda's College, Oxford.

== Publications ==
As well as publishing research articles in journals, Nyameru has written and edited a number of books and monographs on the physical geography and cultural anthropology of East Africa. She has also written textbooks for school geography students.

=== Selected books ===
- Nyamweru, Celia (2021). Some traditions of the Akamba of Kenya. Nairobi; Celia Nyamweru. p. 258. ISBN 9798753641663.
- Sheridan, Michael J.; Nyamweru, Celia (2008). African sacred groves : ecological dynamics & social change. Oxford : James Currey. pp. 1–230. ISBN 9781847014016.
- Nyamweru, Celia (1980). Rifts and Volcanoes: A Study of the East African Rift System. Nelson Africa. ISBN 0175114471.
