= Historical climatology =

Academic field of study

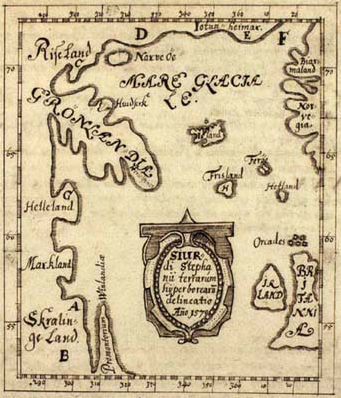
The 16th-century Skálholt Map of Norse America

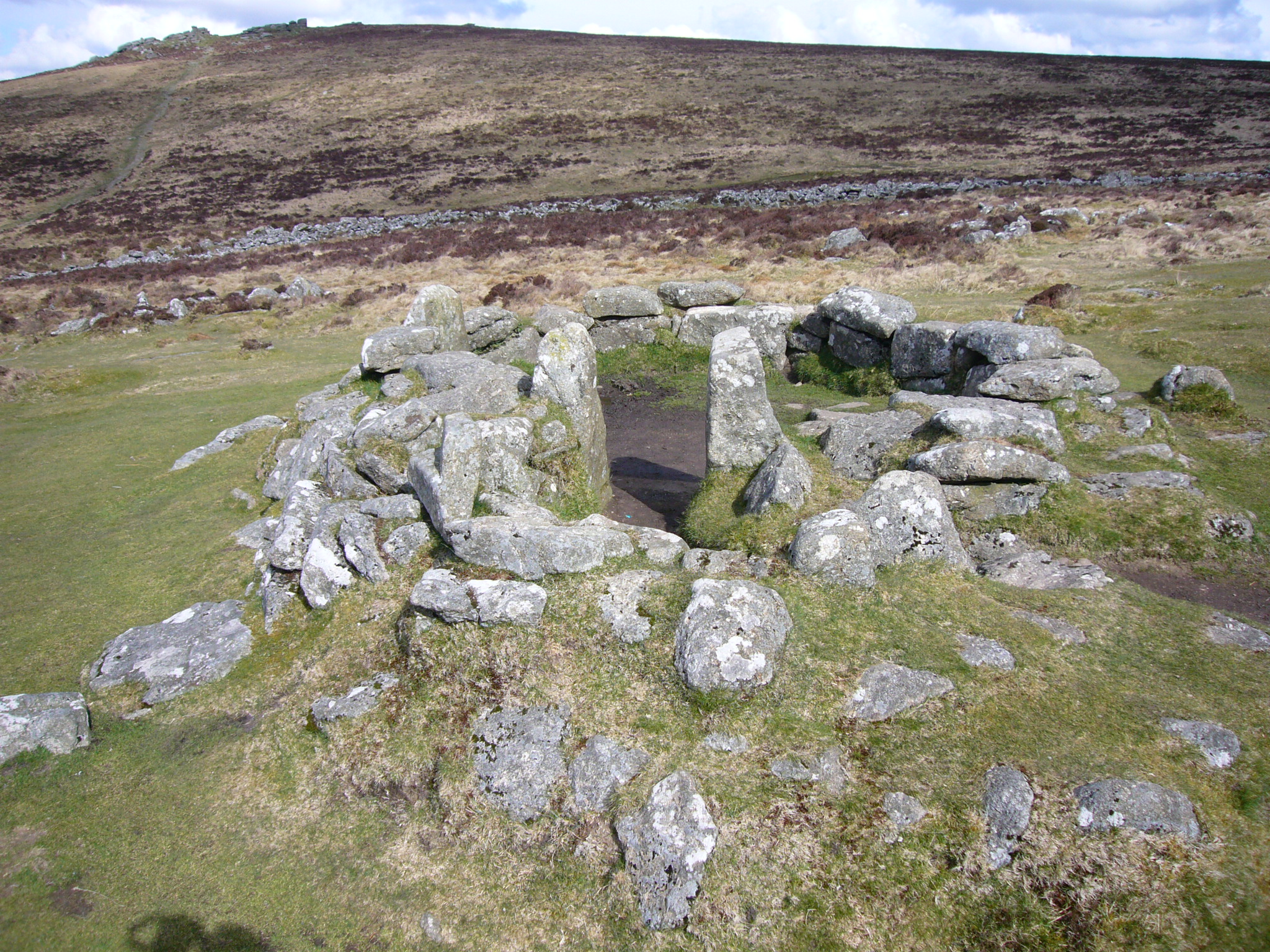
One of Grimspound's hut circles

Historical climatology is the study of historical changes in climate and their effect on civilization from the emergence of homininis to the present day. It is concerned with the reconstruction of weather and climate and their effect on historical societies, including a culturally influenced history of science and perception. This is done in the broader context of environmental history. This differs from paleoclimatology which encompasses climate change over the entire history of Earth. These historical impacts of climate change can improve human life and cause societies to flourish, or can be instrumental in civilization's societal collapse. The study seeks to define periods in human history where temperature or precipitation varied from what is observed in the present day.

The primary sources include written records such as sagas, chronicles, maps and local history literature as well as pictorial representations such as paintings, drawings and even rock art. The archaeological record is equally important in establishing evidence of settlement, water and land usage.

== Methods ==
In literate societies, historians may find written evidence of climatic variations over hundreds or thousands of years, such as phenological records of natural processes, for example viticultural records of grape harvest dates. In preliterate or non-literate societies, researchers must rely on other techniques to find evidence of historical climate differences.

Past population levels and habitable ranges of humans or plants and animals may be used to find evidence of past differences in climate for the region. Palynology, the study of pollens, can show not only the range of plants and to reconstruct possible ecology, but to estimate the amount of precipitation in a given time period, based on the abundance of pollen in that layer of sediment or ice. The distribution of diatoms in sediments can also be used to examine changes in salinity and climate over geologic eras.

Almanac for January 1600. To the left Gregorian dates including Saints days. To the right abridged Julian dates plus Saints days. Right page weather notes. Source: German calendar used by Hans Jakob vom Staal the Elder for notes on current events

The Palgrave Handbook of Climate History provides a comprehensive overview of the methods and results of historical climatology in a global context. According to this, information in historical documents should not be taken at face value without verification. The most credible are reports by contemporaries that were recorded shortly after the event and dated documents from institutions. Transcripts of sources are prone to error. Furthermore, attention must be paid to correct dating. Globally, there have been two major systems of calendars: solar calendars based (approximately) on the revolution of the Earth around the sun, and lunar calendars based on the orbit of the moon. The former have historically been used in Europe (and its colonies), India, and Iran, while lunar calendars were historically used in the Islamic world and imperial China. It is also important to distinguish between Julian (“old style”) (Julian Calendar) and Gregorian (“new style”) dates (Gregorian Calendar). When "Saints'" days are used for dating, it must be determined whether the dates refer to the new or to the old calendar. Any corrections must be made accordingly. The presented almanac for the year 1600 displays the two dating styles including the Saints days side by side. The “old” Julian calendar to the right celebrates “Chris" [i.e. Christmas] 10 days later than the 'new” Gregorian calendar to the left, namely on 4 January. If Saints Days are used for dating attention must be paid to the calendar used, as the reproduction of the almanac illustrated shows

Historical climatologists have created an interface between narrative and proxy data in the form of an ordinal index that allows converting disparate documentary evidence into continuous quantitative data that can be presented as time series A differentiated representation of thermal and wetness conditions was developed for Europe in terms of a temperature and precipitation index for nearly every month for which evidence of sufficient data density and quality is available. The so-called Pfister index comprises seven ordinal classes on a scale from -3 to +3. referring to deviations from a reference period in the 20th century that must be declared. Chroniclers included proxy data on plant development and the frequency of snow and ice to compare the meteorological conditions of a given year with those of other years. The interpretation draws on the complementarity between proxy data and the description of the associated weather pattern which needs to be consistent with the proxy.. Proxy information must be calibrated, meaning they must be statistically compared. against instrumental data. Chroniclers also describe effects of weather and climate on the human and the natural environment. This information is case-specific and relates to the historical context. If no relevant proxy data is available, narrative data should therefore be just assigned to index classes 1 ‘warm’ or -1 ‘cold’, regardless of the wording to prevent overestimation

Until the early 2020s, documentary climate data was mainly limited to regional and local scales. In contrast to natural‑science proxy communities—such as the dendrochronologiclal community, which is embedded in globally coordinated research networks—documentary sources had rarely been integrated into large‑scale or global frameworks. Cultural and linguistic barriers long impeded the development of a global perspective. To unlock the potential of quantitative documentary evidence, researchers at the Oeschger Centre for Climate Change Research led by Stefan Brönnimann, compiled a global inventory of climate‑relevant information contained in historical documents. As part of a meteorological Reanalysis, documentary data spanning the period from 1421 to 2008 was evaluated in conjunction with natural proxy records, particularly tree‑ring data A dedicated software enables the generation of flexible spatio-temporal reconstructions, including maps and time series

== Role in human evolution ==
Changes in East African climate have been associated with the evolution of hominini. Researchers have proposed that the regional environment transitioned from humid jungle to more arid grasslands due to tectonic uplift and changes in broader patterns of ocean and atmospheric circulation. This environmental change is believed to have forced hominins to evolve for life in a savannah-type environment. Some data suggest that this environmental change caused the development of modern hominin features; however there exist other data that show that morphological changes in the earliest hominins occurred while the region was still forested. Rapid tectonic uplift likely occurred in the early Pleistocene, changing the local elevation and broadly reorganizing the regional patterns of atmospheric circulation. This can be correlated with the rapid hominin evolution of the Quaternary period. Changes in climate at 2.8, 1.7, and 1.0 million years ago correlate well with observed transitions between recognized hominin species. It is difficult to differentiate correlation from causality in these paleopanthropological and paleoclimatological reconstructions, so these results must be interpreted with caution and related to the appropriate time-scales and uncertainties.

== Ice ages ==
The eruption of the Toba supervolcano, 70,000 to 75,000 years ago reduced the average global temperature by 5 degrees Celsius for several years and may have triggered an ice age. It has been postulated that this created a bottleneck in human evolution. A much smaller but similar effect occurred after the eruption of Krakatoa in 1883, when global temperatures fell for about 5 years in a row.

Before the retreat of glaciers at the start of the Holocene (~9600 BC), ice sheets covered much of the northern latitudes and sea levels were much lower than they are today. The start of our present interglacial period appears to have helped spur the development of human civilization.

== Role in human migration and agriculture ==
Climate change has been linked to human migration from as early as the end of the Pleistocene to the early twenty-first century. The effect of climate on available resources and living conditions such as food, water, and temperature drove the movement of populations and determined the ability for groups to begin a system of agriculture or continue a foraging lifestyle.

Groups such as the inhabitants of northern Peru and central Chile, the Saqqaq in Greenland, nomadic Eurasian tribes in Historical China, and the Natufian culture in the Levant all display migration reactions due to climatic change.

=== Further descriptions of specific cases ===
In northern Peru and central Chile climate change is cited as the driving force in a series of migration patterns from about 15,000 B.C. to approximately 4,500 B.C. Between 11,800 B.C. and 10,500 B.C. evidence suggests seasonal migration from high to low elevation by the natives while conditions permitted a humid environment to persist in both areas. Around 9,000 B.C. the lakes that periodically served as a home to the natives dried up and were abandoned until 4,500 B.C. This period of abandonment is a blank segment of the archeological record known in Spanish as the silencio arqueológico. During this break, there exists no evidence of activity by the natives in the lakes area. The correlation between climate and migratory patterns leads historians to believe the Central Chilean natives favored humid, low-elevation areas especially during periods of increased aridity.

The different inhabitants of Greenland, specifically in the west, migrated primarily in response to temperature change. The Saqqaq people arrived in Greenland around 4,500 B.P. and experienced moderate temperature variation for the first 1,100 years of occupation; near 3,400 B.P. a cooling period began that pushed the Saqqaq toward the west. A similar temperature fluctuation occurred around 2,800 B.P. that led to the abandonment of the inhabited Saqqaq region; this temperature shift was a decrease in temperature of about 4 °C over 200 years. Following the Saqqaq dominance, other groups such as the Dorset people inhabited west Greenland; the Dorset were sea-ice hunters that had tools adapted to the colder environment. The Dorset appeared to leave the region around 2,200 B.P. without clear connection to the changing environment. Following the Dorset occupation, the Norse began to appear around 1,100 B.P. in west Greenland during a significant warming period. However, a sharp decrease in temperature beginning in 850 B.P. of about 4 °C in 80 years is thought to contribute to the demise of initial Norse occupation in western Greenland.

In Historical China over the past 2,000 years, migration patterns have centered around precipitation change and temperature fluctuation. Pastoralists moved in order to feed the livestock that they cared for and to forage for themselves in more plentiful areas. During dry periods or cooling periods the nomadic lifestyle became more prevalent because pastoralists were seeking more fertile ground. The precipitation was a more defining factor than temperature in terms of its effects on migration. The trend of the migrating Chinese showed that the northern pastoralists were more affected by the fluctuation in precipitation than the southern nomads. In a majority of cases, pastoralists migrated further southward during changes in precipitation. These movements were not classified by one large event or a specific era of movement; rather, the relationship between climate and nomadic migration is relevant from "a long term perspective and on a large spatial scale."

The Natufian population in the Levant was subject to two major climatic changes that influenced the development and separation of their culture. As a consequence of increased temperature, the expansion of the Mediterranean woodlands occurred approximately 13,000 years ago; with that expansion came a shift to sedentary foraging adopted by the surrounding population. Thus, a migration toward the higher-elevation woodlands took place and remained constant for nearly 2,000 years. This era ended when the climate became more arid and the Mediterranean forest shrank 11,000 years ago. Upon this change, some of the Natufian populations nearest sustainable land transitioned into an agricultural way of life; sustainable land was primarily near water sources. Those groups that did not reside near a stable resource returned to the nomadic foraging that was prevalent prior to sedentary life.

== Historical and prehistoric societies ==
The rise and fall of societies have often been linked to environmental factors.

Evidence of a warm climate in Europe, for example, comes from archaeological studies of settlement and farming in the Early Bronze Age at altitudes now beyond cultivation, such as Dartmoor, Exmoor, the Lake District and the Pennines in Great Britain. The climate appears to have deteriorated towards the Late Bronze Age however. Settlements and field boundaries have been found at high altitude in these areas, which are now wild and uninhabitable. Grimspound on Dartmoor is well preserved and shows the standing remains of an extensive settlement in a now inhospitable environment.

Some parts of the present Saharan desert may have been populated when the climate was cooler and wetter, judging by cave art and other signs of settlement in Prehistoric Central North Africa.

=== Societal growth and urbanization ===
Approximately one millennium after the 7 ka slowing of sea-level rise, many coastal urban centers rose to prominence around the world. It has been hypothesized that this is correlated with the development of stable coastal environments and ecosystems and an increase in marine productivity (also related to an increase in temperatures), which would provide a food source for hierarchical urban societies.

=== Societal collapse ===
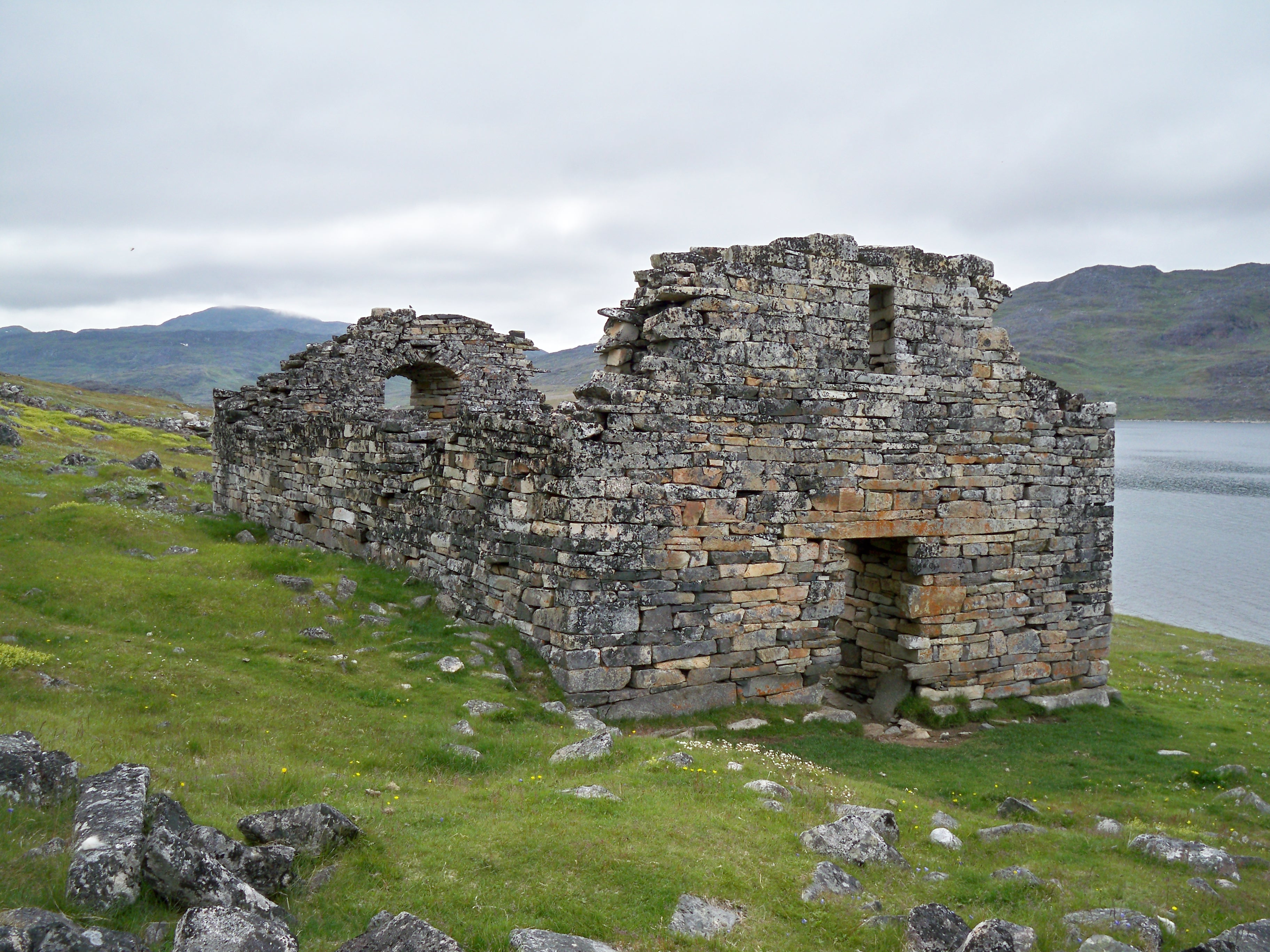
The last written records of the Norse Greenlanders are from a 1408 marriage in Hvalsey Church — today the best-preserved of the Norse ruins.

Climate change has been associated with the historical collapse of civilizations, cities and dynasties. Notable examples of this include the Anasazi, Classic Maya, the Harappa, the Hittites, and Ancient Egypt. Other, smaller communities such as the Viking settlement of Greenland have also suffered collapse with climate change being a suggested contributory factor.

There are two proposed methods of Classic Maya collapse: environmental and non-environmental. The environmental approach uses paleoclimatic evidence to show that movements in the Intertropical Convergence Zone likely caused severe, extended droughts during a few time periods at the end of the archaeological record for the classic Maya. The non-environmental approach suggests that the collapse could be due to increasing class tensions associated with the building of monumental architecture and the corresponding decline of agriculture, increased disease, and increased internal warfare.

The Harappa and Indus civilizations were affected by drought 4,500–3,500 years ago. A decline in rainfall in the Middle East and Northern India 3,800–2,500 is likely to have affected the Hittites and Ancient Egypt.

=== Medieval Warm Period ===
The Medieval Warm Period was a time of warm weather between about AD 800–1300, during the European Medieval period. Archaeological evidence supports studies of the Norse sagas which describe the settlement of Greenland in the 9th century AD of land now quite unsuitable for cultivation. For example, excavations at one settlement site have shown the presence of birch trees during the early Viking period. In the case of the Norse, the Medieval warm period was associated with the Norse age of exploration and Arctic colonization, and the later colder periods led to the decline of those colonies. The same period records the discovery of an area called Vinland, probably in North America, which may also have been warmer than at present, judging by the alleged presence of grape vines.

== Little Ice Age ==
Later examples include the Little Ice Age, well documented by paintings, documents (such as diaries) and events such as the River Thames frost fairs held on frozen lakes and rivers in the 17th and 18th centuries. The River Thames was made more narrow and flowed faster after old London Bridge was demolished in 1831, and the river was embanked in stages during the 19th century, both of which made the river less liable to freezing.

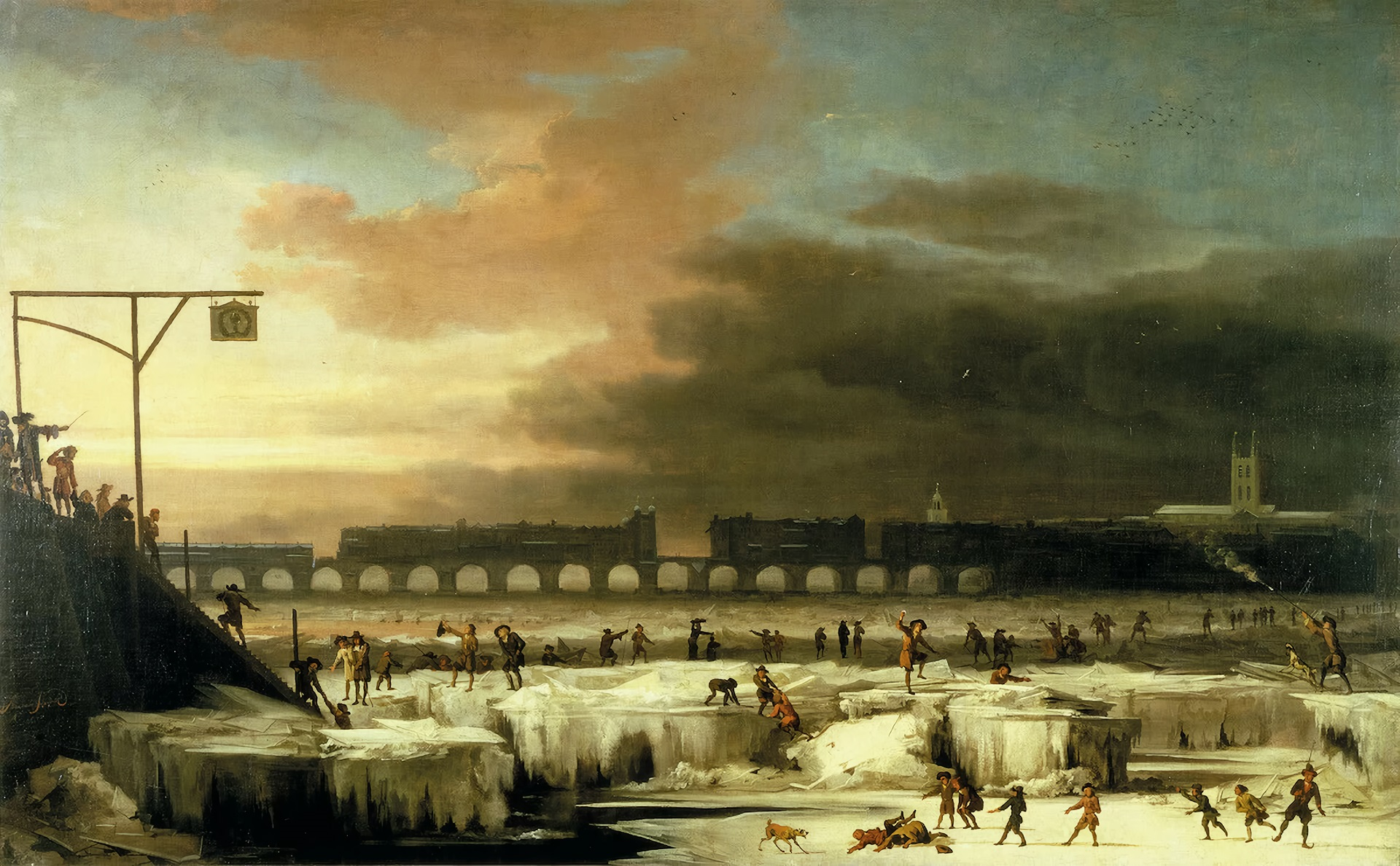
The Frozen Thames by Abraham Hondius, 1677

The Little Ice Age brought colder winters to parts of Europe and North America. In the mid-17th century, glaciers in the Swiss Alps advanced, gradually engulfing farms and crushing entire villages. The River Thames and the canals and rivers of the Netherlands often froze over during the winter, and people skated and even held frost fairs on the ice. The first Thames frost fair was in 1607; the last in 1814, although changes to the bridges and the addition of an embankment affected the river flow and depth, diminishing the possibility of freezes. The freeze of the Golden Horn and the southern section of the Bosphorus took place in 1622. In 1658, a Swedish army marched across the Great Belt to Denmark to invade Copenhagen. The Baltic Sea froze over, enabling sledge rides from Poland to Sweden, with seasonal inns built on the way. The winter of 1794/1795 was particularly harsh when the French invasion army under Pichegru could march on the frozen rivers of the Netherlands, while the Dutch fleet was fixed in the ice in Den Helder harbour. In the winter of 1780, New York Harbor froze, allowing people to walk from Manhattan to Staten Island. Sea ice surrounding Iceland extended for miles in every direction, closing that island's harbours to shipping.

The severe winters affected human life in ways large and small. The population of Iceland fell by half, but this was perhaps also due to fluorosis caused by the eruption of the volcano Laki in 1783. Iceland also suffered failures of cereal crops and people moved away from a grain-based diet. The Norse colonies in Greenland starved and vanished (by the 15th century) as crops failed and livestock could not be maintained through increasingly harsh winters, though Jared Diamond noted that they had exceeded the agricultural carrying capacity before then. In North America, American Indians formed leagues in response to food shortages. In Southern Europe, in Portugal, snow storms were much more frequent while today they are rare. There are reports of heavy snowfalls in the winters of 1665, 1744 and 1886.

In contrast to its uncertain beginning, there is a consensus that the Little Ice Age ended in the mid-19th century.

== Evidence of anthropogenic climate change ==
Through deforestation and agriculture, some scientists have proposed a human component in some historical climatic changes. Human-started fires have been implicated in the transformation of much of Australia from grassland to desert. If true, this would show that non-industrialized societies could have a role in influencing regional climate. Deforestation, desertification and the salinization of soils may have contributed to or caused other climatic changes throughout human history.

For a discussion of recent human involvement in climatic changes, see Attribution of recent climate change.

== See also ==
- CLIWOC, Climatological database for the world's oceans (1750–1854)
- Global warming
- History of climate change science
- Temperature record
- Little Ice Age
- Alfred Thomas Grove
- Jean Grove
- Hubert Lamb
- Gordon Manley
- Christian Pfister (Swiss historian)
