= Hauxton Mill =

Former watermill in Hauxton, Cambridgeshire, England

Coordinates: 52.1540°N 0.0917°E

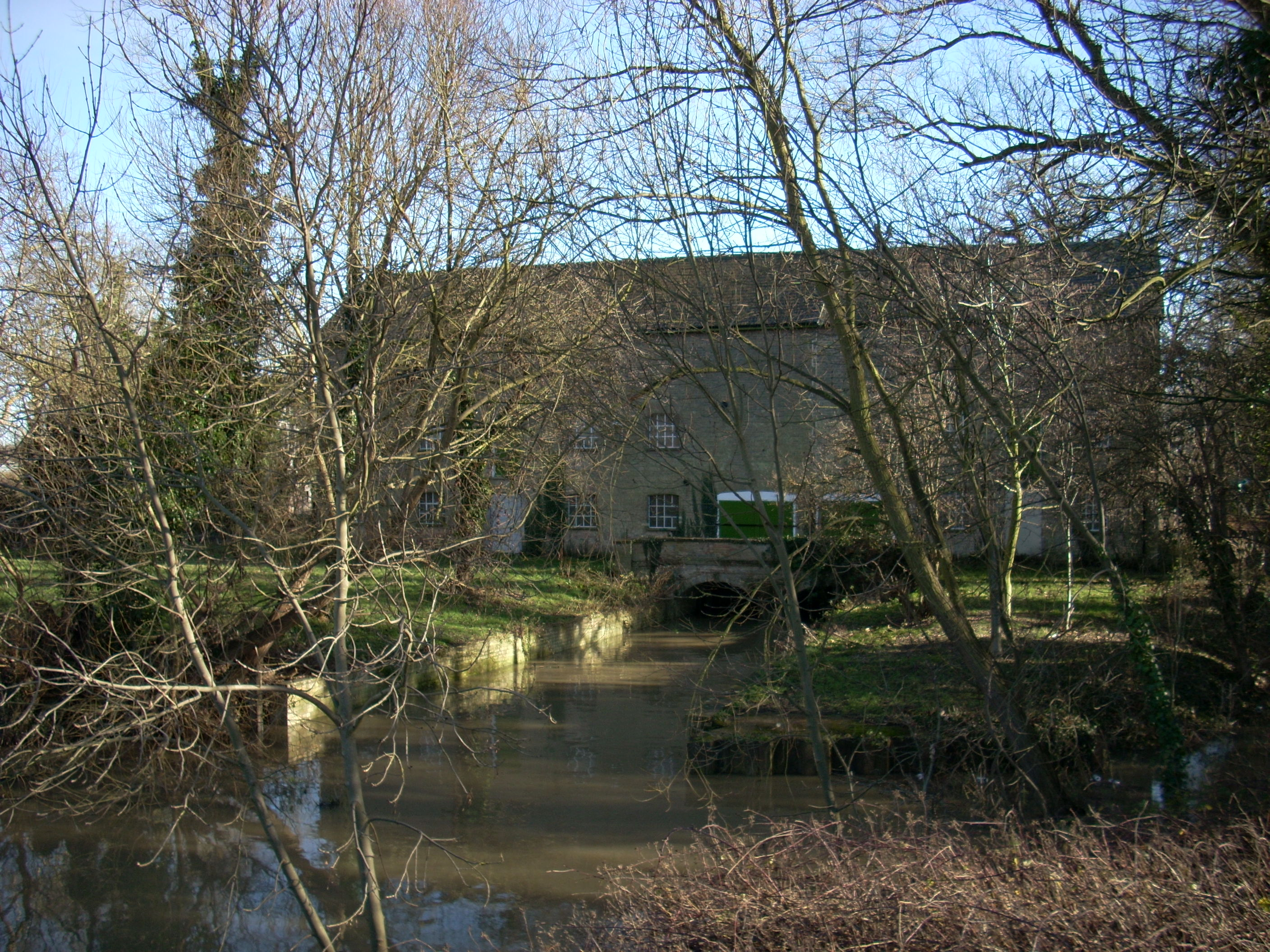
Hauxton mill

The Hauxton Mill is a classic English watermill on the old A10 road between Cambridge and Royston, England.

Commercial activity ceased at the mill in 1974, when the last Miller (Gerald Maurice Arthur "Moss" Turner) liquidated his civil engineering businesses (G.M.A. Turner & Son Ltd) which operated out of the mill and its grounds. The mill at the time belonged to a local landowner as part of his estate.

The neighbouring site was owned by a chemical pesticide company known as "Pest Control" for many years. The plant closed in 2004 and the site was sold for a development to be named Hauxton Meadows.

Because of government legislation, Fisons Agrochem, the previous owners of the development site, were obliged to buy out the neighbouring properties with residential housing. This included the mill site because of the newer Hauxton Mill House (approx 1922), which was part of the office complex for the plant, and Mill Cottage (rebuilt 1973).

At first, Fisons rented the mill from the landowner, and used the mill itself for storage. Planning permission to convert the building to various uses was always rejected due to the historic interest. Mill House was converted to flats, and after another round of legal changes was finally used as an administrative office before falling into disuse in the mid eighties.

The mill was left unattended, with the doors and windows blocked and barred, and gradually fell into a state of disrepair. A grate in front of the mill wheel was removed for now forgotten reasons, and a storm sent a tree crashing into the wooden wheel, effectively ending the operability of the mill around 1980. The grating has since been replaced and the remains of the tree removed. An adjacent, non-listed building, the former mill-keeper's house, which had been derelict and overgrown for some time, was destroyed by a fire, treated as arson, in July 2020.

In 2018, o2h group acquired Hauxton Mill, and developed the site into Mill SciTech Park.

o2h co-work labs operates the Mill SciTech Park in Hauxton, Cambridge, a place for entrepreneurs, scientists, techies & dreamers. Supported by high specification labs to create a genuinely unique environment for creativity and innovation to thrive.

== See also ==
- Hauxton
