= Lancaster Environment Centre =

Interdisciplinary centre at Lancaster University

Coordinates: 54.009°N 2.786°W

- Type: Science centre
- Established: 2007
- Parent institution: Lancaster University (Faculty of Science and Technology)
- Director: Prof. Kirk Semple
- Address: Lancaster Environment Centre, Lancaster University, Lancaster, LA1 4YQ, UK, Lancaster, United Kingdom
- Campus: Semi-rural
- Website: http://www.lec.lancs.ac.uk/

The Lancaster Environment Centre (LEC) in Lancaster, England, is an interdisciplinary centre for teaching, research and collaboration at Lancaster University, founded in 2007.

== Facilities ==
LEC's facilities were a joint investment eventually costing over £35 million by NERC / UKCEH and Lancaster University. There are UKCEH and Lancaster University laboratories, developed partly by a new extension to Lancaster University's former Biological and Environmental Sciences building and partly by extensive refurbishment of areas of the existing laboratories. Research activities span both organisations. There are extensive research laboratories, fifteen glasshouses and ten walk-in controlled environment rooms. These include high-grade containment facilities for research with genetically modified organisms and radionuclides.

On 22 May 2007, the Gordon Manley Building (LEC III) was opened by Lord Rees of Ludlow Kt. The £8.4m building provides new office, laboratory and meeting-room space for geographers and environmental scientists. It also provides offices, meeting and training rooms for LEC's Enterprise & Business Partnerships Team and offices for companies wishing to locate into LEC or to co-locate new activities.

In addition to the main site is a 1000m² prefabricated building at the northern end of campus, which houses environmental engineering and instrumentation workshops and large-scale sample preparation facilities for UKCEH. There is a weather station and several field stations around the world.

== Organisation ==
Several interdisciplinary grand research challenges provide a focus for LEC's fundamental and applied research:

- Agri-Food - facilitate the development of globally relevant and accessible food systems by 2030.
- Eco-Innovation - sustainable patterns of consumption and production.
- Science for the Anthropocene - seeking a different, pragmatic approach to science for the future that puts the human dimension centre stage.
- Sustainable Catchments - sustainable management of rainfall catchment areas for the benefit of downstream water flows and quality.
- Tropical Futures - understanding the social and ecosystem issues in the tropics to foster better outcomes for both people and the environment.

Specific interdisciplinary research groups were reorganised in 2016:

- Atmosphere, Climate and Pollution - the sources, transformation, trends and fate of chemicals in the environment with a focus on atmospheric composition, air quality and climate.
- Critical Geographies - critical geographies that are vital to sustainability, social and environmental justice and our collective futures. Led by Professor Gordon Walker or Professor Nigel Clark.
- Earth Science: Volcanology and Hazards, Contemporary Environmental Processes, Sub-surface Fluids and Palaeoclimatology and Palaeoenvironments.
- Ecology and Conservation - molecular, behavioural and ecological techniques to understand how ecosystems function, how they respond to global change, and how they can be managed to enhance biodiversity and its associated services.
- Environmental and Biogeochemistry - inorganic chemistry, stable and radioactive isotopes, noble gases and trace organic analysis.
- Geospatial Data Science - innovative spatial techniques in order to increase our understanding of a wide range of environmental and socio-ecological systems.
- Political Ecology - relationship between culture, politics and nature. Led by Professor Simon Batterbury and since 2019, Professor Frances Cleaver.
- Soil, Plant and Land Systems - molecular to the crop scale.
- Water Science - pure and applied research studying processes that control the movement, availability and quality of water.

These provide a range of research interests within the Lancaster Environment Centre and are post-disciplinary. A Graduate School of the Environment was launched in 2016, to provide a focus for Masters and PhD students, in partnership with UKCEH and Rothamsted Research.

== LEC Centres ==
In addition to this research endeavour, the LEC researchers collaborate through a number of research centres to provide a specific strategic research focus on particular areas of current concern. These undertake blue skies research and provide a strategic focus for LEC's collaborative work with science users, including policymakers and industry.

=== Centre of Excellence in Environmental Data Science ===
The Centre is currently targeting the development of self-managing heterogeneous infrastructures for data gathering and analysis at a wide range of temporal and spatial scales for both science and industry. This experimental research is motivated by the need to characterise and model the non-linear interdependencies between dynamic natural processes and enable improved prediction of the impacts of factors such as climate change and changes in land-use.

=== Centre for Global Eco-Innovation ===
The Centre for Global Eco-Innovation supports the development of new products and services with environmental benefits.

=== Pentland Centre for Sustainability in Business ===
The Pentland Centre is a joint research centre with Lancaster University Management School delivering research on sustainability in business. Led by Prof. Jan Bebbington and formerly, Prof. Gail Whiteman.

== Enterprise & business partnerships ==
The purpose of the business incubation centre within LEC is to allow environmental business to rent office space within the centre, enabling faster business growth through finding easier access to LEC research, knowledge, laboratories, clean rooms, workshops and specialist instruments.

== Recognition ==
- Placed 19th in the UK for Geography undergraduate degree in 2023 Guardian University Guide
- Placed 3rd in the UK for real-world impact of research in Research Excellence Framework 2014
- Placed 1st for knowledge exchange and commercialisation in UK Impact Awards 2015
- Emeritus Professor Keith Beven is the most highly cited hydrologist in the world.
