= Hauxton =

Village in Cambridgeshire, England

Coordinates: 52.1488°N 0.1037°E

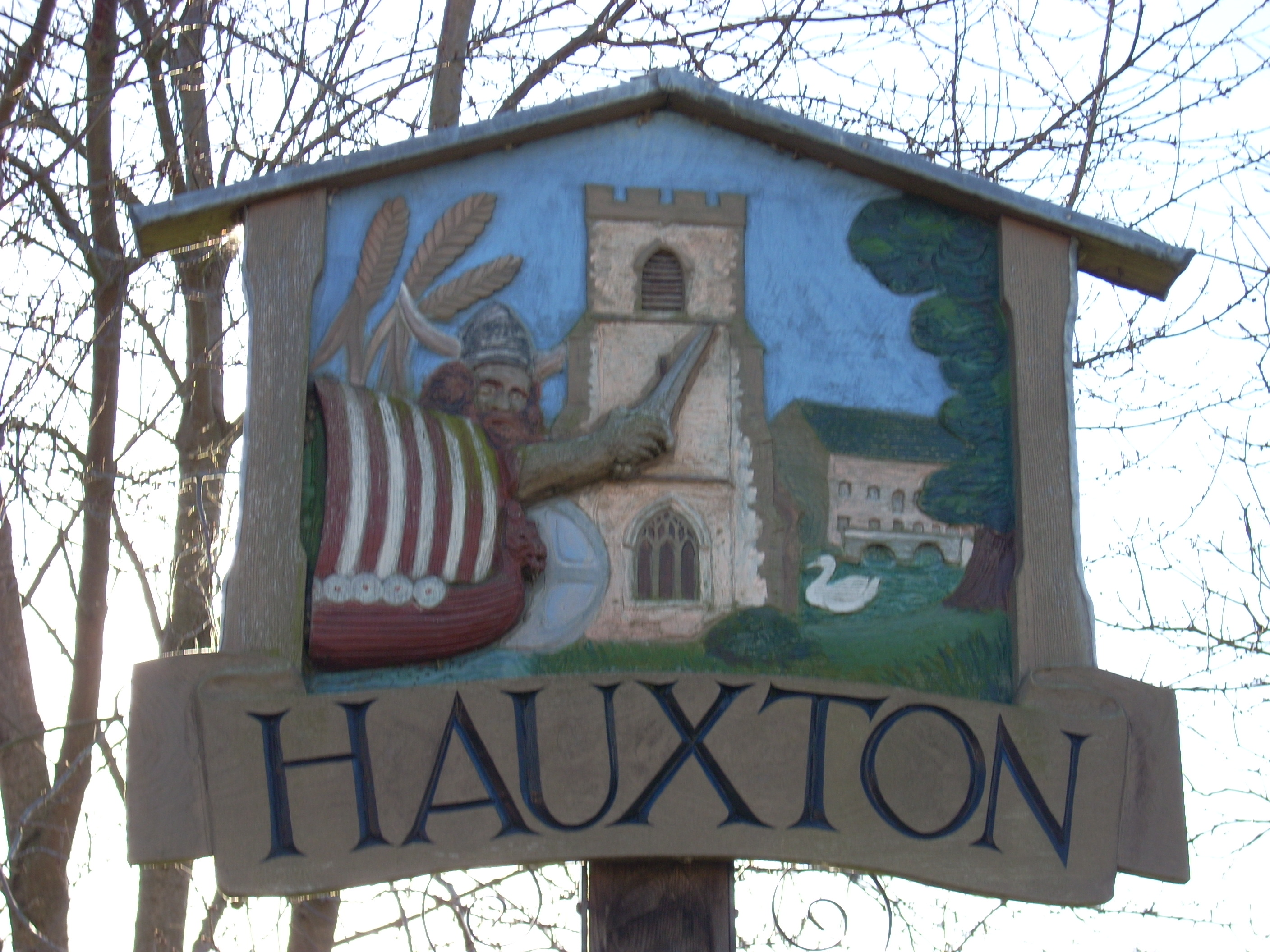
- Village sign

- Location within Cambridgeshire
- Population: 687; 673 (2011 Census)
- OS grid reference: TL437523
- Civil parish: Hauxton
- District: South Cambridgeshire
- Shire county: Cambridgeshire
- Region: East
- Country: England
- Sovereign state: United Kingdom
- Post town: CAMBRIDGE
- Postcode district: CB22
- Dialling code: 01223

Hauxton is a small village in Cambridgeshire, England around 5 miles to the south-west of Cambridge.

== History ==
Hauxton has been occupied for well over two thousand years thanks to its position on the River Cam and a ford near Hauxton Mill that has probably been used since the Bronze Age. A bridge was added in the 14th century. A settlement to the north-east of the mill, with a cemetery of over 100 graves is believed to have been in use from the early Iron Age, through Belgic and Roman occupation until Anglo-Saxon times.

The history of Hauxton has long been tied to that of neighbouring Newton; they were ruled by a single manor, were a single civil parish until the 16th century and until 1930 formed a single ecclesiastical parish. There were disputes over the parish boundaries with Harston and Little Shelford until they were finally settled in 1800, when the parish of Hauxton was set at 239 hectares.

In 970 the land around Newton and Hauxton was passed to King Edgar who offered them to Bishop Aethelwold for the new Abbey at Ely. However, Edgar died before the lands were transferred and the lands were subject to a series of disputes until they were purchased for the Abbey.

At the time of the Domesday Book the manor at Hauxton was owned by Ely Abbey and remained so until the Dissolution of the Monasteries in 1539. Since then the manor has been owned by the Dean and Chapter of Ely Cathedral.

The modern village built up along a single street that runs approximately parallel to the River Cam from the old London to Cambridge road (now the A10) towards Little Shelford. From the 14th century there was an additional settlement, known as Mill End, around the mill site. The settlement grew, particularly when the road became a turnpike and two alehouses, the Ship and the Chequers, opened in the late 18th century.

Listed as Hafucestune in the 10th century and Hauochestun in the Domesday Book, the name Hauxton means "Farmstead of a man called Hafoc". In 1316 it was noted as Haukestone.

== Church ==
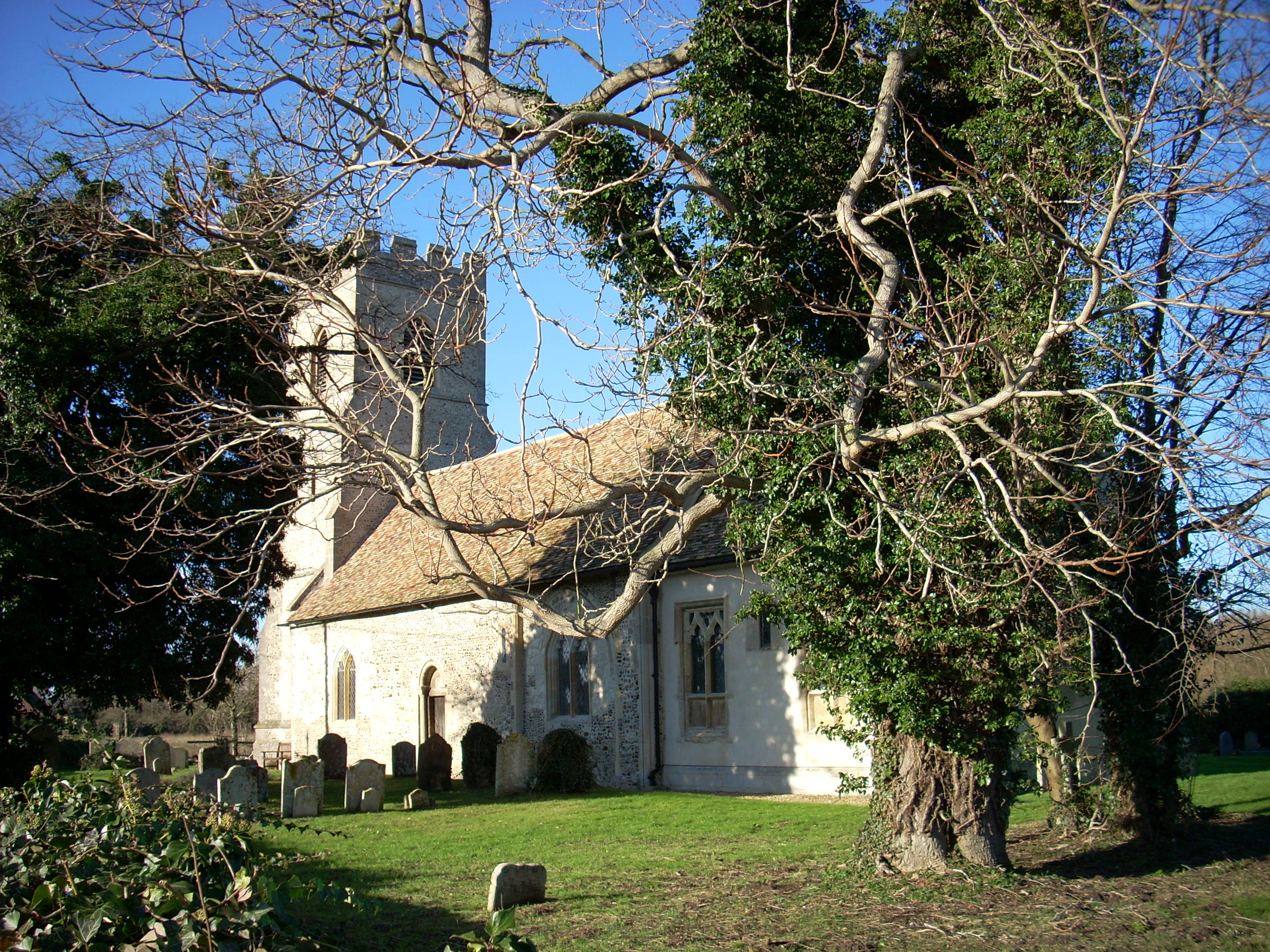
Church of St Edmund

The parish church, dedicated to St Edmund since the 15th century, was probably founded prior to the Norman Conquest. The present building is small and comprises a chancel, nave, and west tower. It has been largely unchanged since its construction in the 12th century, other than the addition of the three-storey tower in the 15th century. The church is Grade I listed.

A recess in the south wall contains a contemporary painting of Thomas Becket that was rediscovered in 1860.

== Village life ==
Hauxton had a 2011 population of 673 and has an organic food shop, a small convenience/grocery store and hair salon (both located on the ground floor of Mill View) and a church. The village had a sub-post office (housed in an annexe to a private house in High Street) and a small corner shop (known as "Arnold's") but these closed in the late 1980s and 1996 respectively. The corner shop's elderly proprietor, Meyrick Arnold, was one of Hauxton's most well-known and well-liked figures. He died in 1996 and is buried in the churchyard at Hauxton. Remarkably, his disused corner shop was left almost undisturbed for years afterwards, and a large jar filled with sweets was still displayed in the shop window as late as 2015. The former shop is now a private residence.

In addition to The Ship and The Chequers at Mill End (the latter of which closed between 1930 and 1960), Hauxton formerly had two public houses, The King's Head and The Leather Gaiters, which opened in the mid-19th century. The King's Head closed before 1961, and The Leather Gaiters followed soon after.

From the early 1970s until the building of Hauxton Meadows on the former Bayer CropScience site (see below), the village comprised four main roads:

- Church Road (which becomes High Street at its eastern end) is the main road through the village
- The Lane
- Jopling Way
- Willow Way

Hauxton Primary School is at the western end of Jopling Way.

The village achieved attention in 2010 when remediation of the former Bayer CropScience site became a source of concern over air pollution. The site had produced pesticides under the ownership of successive manufacturers until its closure. Remediation was undertaken by Vertase FLI, and monitored by South Cambridgeshire District Council and a number of national environmental protection bodies. These bodies concluded that the remediation process, although it generated unpleasant odours over a wide area, was essentially harmless to health. Nonetheless a protest group HauxAir was formed to campaign for either immediate cessation of the remediation process or a change in the techniques used.

== See also ==
- Hauxton Mill
