= Hubert Lamb =

British climatologist (1913–1997)

Hubert Lamb

Hubert Horace Lamb (22 September 1913 in Bedford – 28 June 1997 in Holt, Norfolk) was an English climatologist who founded the Climatic Research Unit in 1972 in the School of Environmental Sciences at the University of East Anglia.

== Career ==
Most of Lamb's scientific life was spent at the Meteorological Office, UK, where he started as a Technical Officer progressing by special merit promotion. As a Quaker and conscientious objector, Lamb refused to work on the meteorology of gas spraying during World War II, and was transferred to the Irish Meteorological Service, then still closely associated with the UK Met Office. On returning to the UK service after the war his responsibilities were in the fields of long range weather forecasting, world climatology and climate change. In this capacity he was assigned to West Germany and Malta. Earlier he was also posted as meteorological adviser on a Norwegian whaling factory ship to Antarctica. He became a member of the World Meteorological Organization's Working Group on Climate Fluctuations.

Lamb was one of the first to propose that climate could change within human experience, going against the orthodox view of the time that climate could be treated as constant for practical purposes. He developed early theories about the Medieval Warm Period and Little Ice Age. He became known for his prediction of gradual global cooling and a coming glacial period (colloquially an "ice age"), and he subsequently highlighted a more immediate future prospect of global warming.

=== Medieval warm epoch ===
In 1965 he published his study on "The early medieval warm epoch and its sequel", based on "data from the realms of botany, historical document research and meteorology". His view was that "Evidence has been accumulating in many fields of investigation pointing to a notably warm climate in many parts of the world, that lasted a few centuries around A.D. 1000–1200, and was followed by a decline of temperature levels till between 1500 and 1700 the coldest phase since the last ice age occurred." The paper included a series of diagrams of temperatures in central England over the period, simplified in a 1982 version adjusted to account for "probable under-reporting of mild winters in Medieval times" and "certain botanical considerations" including historical records of vineyards in southern and eastern England. This version was featured in the IPCC First Assessment Report of 1990, figure 7.1c on p. 202, as a "Schematic diagram of global temperature variations for the last thousand years."

=== Climatic Research Unit ===
In 1971 Lamb decided to base his pioneering research at a university, and he became the first director of the Climatic Research Unit established in 1972 in the School of Environmental Sciences at the University of East Anglia. In 1973 and 1975 he arranged for two international conferences which were hosted in Norwich. He was known as "the ice man" because of his view that global cooling would lead to a future glacial period within 10,000 years with some abrupt cooling phases occurring "within one to two thousand years". However he also acknowledged that global warming could have serious effects within a century. His warnings of damage to agriculture, ice caps melting, and cities being flooded caught widespread attention and helped to shape public opinion. He gained the unit sponsorship from seven major insurance companies, who wanted to make use of the research of the unit when making their own studies of the implications of climate change for insurance against storm and flood damage. He retired from the unit in 1978, and his contributions to the unit were recognised in 1981 when he was granted an honorary Doctorate of Science.

=== Abrupt climate change and global warming ===
Lamb's 1977 book Climatic History and the Future described studies of fossil pollen showing an abrupt change from a glacial era of pinewoods to oak trees, pointing to "great rapidity of climate change". He discussed research on the complex effects of human caused pollution, and suggested that "On balance, the effects of increased carbon dioxide on climate is almost certainly in the direction of warming but is probably much smaller than the estimates which have commonly been accepted."

In the preface to his 1984 edition of the book, Lamb noted studies of the "carbon dioxide problem" and called for more investigation of past climate, particularly "evidence that some major climatic changes took place surprisingly quickly." He outlined recent research suggesting that the next glaciation would begin in 3,000 to 7,000 years, and wrote "It is to be noted here that there is no necessary contradiction between forecast expectations of (a) some renewed (or continuation of) slight cooling of world climate for some years to come, e.g. from volcanic or solar activity variations; (b) an abrupt warming due to the effect of increasing carbon dioxide, lasting some centuries until fossil fuels are exhausted and a while thereafter; and this followed in turn by (c) a glaciation lasting (like the previous ones) for many thousands of years.”

== Awards ==
- 1974 - Murchison Award of the Royal Geographical Society, UK
- 1984 - Vega Medal of the Swedish Geographical Society
- 1986 - Symons Gold Medal of the Royal Meteorological Society
- 1997 - European Geophysical Society Honorary Membership

== Commemoration ==
In August 2006, the Climatic Research Unit Building in the School of Environmental Sciences at the University of East Anglia was renamed the Hubert Lamb Building. In the same year, Lamb was hailed as 'instrumental in establishing the study of climate change as a serious research subject' in a report listing the 'top 100 world-changing discoveries, innovations and research projects to come out of the UK universities in the last 50 years'.

In September 2013, the centenary of Lamb's birth was commemorated by a symposium at the University of East Anglia, co-organised with the Royal Meteorological Society.

== Family ==
Lamb was son of Ernest Horace Lamb (1878–1946), DSC, DSc, professor of engineering at Queen Mary College, London, and Lilian, daughter of the Rev. G. H. Brierley. He was a grandson of the mathematician Horace Lamb, whose influence he credited for his own early career at the Meteorological Office, and a nephew of the classicist Walter Lamb, the painter Henry Lamb and the archaeologist Dorothy Lamb. His son Norman Lamb was the Liberal Democrat MP for North Norfolk from 2001 until 2019.

== Books ==
- Climate, History and the Modern World (ISBN 0-415-12735-1)
- Climate Present Past and Future (ISBN 0-06-473881-7)

== See also ==
- Historical climatology
- Little Ice Age
- Alfred Thomas Grove
- Jean Grove
- Gordon Manley
