= Jean Grove =

English geographer (1927–2001)

Jean Mary Grove (née Clark; 10 March 1927 – 17 January 2001) was a British physical geographer and glaciologist known for her comprehensive study of climate change in the Little Ice Age across the world.

== Early life and education ==
Born Jean Mary Clark to Mary Johnson Clark, one of the first women chemists at Cambridge University, she grew up with a keen interest in science in a family that enjoyed mountaineering. Both her parents were scientists, and her younger sister Margaret Spufford became a notable historian of 16th- and 17th-century England. Jean Grove had tuberculosis as a child and for a year lived in a summer house in the garden. There she read widely, including books on exploration, geology and astronomy, and was taught by her mother. During the War the family moved to St Asaph, North Wales. Jean Grove attended Howell's School, Denbigh, where Marjorie Sweeting, later a Professor in the Geography Department at Oxford, was teaching. Marjorie Sweeting was a major influence and Jean decided to read geography at her mother's former College, Newnham.

She attended Newnham College and earned a degree in geography in 1948, then earned her Ph.D. in glaciology from Bedford College in 1956. She married a fellow Cambridge geographer, A. T. (Dick) Grove (1924–2023) in 1954, while completing her doctorate and working as a part-time lecturer, and had six children, the first, historian Richard Grove, in 1955 and the last in 1971.

== Career and research ==
She much enjoyed a Long Vacation field trip to the Jotunheim mountains of Norway, led by William Vaughan Lewis, Gordon Manley and Ronald Peel in 1947. Professor Frank Debenham, and Dr Jean Mitchell provided much encouragement and in the next three years Jean herself led small parties of students to Norway. Subsequently, she joined several University glaciological expeditions. The aim of the first of these in 1951, organised by Lewis and John McCall, an American research student, was for undergraduate labour to excavate a tunnel into Vesl-Skautbreen, a cirque glacier, to investigate its structure and flow characteristics. The effort was successful in reaching the headwall of the glacier and thereby provided graduates in geography, geology and mineralogy with the opportunity to make observations which laid the basis for post-war British glaciological research. Grove examined the banding on and in Veslskautbreen and Veslgjuvbreen and gained her PhD in 1956 for this work - 'A study of aspects of the physiography of certain glaciers in Norway'. She produced two chapters in the 'Investigations on Norwegian Cirque Glaciers' (Royal Geographical Society Research Series: number 4, 1960) edited by Lewis, which brought together this innovative work, and published three other papers on the nature of these glaciers.

From 1951-53 she lectured at Bedford College, London, under Gordon Manley. She was then appointed Director of Studies in Geography at Girton College and became a Fellow in 1960 and Emeritus in 1994. Jean Clark had met Dick Grove, newly appointed to the Geography Department. He assisted with the surveying in Norway. They married in 1954 and settled in Cambridge. In 1963, with their young family, they spent 6 months in Ghana teaching at Legon University. In a later retrospective account of their college days, some of the former students whom she had taught during her first decade at Girton wrote of her "[a]t a time in the early 1960s, when opportunities for most women beyond Cambridge were still limited, Jean Grove was our role model for a successful woman, showing that you could combine a professional life with marriage and young children".

Jean Grove's research continued to involve glaciers but increasingly it turned towards a subject, then somewhat neglected, namely historical climatology, following in the footsteps of Gordon Manley and Hubert Lamb. It was known that glaciers in the Alps had extended well beyond their present limits, leaving behind moraines dating from roughly 1600CE to 1900CE, the period known as the 'Little Ice Age'. Jean sought 'proxy' data for the instrumental climatic record in the Alps and elsewhere. She and Arthur Battagel, a relation by marriage, made use of the information about climatic and glacial damage to farmland in Norway provided by land tax records. It remained unclear whether the Little Ice Age was globally synchronous and so she proceeded to collect information from the field and from archives in many parts of the world. In 1988 her magnum opus, 'The Little Ice Age', was published (Methuen). This provided the first comprehensive study of the phenomenon. A second edition, edited by Dick Grove, was published in 2004.

Aside from her work on glaciology and climate variability, Grove published a series of papers arising from field research in the Volta Delta in Ghana in 1963 and 1966, at a time when the Volta dam project was being completed. With her then research student Sylvia Hewlett, Grove explored the development of an elaborate entirely indigenous system of irrigation and intensive cultivation of subsistence and cash crops by the Ewe people in the vicinity of Keta, largely maintained by women.

== The Jean Grove Trust ==
The Jean Grove Trust is a Roman Catholic charity named in her honour, and associated with Cambridge Blackfriars, of which Grove was an active lay member. It supports several schools in Ethiopia, and was founded in 1999 after a suggestion of hers to stay in touch with and aid some Ethiopian Catholic Church priests that had visited Blackfriars. Jean Grove's late husband Dick Grove was a trustee. The charity is also known as the Blackfriars Ethiopia Project. It has been supported by celebrities, politicians, and artists including Stephen Fry, Julian Fellowes, Jeffrey Archer, Tamsin Grieg, Clive James, Rowan Williams, and Lech Wałęsa.

== Honours and awards ==
- Fellow, Girton College, Cambridge (1979)

== Selected publications ==
- 1951, Clark, J. M. 'Rotational Movement in Cirque and Valley Glaciers', The Journal of Geology 59:6, 546-66
- 1951, Clark, J. M. 'The investigation of a possible method of cirque erosion', Publications of the International Association of Hydrological Sciences, 32. General Assembly of Brussells 1951, Volume 1, Snow and Ice, pp. 215-21
- 1960, Grove, J. M. 'A study of Veslgjuv-breen', in Investigations on Norwegian Cirque Glaciers, ed. W. Vaughan Lewis. Royal Geographical Society Research Series Research Series, 4. London: The Royal Geographical Society. Pp. 69-82
- 1966, Grove, J. M. 'Some aspects of the economy of the Volta Delta (Ghana)', Bulletin de l'Institut Fondamental d'Afrique Noire 28:1-2, 381-432
- 1988, Grove, J.M. The Little Ice Age. London; New York: Routledge
- 1994, Grove, J.M. and R. Switsur. 'Glacial geological evidence for the Medieval Warm Period'. Climatic Change, Vol.26 (2-3), pp.143-169
- 2004, Grove, J.M. Little Ice Ages: Ancient and Modern. 2 vols. London: Routledge
