= Gordon Manley =

British climatologist

Gordon Valentine Manley, FRGS (3 January 1902 – 29 January 1980) was a British climatologist who has been described as "probably the best known, most prolific and most expert on the climate of Britain of his generation". He assembled the Central England temperature (CET) series of monthly mean temperatures stretching back to 1659, which is the longest standardised instrumental record available for anywhere in the world. It provides a benchmark for proxy records of climatic change for the period covered, and is a notable example of scientific scholarship and perseverance (it took over thirty years to complete). His two papers describing the work are available online.

== Early life and career ==
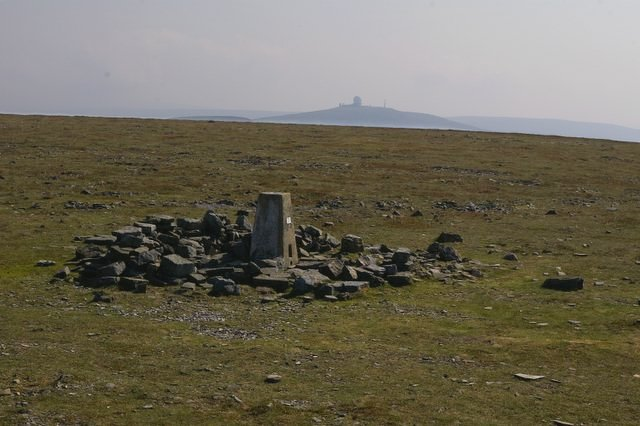
The summit of Cross Fell with Great Dun Fell and its radar station in the background. Both peaks are in Cumbria.

Gordon Manley was born at Douglas, Isle of Man. He was brought up in Blackburn, Lancashire, where he attended Queen Elizabeth's Grammar School. After obtaining degrees in engineering and geography at Victoria University of Manchester and Gonville and Caius College, Cambridge respectively, Manley joined the Meteorological Office in 1925, but resigned the following year. In the summer of 1926 he was a member of the Cambridge Expedition to East Greenland, which carried out much important research. Later that same year he began a lengthy career in academia when he became an assistant lecturer in geography at Birmingham University. His enthusiasm for his subject, his joy of learning and his wit made him an excellent teacher. In 1928 he was appointed a lecturer in geography at the University of Durham. He subsequently became a Senior Lecturer and founding Head of Department and Director of the University's Observatory.

He became Curator of Durham University Observatory in 1931, where he did much work on standardising the long temperature record that dated back to the mid-nineteenth century. The following year, he started collecting data at Moor House in the northern Pennines. He subsequently established a meteorological station close to the summit of Great Dun Fell at 847m, which recorded data at three-hour intervals from 1938 to 1940. This was the first series of mountain observations to be made in England.

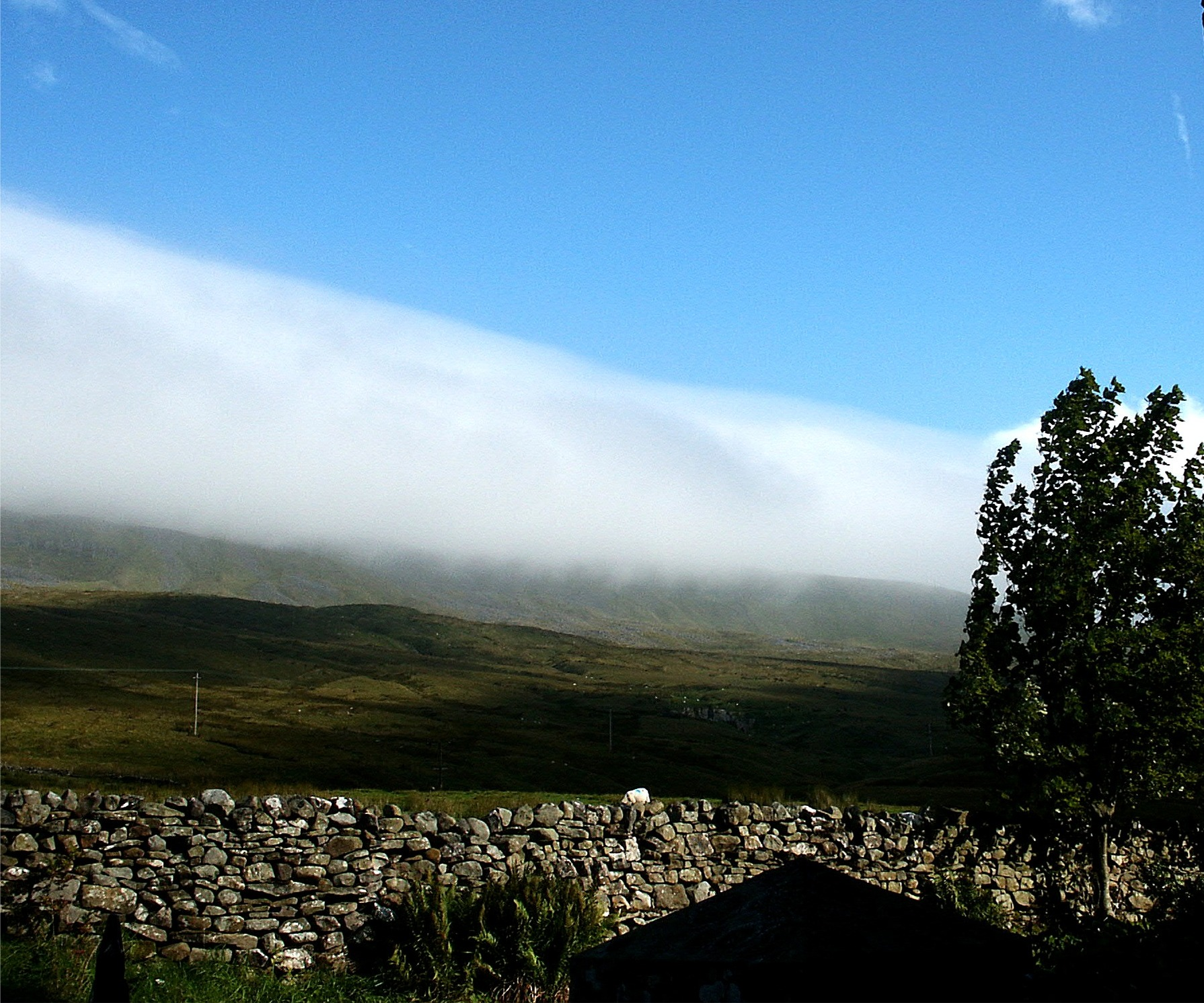
Helm Bar over Mallerstang Edge

=== Helm wind ===
From 1937 he carried out valuable research into the Helm Wind, a north-east wind that the local topography causes to blow down the south-west slope of Cross Fell in the Pennines with unusual strength. Manley interpreted the phenomenon in hydrodynamic terms as a standing wave and rotor, a model confirmed in 1939 by glider flights.

== Later career ==
In 1939 he left Durham to become a Demonstrator in Geography at Cambridge University. From 1942 to 1945 he was a Flight Lieutenant in Cambridge University Air Squadron, but he continued his research and teaching of students from Cambridge and Bedford College, London (the latter institution having been evacuated to Cambridge).

The Royal Meteorological Society's magazine Weather, whose objective was (and still is) to make developments in meteorology accessible to a wider public, started in 1946 during his presidency and benefited from his encouragement.

From 1948 to 1964, Manley was professor of geography at Bedford College for Women in the University of London. He maintained his links with Cambridge, one result being the joint participation of undergraduates from both institutions in expeditions to Norway and Iceland.

In 1952 Collins published his Climate and the British Scene in their New Naturalist series. This book, easily accessible to the non-academic reader, was one of his greatest contributions to British climatology. His flair for writing entertainingly as well as informatively about the climate helped him to write a long series of articles for the Manchester Guardian from 1952 onwards about weather and climate events that were of topical interest.

In 1964, at the age of 62, he took on the challenge of founding the new department of Environmental Studies at the equally new Lancaster University. In 1967 he retired and moved back to Cambridge, but he remained a Research Associate. During this period, his research on Manchester rainfall and on Central England temperatures was finally published. The Central England temperature series continues to be updated each month by the UK Meteorological Office.

During 1969–70 he was a Visiting Professor of Meteorology at Texas A&M University. For the rest of his life he continued working and publishing. In all he wrote 182 papers from 1927 onwards. At the time of his death he was assembling instrumental data for the north of England and Scotland back to the 18th century.

He is buried in Coton churchyard.

== Books and selected papers ==
Note: The second and third items are those referred to in the footnote above and are available online. They are large PDF files.

- Manley, Gordon. Climate and the British Scene: New Naturalist No. 22 (1st edition), Collins, 1952.
- Manley, G., "The mean temperature of central England, 1698–1952." Quarterly Journal of the Royal Meteorological Society, vol. 79, pp. 242–261 (1953).
- Manley, G., "Central England temperatures: monthly means 1659 to 1973", Quarterly Journal of the Royal Meteorological Society, vol. 100, pp. 389–405 (1974).

== Awards and achievements ==
- BSc(Hons) in engineering, Manchester University (1921)
- BA (later MA Cantab) in geography (double first), Gonville and Caius College, Cambridge (1923)
- Appointed Fellow of the Royal Geographical Society (1927)
- Appointed Fellow of the Royal Meteorological Society (1932)
- MSc (external candidate), Manchester University (1938)
- Buchan Prize of the Royal Meteorological Society (jointly with Dr TEW Schuman) (1943)
- Gave the GJ Symons Memorial Lecture (1944)
- President of the Royal Meteorological Society (1945–47)
- Awarded the Murchison Grant of the Royal Geographical Society (1947)
- Member of the council of the Royal Geographical Society (1952–54)
- DSc, Manchester University (1958)
- Made Honorary Fellow of the Royal Meteorological Society (1976)
- DSc honoris causa, Durham University (1979)
- On 22 May 2007, the Gordon_Manley Building, (LEC III), named in his honour, was opened at the Lancaster Environment Centre by Lord Rees of Ludlow Kt.

== See also ==
- Historical climatology
- Little Ice Age
- Alfred Thomas Grove
- Jean Grove
- Hubert Lamb
