= Richard Grove =

British historian (1955–2020)

Richard H. Grove
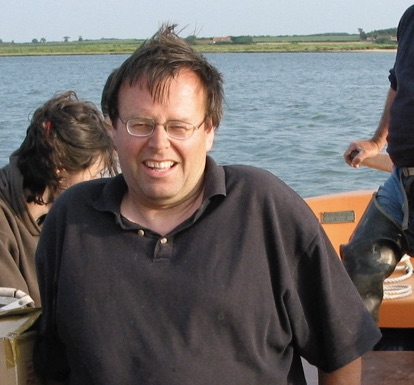
- Grove at Scolt Head Island, North Norfolk, in 2003
- Born: 21 July 1955; Cambridge, England
- Died: 25 June 2020 (aged 64)
- Citizenship: British
- Education: University of Oxford; University College London; University of Cambridge
- Known for: Green Imperialism (1995)
- Spouse: Vinita Damodaran
- Scientific career
- Fields: Environmental history
- Workplaces: Australian National University, University of Sussex
- Thesis: Conservation and colonial expansion: a study of the evolution of environmental attitudes and conservation policies on St Helena, Mauritius and in India, 1660–1860 (1988)
- Website: www.sussex.ac.uk/cweh/people/richardgrove

Richard Hugh Grove (21 July 1955 – 25 June 2020) was a British historian, environmental activist, and one of the contemporary founders of environmental history as an academic field. His prizewinning book, Green Imperialism: Colonial Expansion, Tropical Island Edens and the Origins of Environmentalism 1600–1860 (1995), was considered a pioneering account of colonial environmental impacts and an origin for early western ideas on environmentalism.

== Life and work ==
Grove was the son of Cambridge climatologists Alfred Thomas Grove (who known as Dick and consequently often confused with his son Richard) and Jean Mary Grove, née Clark. He was married to historian Vinita Damodaran of the University of Sussex. Educated at the Perse School, Cambridge, his interdisciplinary training included a BA in geography from Hertford College, Oxford (1979), MSc in Conservation biology from University College London (1980) and a PhD in history from the University of Cambridge (1988).

Grove was a Fellow of Clare Hall, and College Lecturer at Churchill College, University of Cambridge (1988–1990 and 1991–1992). He also held visiting appointments at the Institute of Advanced Studies of the Australian National University in Canberra and the Program in Agrarian Studies at Yale University. He spent a year at the Woodrow Wilson Center for International Scholars in Washington DC in the 1990s.

Grove became Professor and founded the Centre for World Environmental History at the University of Sussex in May 2002. He received a five-year research appointment at the Australian National University in 2006, funded by an ARC Discovery fellowship, but was unable to complete it. In 2006, Grove suffered a very serious car accident in Cooma, Australia, on his way back from the Manning Clark property "Ness" on the far south coast of New South Wales, and had been severely incapacitated from that time.

== Academic contributions ==
Grove published his first book at the age of 21 on The Cambridgeshire Coprolite Mining Rush. He contributed to knowledge of the political, environmental and economic history of India, Pakistan, Sri Lanka, Mauritius and other Indian Ocean islands, Malawi, Ghana, Nigeria, the Southern Caribbean (especially St Vincent, Montserrat, Dominica and Tobago), Australia and New Zealand. His major contribution has been to document the environmental history of these places through exhaustive archival research in several languages, particularly relating to the 17th–19th centuries. The ecological transformations of island terrains around the world received particular attention. He argued that some important figures in the tropics actually helped to create early environmentalist thought in the British colonies. Plant transfers by colonial actors were very significant, and helped create environmental awareness among imperial powers. His major argument is summarised in The Culture of Islands and the History of Environmental Concern, a paper presented at the Harvard Seminar on Environmental Values, in 2000.

A more recent strand of investigation concerned the historical impact of El Nino events. His 2000 book with Australian geologist, John Chappell, documented the local effects of the disastrous 1997–1998 El Nino in Papua New Guinea and Indonesia.

Grove founded the academic journal, Environment and History.

A festschrift volume, The British Empire and the natural world: environmental encounters in South Asia, edited by Deepak Kumar, Vinita Damadaran, and Rohan D'Souza, was published by Oxford University Press in 2011. The volume recognises Grove's substantial contribution to environmental history before his accident.

== Key publications ==
- Anderson, D., and Grove, R.H. (eds.) 1987. Conservation in Africa: people, policies and practices. Cambridge University Press.
- Grove, R.H. 1992. Origins of Western Environmentalism. Scientific American 267 (1): 42–47. doi:10.1038/scientificamerican0792-42.
- Grove, R.H. 1995. Green Imperialism: Colonial Expansion, Tropical Island Edens and the Origins of Environmentalism 1600–1860. Cambridge University Press. ISBN 0-521-40385-5
- Grove, R.H., and J. MacGregor (eds.) 1995. Environment and History: Zimbabwe. Cambridge: White Horse Press.
- Grove, R.H. 1997. Ecology, Climate and Empire: Colonialism and Global Environmental History, 1400–1940. Cambridge: White Horse Press. ISBN 1-874267-18-9
- Grove, R.H., V. Damodaran, and S. Sangwan (eds.) 1998. Nature & the Orient: The Environmental History of South and Southeast Asia. Oxford University Press. ISBN 0195638964
- Grove, R.H., and J Chappell. 2000. El Nino: History and Crisis: Studies from the Asia-Pacific Region. Cambridge: White Horse Press.
- Grove, R.H. 2007. The Great El Niño of 1789–93 and its global consequences : Reconstructing an extreme climatic event in world environmental history. The Medieval History Journal 10: 43–66.
- Grove, R.H., and Adamson, George 2018. El Niño in World History. Palgrave. ISBN 9781137457394
