= Newton, South Cambridgeshire =

Village in Cambridgeshire, England

Coordinates: 52.12474°N 0.09924°E

Newton
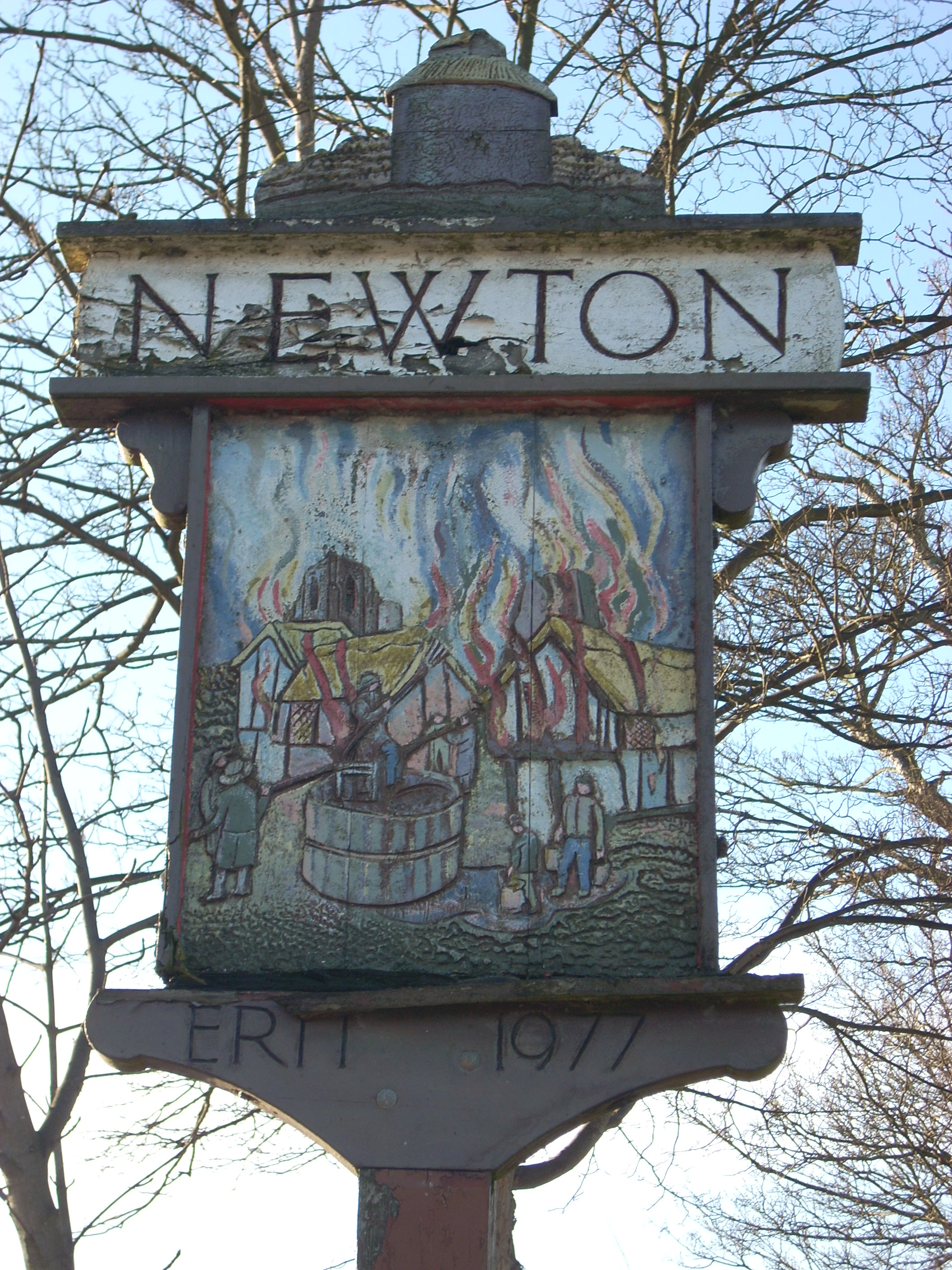
- Village sign

- Location within Cambridgeshire
- Population: 378 (2011)
- OS grid reference: TL435495
- District: South Cambridgeshire
- Shire county: Cambridgeshire
- Region: East
- Country: England
- Sovereign state: United Kingdom
- Post town: CAMBRIDGE
- Postcode district: CB22
- Dialling code: 01223
- Police: Cambridgeshire
- Fire: Cambridgeshire
- Ambulance: East of England

Newton is a civil parish and small village in Cambridgeshire, England. Situated around 7 miles to the south-west of Cambridge, it lies on the old coaching road between London and Cambridge. Its population in 2001 was 401, falling to 378 at the 2011 Census.

== History ==
The history of Newton has long been tied to that of neighbouring Hauxton; they were ruled by a single manor, were a single civil parish until the 16th century and until 1930 formed a single ecclesiastical parish. There were disputes over the parish boundaries with Harston and Little Shelford until they were finally settled in 1800, when the parish of Newton was set at 402 hectares.

In 970 the land around Newton and Hauxton was passed to King Edgar who offered them to Bishop Aethelwold for the new Abbey at Ely. However, Edgar died before the lands were transferred and the lands were subject to a series of disputes until they were purchased for the Abbey.

At the time of the Domesday Book the lands in modern Newton fell under the manor at Hauxton and both villages remained the property of Ely Abbey until the Dissolution of the Monasteries in 1539. Since then the manor has been owned by the Hurrell family.

The village of Newton itself built up around the intersection of the five roads from Harston, Hauxton, Whittlesford, Thriplow and Foxton. It has always been a small village, and in 1801 was home to only 114 people. In 1746 much of the village was destroyed by a fire. The village's economy has always been dominated by farming.

There are 31 listed buildings and monuments in the village.

== Church ==
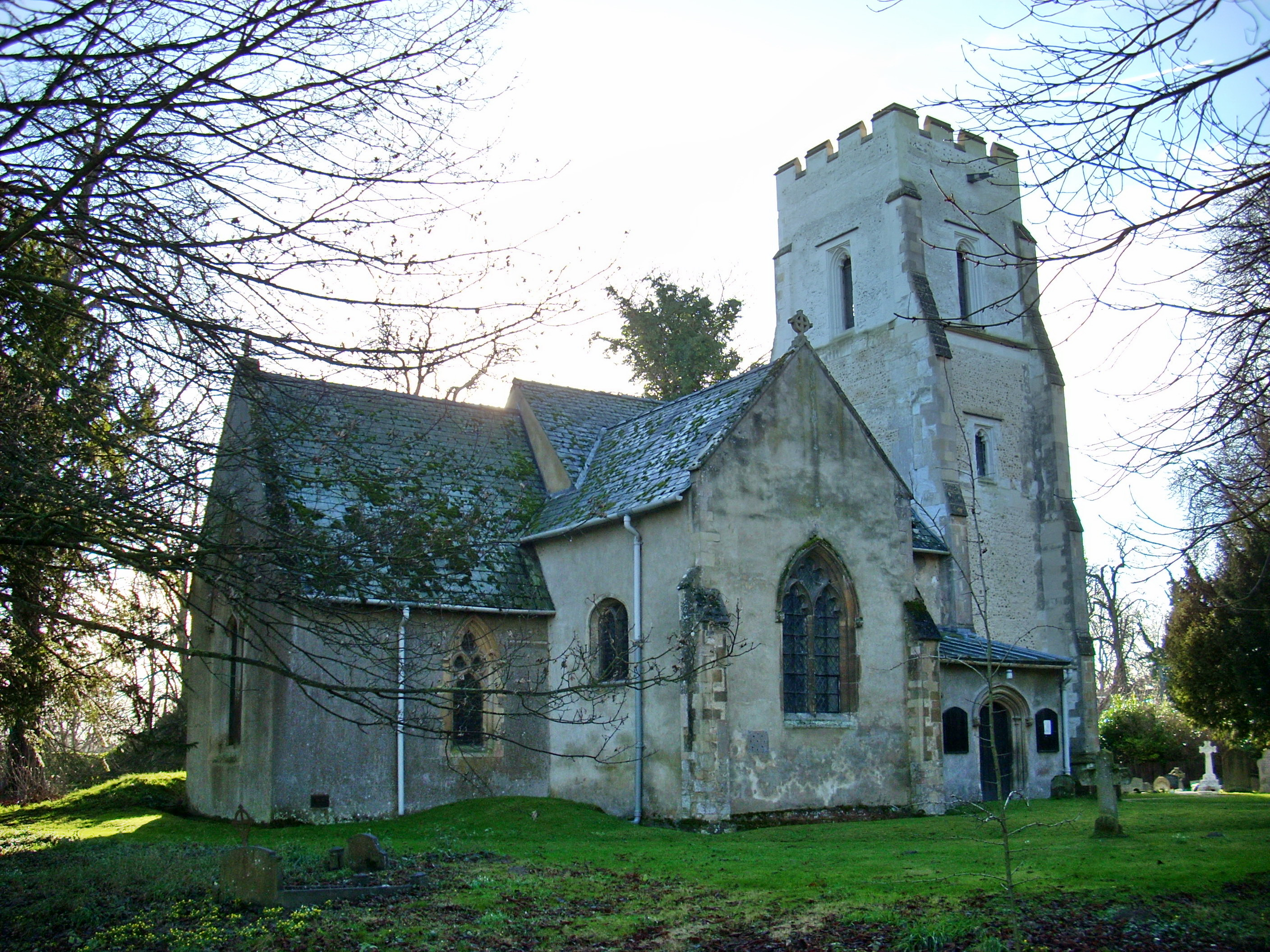
Church of St Margaret

There has been a small church in the village for at least a thousand years and the present church had long been in use as a chapel when it was finally consecrated in 1346. The church was dedicated to St James until the 18th century when it was dedicated to Saint Margaret.

The oldest parts of the present building date from the early 13th century, including its octagonal font. The church was substantially restored in 1851.

== Village life ==
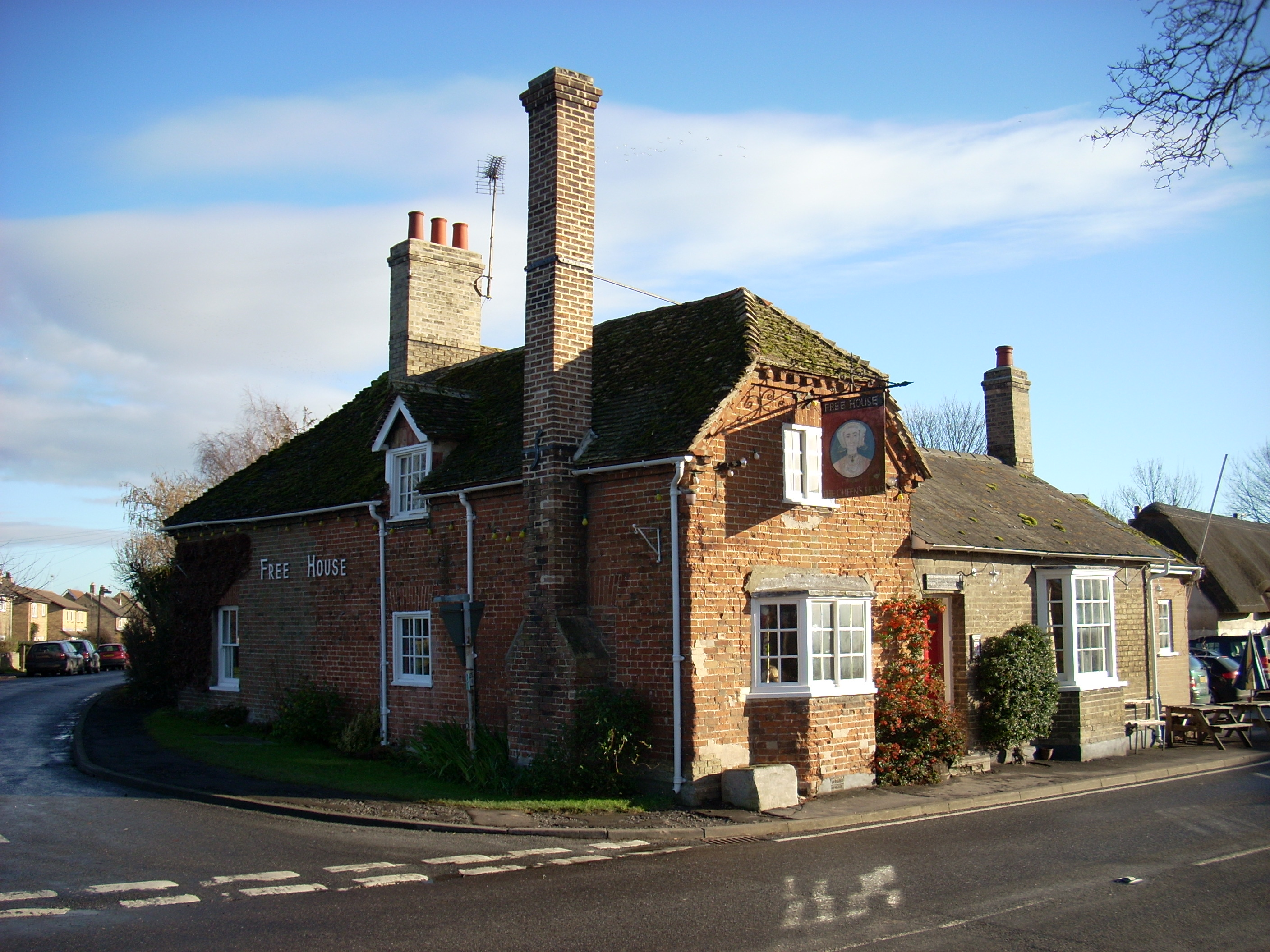
The Queen's Head

The village is home to the Queen's Head public house, which has been open since at least 1729. The pub is one of very few to have appeared in every edition of the Good Beer Guide since it started in the 1970s and in 2021 received a Golden Award from CAMRA, one of only 32 pubs. Its sign depicts Anne of Cleves.

The village no longer has a post office as it was converted to a house in 2007.

== See also ==
- List of places in Cambridgeshire
