= Queen's Head, Newton =

Listed pub in Cambridgeshire, England

Queen's Head
- The pub in 2018

General information
- Type: Public house
- Location: Fowlmere Road, Newton, South Cambridgeshire, England
- Coordinates: 52°07′28″N 0°05′58″E
- Year built: Early 18th century
- Renovated: Late 18th century (extended); 19th and 20th century (altered)
- Owner: Independent

Design and construction
- Designations

Listed Building – Grade II
- Official name: The Queens Head public house
- Designated: 29 August 1984
- Reference no.: 1165055

Website
- queensheadnewton.co.uk

The Queen's Head is a Grade II listed public house on Fowlmere Road in Newton, South Cambridgeshire, England. Dating from the early 18th century and enlarged in later centuries, it has been recorded as a pub since at least 1729. The pub retains a historic interior recognised by the Campaign for Real Ale (CAMRA), which has awarded it a three-star rating on its National Inventory of Historic Pub Interiors. It has appeared in every edition of the Good Beer Guide since 1974, one of only five pubs to have done so.

== History ==
The building is an early 18th-century public house that was extended later in the 18th century, and further altered during the 19th and 20th centuries. The pub has been recorded since at least 1729. According to the Campaign for Real Ale (CAMRA), only 18 landlords are known to have held the tenancy since that date.

An 1802 description refers to the property as the "Queens Head" together with a cottage, outbuildings, stables, yard, garden and orchard. In 1827, the licensee Edward Ashby was evicted after failing to pay rent, and an inventory of the premises and its contents was compiled. By 1828, the pub provided stabling for five horses, reflecting its location on the turnpike road between Ware and Cambridge. Records of extensive repairs carried out in 1834 also survive. By the late 19th century, a cottage within the pub yard housed the village library.

The pub was acquired by Harry and Ruth Short in 1962 after a period of closure and a planned demolition. It subsequently remained in the ownership of the Short family, with later generations continuing to operate the business. It has appeared in every edition of the Good Beer Guide since 1974, one of only five pubs to have done so.

On 29 August 1984, the Queen's Head was designated a Grade II listed building. CAMRA considers its interior to be of "outstanding national historic importance" and has awarded it a three-star rating on its National Inventory of Historic Pub Interiors. The pub was included on CAMRA's Regional Inventory of Historic Pub Interiors for East Anglia and is featured in its regional guide Real Heritage Pubs: East of England. In 2021 it received a CAMRA Golden Award, an accolade awarded to 32 pubs.

== Architecture ==
=== Exterior ===
The building is constructed of red brick and has a tiled roof with a later chimney stack. It consists of two main ranges forming an L-shaped plan. The earlier range, dating from the early 18th century, faces the road and has two storeys, with a bay window at ground-floor level and a horizontally sliding sash window above. The adjoining range was added later in the 18th century and is also of two storeys. A single-storey extension of grey brick was added in the early 19th century within the angle of the two ranges, and includes a canted bay window. The pub sign depicts Anne of Cleves.

=== Interior ===
The interior retains a traditional multi-room layout. A short entrance passage leads to a jug-and-bottle hatch with its original window and bell push. The public bar retains quarry-tiled flooring, dado panelling, bench seating, a fireplace with a timber surround, and a high-backed settle. Opposite, the lounge bar occupies a space that was formerly divided into two rooms and incorporates features added during a remodelling in the early 1960s, including a brick bar counter inset with bottles and timber wall panelling. A games annexe and new toilet facilities were added in 1963.
