= Peter Spufford =

British historian and academic

- Born: 18 August 1934
- Died: 18 November 2017 (aged 83)
- Spouse: Margaret (m. 1962; died 2014)
- Children: 2, including Francis

Academic background
- Education: Jesus College, Cambridge

Academic work
- Discipline: History
- Sub-discipline: European history; Medieval Europe; Numismatics
- Institutions: Jesus College, Cambridge; Keele University; Queens' College, Cambridge; Faculty of History, University of Cambridge

Peter Spufford, FSA, FRHistS, FBA (18 August 1934 – 18 November 2017) was a British historian and academic, specialising in the economics of Medieval Europe. He was Professor Emeritus of European History at the University of Cambridge.

== Early life and education ==
Spufford was born on 18 August 1934. He was educated at Kingswood School, a private school in Bath, Somerset. He studied at Jesus College, Cambridge, graduating with a Bachelor of Arts (BA) degree in 1956 and a Doctor of Philosophy (PhD) degree in 1963.

== Academic career ==
Spufford began his academic career as a research fellow of Jesus College, Cambridge from 1958 to 1960. He then moved to the University of Keele, where he rose through the ranks from assistant lecturer to lecturer to senior lecturer, and finally to reader, between 1960 and 1979.

In 1979, Spufford returned to the University of Cambridge, having been elected a Fellow of Queens' College, Cambridge. He additionally held positions in the Faculty of History, University of Cambridge: he was a university lecturer from 1979 to 1990, Reader in Economic History from 1990 to 2000, and Professor of European History from 2000 to 2001. He retired from full-time academia in 2001 and was appointed Emeritus Fellow of Queens' College.

His intellectual legacy consists of a trio of highly influential books: Money and Its Uses in Medieval Europe (1988), a groundbreaking study of the role of coined money and credit in the working of the medieval economy; the Handbook of Medieval Exchange (1986), a reference work gathering up all of the then-known data on the rates at which currencies in medieval western Europe were exchanged, across the period; and Power and Profit: The Merchant in Medieval Europe (2003), an illustrated study of medieval trade routes, banking, merchant life and commodity trading. While all three books have shaped the academic study of the medieval economy, the third also found an enthusiastic audience among general readers – and as a resource for fantasy novelists including Daniel Abraham and Guy Gavriel Kay.

Spufford joined the Society of Genealogists in 1955, became a Fellow of the Society in 1969, and served as its Vice-President from 1997 to 2012. He edited the Society's journal from 1961 to 1963.

He was also President of the Cambridge University Heraldic and Genealogical Society for the 1959/1960 academic year and later served as Vice-President.

== Personal life ==
Spufford was married to Professor Margaret Spufford (née Clark; 1935–2014) who was a British academic and historian. They had two children; a son, Francis, and a daughter, Bridget, who pre-deceased them; Bridget is well remembered by Bridget's Hostel for disabled students in Cambridge.

Spufford died on 18 November 2017. His funeral was held on 24 November at the Church of St Mary and St Andrew, Whittlesford, Cambridgeshire.

== Honours ==
In 1968, Spufford was elected Fellow of the Royal Historical Society (FRHistS). The following year he became a Fellow of the Society of Genealogists (FSG). On 11 January 1990, he was elected Fellow of the Society of Antiquaries (FSA). In 1994, he was elected Fellow of the British Academy (FBA). In 2005, he was awarded the Medal of the Royal Numismatic Society in 2005.

== See also ==
- Académie Belgo-Espagnole d'Histoire
