= Jean Mitchell (geographer) =

English geographer

Jean Brown Mitchell (1904–1990) was an English academic and geographer.

Jean Brown Mitchell was born on 26 July 1904 in Manchester. She was raised in Cheshire and attended Macclesfield High School. Her family had a farm in Galloway which she would return to during vacations.

She enrolled at Newnham College, Cambridge studying her B.A. from 1923 to 1926. Her chief interest was geography, under the direction of Frank Debenham, who had helped to establish the discipline at Cambridge. She earned a double First Class in the Geography Tripos Part I in 1924, and Part II in 1926. She earned a scholarship from 1924 to 1926. Mitchell completed her M.A. in 1931.

== Career ==
Mitchell took a junior lecturing position at Bedford College from 1926 to 1930. She returned to Newnham College in 1931, as a Research Fellow from 1931 to 1934, and then became a lecturer in geography from 1934 to 1968. She would be Director of Geographical Studies 1933–1968, in addition to archaeology and anthropology studies 1954–1957, and architecture studies 1953–1968.

During World War II, Mitchell wrote parts of the Naval Intelligence Division Geographical Handbooks, especially those that related to Greece. She also taught army and naval staff.

She returned to teaching at Cambridge following the war, helping to develop physical and historical geography study at the university. Suffering from poor health for most of her life, she often taught classes in her rooms, when she was confined to bed.

Mitchell led excursions to East Anglia and Leicestershire in the 1960s, where she lectured on mediaeval church architecture.

== Published works ==
- Historical geography (1954)
- Mitchell edited Great Britain: geographical essays (1962).

== Memberships ==
Mitchell joined the Royal Geographical Society in 1926, and served on its council from 1952 to 1955, and 1958 to 1961. She was a member of the Royal Scottish Geographical Society from 1945 and was made a Fellow of the same in 1983.

== Legacy ==
Mitchell was most known for her work as a teacher at Cambridge for more than 40 years.

She retired to Edinburgh, but continued to serve as an external examiner in geography at Oxford University.

She died on 5 January 1990 in Edinburgh.

The Jean Mitchell Award was funded by monies collected in her honour, after her retirement in 1968.
