= Margaret Spufford =

British social historian (1935–2014)

Professor Margaret Spufford OBE FBA
- Born: Honor Margaret Clark; 10 December 1935; Cheshire, England
- Died: 6 March 2014 (aged 78)
- Title: Professor of Social and Local History
- Spouse: Peter Spufford (m. 1962)
- Children: Two, including Francis Spufford

Academic background
- Education: Cambridge High School for Girls
- Alma mater: Newnham College, Cambridge; University of Leicester
- Thesis: People, Land & Literacy in Cambridgeshire in the 16th & 17th Centuries (1970)

Academic work
- Discipline: History
- Institutions: Lucy Cavendish College, Cambridge; Keele University; Newnham College, Cambridge; Netherlands Institute for Advanced Study; University of Roehampton; Japan Academy

Honor Margaret Spufford, OBE, FBA (née Clark; 10 December 1935 – 6 March 2014), known as Margaret Spufford, was a British academic and historian. She was Professor of Social and Local History at the University of Roehampton from 1994 to 2001.

== Early life ==
Spufford was born Honor Margaret Clark in Cheshire on 10 December 1935. Her parents, Mary (née Johnson) and Leslie Marshall Clark, were scientists. Her older sister Jean Grove was a glaciologist. During her childhood, Margaret was educated at home by her mother. During World War II, she lived in the Welsh borders to be safer from the threat of bombing. In 1953, with the death of her father, the family moved to Cambridge. There, she attended the sixth form of Cambridge High School for Girls, a grammar school.

In 1956, she matriculated into Newnham College, a women-only constituent college of the University of Cambridge. Due to ill health she left university without completing her degree. For all her adult life she suffered from early onset osteoporosis. Although her first fracture was at the age of 17, the disease was not diagnosed until she was 31. She later returned to university and studied in the Department for English Local History at the University of Leicester. She graduated in 1963 with a Master of Arts (MA) degree, having achieved a distinction. She remained to complete post-graduate research and completed her Doctor of Philosophy (PhD) degree in 1970. Her thesis was titled People, Land & Literacy in Cambridgeshire in the 16th & 17th Centuries.

== Academic career ==
Spufford began her academic career as a research fellow at Lucy Cavendish College, Cambridge, in 1969. After three years at the University of Cambridge, she joined Keele University as an honorary lecturer and senior research fellow where she stayed for the rest of the 1970s. In 1980, she returned to Newnham College, Cambridge as a fellow and college lecturer in history. She was initially also a senior research associate at the History faculty. In 1985, she gave up her official Fellowship and was appointed a bye-fellow because her blood pressure became labile, which meant she could no longer commit herself to continue teaching undergraduates on a regular basis. She continued teaching a large group of doctoral students, who called themselves 'The Spuffordians' and came to her from as far away as Canada, California, Australia and Japan because of her reputation, based on her publications. After a year at the Netherlands Institute for Advanced Study in Wassenaar, she was appointed Research Professor in Social and Local History at the University of Roehampton in 1994. She retired in 2001. She spent two terms in Japan, the second as guest of the Japan Academy, overseeing a cooperative research project on local history in Japan. The resulting publication of a series of volumes, is currently (March 2015) in progress.

== Publications ==
Spufford started publishing in 1960 and had already published two smaller books and ten articles before her most influential book Contrasting Communities was published in 1974. It has been kept continuously in print ever since. It changed the way that historians looked at local communities in early modern England.

Her next important book, Small Books and Pleasant Histories: Popular Fiction and its Readership in Seventeenth Century England, was published in 1981 and it too has been kept continuously in print ever since It made people aware of the extent of literacy in rural England and what there was for rural readers to read. As a consequence it brought to the attention of historians of English literature the immense quantity of ephemeral literature that underpinned the literary canon. She later extended her work on education and literacy from rural England to other parts of Europe.

Her next landmark book, The Great Reclothing of Rural England, came out in 1984. It brought the attention of historians to the chapmen who toured rural England before the proliferation of shops, carrying with them the essential linens for clothing and a range of haberdashery and other small objects, including small books. This has produced similar studies in other parts of Europe.

Spufford's next book, The World of Rural Dissenters, 1520-1725, was published in 1995. It was an attempt with a number of her research students to look at the continuity and social range of dissent in rural England from the Lollards to the early 18th century. She herself contributed an introductory chapter, a small book in itself, summarising her particular views on the importance of religion in the 16th and 17th centuries.

Her Poverty Portrayed also appeared in 1995. It tied together documents about rural poverty with paintings by the two Egbert van Heemskercks, father and son, portraying rural society in Holland and England.

In 1995, she began the British Academy Hearth Tax project, at the University of Roehampton, which launched a series of edited texts, with critical introductions of the hearth tax records of late 17th century England.

In 2000 many of her articles were republished in Figures in the Landscape, Rural Society in England 1500-1700.

== Later life ==
Spufford was a profoundly religious person and became an oblate of the Anglican Benedictine Malling Abbey in West Malling. She wrote a notable book, Celebration, on the problem of pain and Christian belief, out of her own experience and that of her daughter. Television and radio programmes resulted and she was frequently asked to preach, mostly in the Cambridge area, including leading Good Friday meditations, to speak at Diocesan clergy gatherings, to Ordinands, and to trainee doctors and nurses. She also set up a hostel for students who were so disabled that they would not otherwise have been able to come to university. Spufford died on 6 March 2014. Her funeral was held on 29 March at the Whittlesford parish church.

== Personal life ==
In 1962, she married Peter Spufford. Together they had two children; a son, Francis, and a daughter, Bridget, who pre-deceased her.

=== Health issues ===
Spufford had struggled with physical health issues for all her adult life. While in her 30s, early onset osteoporosis was diagnosed. She also survived cancer and high and labile blood pressure. She was diagnosed with vascular dementia and Lewy bodies dementia in autumn 2011. She then became too ill to complete the revision of her Clothing of the Common Sort which was prepared for publication by her co-author, Dr Susan Mee, the last of her many research students. It was published in January 2018 in the Pasold Studies in Textiles Series by the Oxford University Press.

== Honours ==
Spufford was awarded a higher doctorate, Doctor of Letters (LittD), by the University of Cambridge in 1986. In 1995, she was elected Fellow of the British Academy (FBA). In the 1996 New Year Honours, she was appointed Officer of the Order of the British Empire (OBE) 'For services to Social History and to Higher Education for People with Disabilities'. She was given Honorary Doctorates by the Open University and the University of Keele. Her former pupils and colleagues are organising a conference in her honour in June 2015, as well as a concert in April 2015. A Prize Fund has also been set up in her memory.

In 2018 a festschrift was published in her honour: Trevor Dean, Glyn Parry, Edward Vallance, eds. Faith, Place and People in Early Modern England: Essays in Honour of Margaret Spufford. Woodbridge, Suffolk: Boydell Press, 2018., ISBN 978-1-78327-290-7.
