= Alayne Street-Perrott =

British climatologist

- Born: Nantgaredig, Wales, United Kingdom
- Education: University of Cambridge
- Scientific career
- Workplaces: Swansea University
- Thesis: Late Quaternary lakes in the Ziway-Shala Basin, Southern Ethiopia (1979)

Alayne Street-Perrott is a British climatologist and Emeritus Professor at Swansea University. She is from Nantgaredig, Wales, United Kingdom. She specializes in paleoclimatology, paleolimnology, tropical palaeoenvironments, and long-term changes in the tropics' carbon cycle.

== Education and career ==
Street-Perrott received her bachelor's honours degree from the University of Cambridge. She then attended the University of Colorado Boulder, where she earned her M.A. She returned to Cambridge to complete her Ph.D.

After completing her master's program, she became a visiting scholar at Addis Ababa University. From October 1976 to September 1980, she served as a departmental demonstrator at Oxford University. She became a lecturer there from October 1980 to December 1995. During this period, she was also elected a fellow of St Hilda's College, and in 1995 was named a Supernumerary Fellow.

From January 1995 to October 2016, Street-Perrott was a research professor at Swansea University and was appointed Emeritus Professor in October 2016.

== Research ==
Street-Perrott began studying changes in lake levels as a graduate student in Ethiopia. She then collaborated with Sarah L. O'Hara in Mexico to quantify the impacts of human activity on the environment.

During the 1980s and 1990s, she investigated changes in lake levels and their connections to the movement of freshwater into the Atlantic Ocean. Her subsequent research focused on how tropical lakes are linked to carbon cycling during the Quaternary period.

== Honors and awards ==
In 2015, she received a lifetime achievement award from the International Paleolimnological Association, and the United Kingdom's Quaternary Research Association awarded her the James Croll Medal, their highest honour. In 2017, she was named a Fellow of the Learned Society of Wales. Street-Perrott was also recognised as a Chartered Geographer and Fellow of the Royal Geographical Society.

In 2016, a special issue of the Journal of Quaternary Science was published, containing a collection of papers in honour of her work.

== Selected publications ==
- Kutzbach, John E.; Street-Perrott, F. Alayne (September 1985). "Milankovitch forcing of fluctuations in the level of tropical lakes from 18 to 0 kyr BP". Nature. 317 (6033): 130–134. doi:10.1038/317130a0. ISSN 1476-4687.
- COHMAP Members (26 August 1988). "Climatic changes of the last 18,000 years: observations and model simulations". Science. 241 (4869): 1043–1052. doi:10.1126/science.241.4869.1043.
- Street-Perrott, F. Alayne; Perrott, R. Alan (February 1990). "Abrupt climate fluctuations in the tropics: the influence of Atlantic Ocean circulation". Nature. 343 (6259): 607–612. doi:10.1038/343607a0. ISSN 1476-4687.
- Woolf, Dominic; Amonette, James E.; Street-Perrott, F. Alayne; Lehmann, Johannes; Joseph, Stephen (10 August 2010). "Sustainable biochar to mitigate global climate change". Nature Communications. 1 (1): 56. doi:10.1038/ncomms1053. ISSN 2041-1723. PMC 2964457.
- Cockerton, Helen E.; Street-Perrott, F. Alayne; Barker, Philip A.; Leng, Melanie J.; Sloane, Hilary J.; Ficken, Katherine J. (2015). "Orbital forcing of glacial/interglacial variations in chemical weathering and silicon cycling within the upper White Nile basin, East Africa: Stable-isotope and biomarker evidence from Lakes Victoria and Edward". Quaternary Science Reviews. 130: 57–71. doi:10.1016/j.quascirev.2015.07.028.
