= Gary Metcalf =

American academic and management consultant

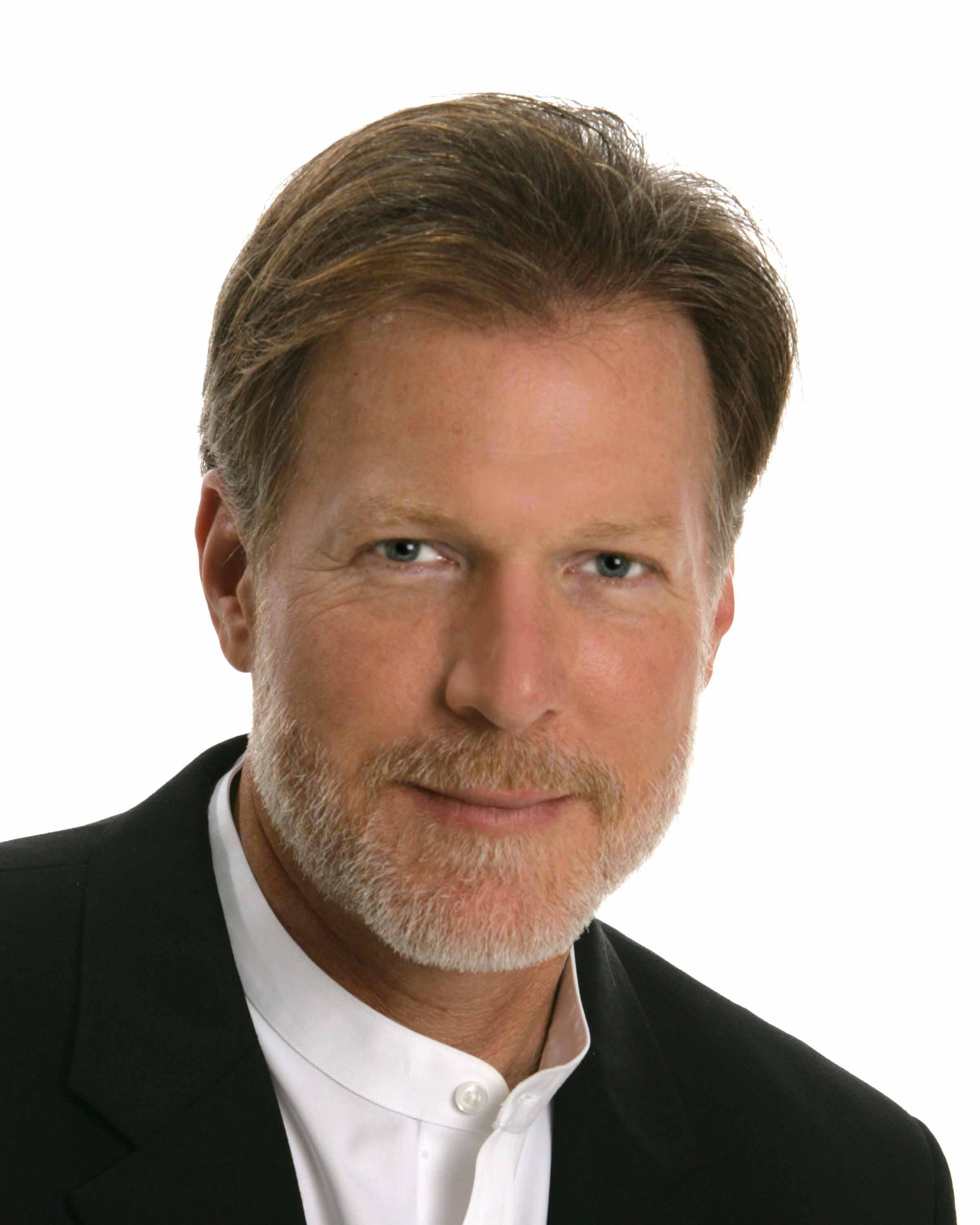
Gary Metcalf, 2007.

Gary S. Metcalf (born 1957) is an American systems scientist, organizational theorist, management consultant, and university professor. He has served as president of the International Federation for Systems Research 2010-2014.

== Biography ==
Raised in Oviedo, Florida, Metcalf received a B.S. in Education in 1981 from the North Texas State University, an M.S.S.W. in Social Work in 1985 from the University of Texas at Arlington, and a Ph.D. in Human Science in 2000 at the Saybrook Graduate School. This doctoral research was conducted under the mentorship of Béla H. Bánáthy, focused on Social Systems Design and Organizational Development.

Metcalf began his professional career as a systems-oriented family therapist, working with teenagers and their families in short-term residential facilities. Between 1987 and 1989, Metcalf was the manager of Employee Assistance Programs at Tandy Corporation. From 1989 to 1998, Metcalf was a manager at Ashland Inc., designing and implementing an Employee Assistant Program and leading a team to promote corporate-wide health programs. And in 1998 he founded InterConnections, LLC an organizational consulting firm based in Ashland, Kentucky.

From 2003 to 2018, Gary Metcalf was on the teaching faculty of Saybrook University, as graduate instructor in Organizational Systems, and Research. Between 2004 and 2009, he was an instructor in the Federal Executive Institute, Office of Personnel Management, US Federal Government. From 2005 to 2009, he taught in the Bhavan Marshall MBA Program in Bangalore, India. And since 2011, Metcalf has been a Distinguished Lecturer at Sullivan University, in the PhD in Management program. And since 2011, he has been visiting faculty at Aalto University, teaching courses in systems thinking in the Master's Programme in Creative Sustainability.

Gary Metcalf is a past president for the International Society for the Systems Sciences (2007–2008). In this role, he led the ISSS 2008 meeting at University of Wisconsin-Madison. From this meeting, he edited the General Systems Research, published as Systems Research and Behavioral Science volume 26, issue 5. Metcalf served as president of the International Federation for Systems Research from 2010 to 2016. Previously, he served in the role of Vice President on the Executive Committee of the IFSR from 2002. He resides in Ashland, Kentucky today.

== Publications ==
Gary Metcalf is author and coauthor of several books and articles. A selection:

- 1985. An Evaluation of Family Therapy at a Runaway Shelter. University of Texas at Arlington, 1985.
- 2001. The management of people in mergers and acquisitions. With Teresa A. Daniel. Westport, Conn. : Quorum Books. ISBN 1-56720-369-8

Articles and papers

- 1999. "A Critique of Social Systems Theory". In M. L. W. Hall & J. Wilby (Eds.), Humanity, Science, Technology: The Systemic Foundations of the Information Age. From the 43rd Annual Conference of the International Society for the Systems Sciences, Presented at the ISSS conference in Asilomar, CA, June 1999
- 2002. "Rigor and relevance in systems work" Isss journal 2002.
- 2003. "Learning to Design Systems". In: World Futures: Journal of General Evolution, Vol 59(1), 21-36
- 2003. "Dialogue and Ecological Engineering in Social Systems Design". In: Proceedings of the 52nd Annual Meeting of the ISSS, Proceedings of the 52nd Annual Meeting of the ISSS.
- 2003. "Right choices in a complex world" paper LLC InterConnections at systemicbusiness.org
- 2005. "The Science of Motivation". With Dr. Teresa A. Daniel.
- 2004. "Implements and images: The making of social systems" paper LLC InterConnections at systemicbusiness.org
- 2005. "The Fundamentals of Employee Recognition ", With T.A. Daniel. Society for Human Resource Management white paper.
- 2010. "John Bowlby - Rediscovering a systems scientist ". International Society for the Systems Sciences.
