= Len R. Troncale =

American biologist

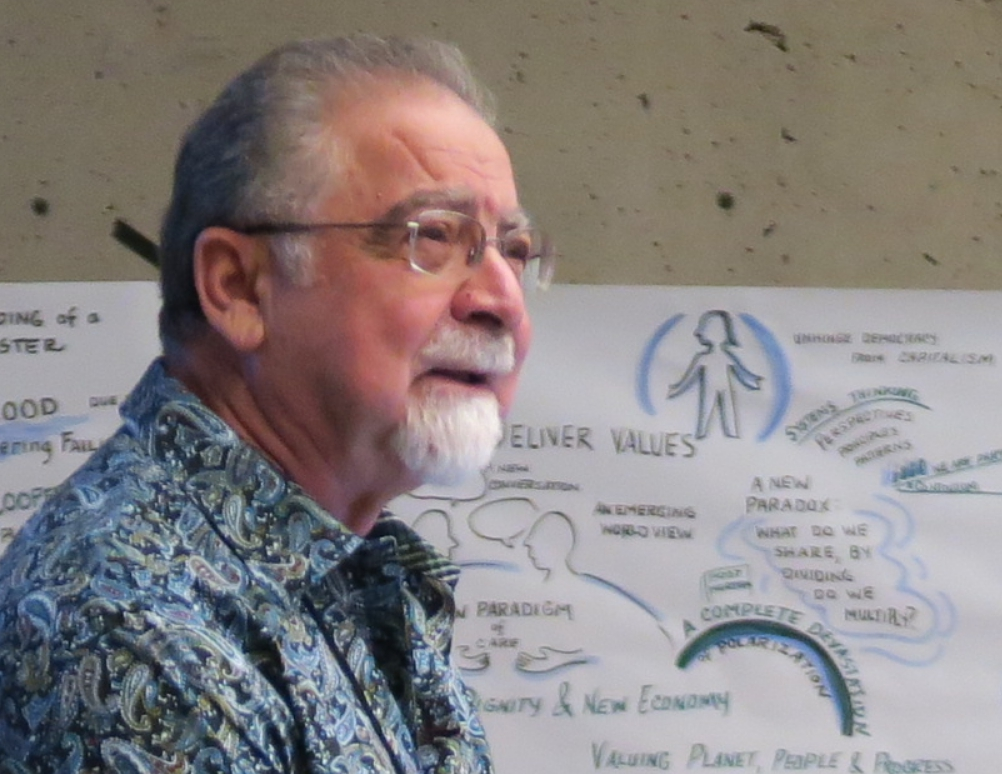
- Len R. Troncale
- Born: Lenard Raphael Troncale; 1943
- Died: 2025 (aged 81–82)
- Education: Catholic University of America
- Scientific career
- Fields: Cellular biology, molecular biology, systems science
- Workplaces: California State Polytechnic University

Lenard Raphael Troncale (born 1943) is an American biologist, systems theorist, Professor Emeritus of Cellular and Molecular Biology, and former Director of the Institute for Advanced Systems Studies at the California State Polytechnic University.

== Life and work ==
Troncale studied at the Catholic University of America from 1966 to 1970, and received his PhD in 1970 in Molecular Biology. He started working at the Department of Biology at the California State University. Later in the 1970s he became Professor Cellular and Molecular Biology, and Director of the Institute for Advanced Systems Studies at the California State Polytechnic University. In 1990–91 he served as president of the International Society for the Systems Sciences.

Troncale's major contribution to systems science is the development of Systems Processes Theory and Systems Linkage Propositions. His research interests are in the fields of Cellular and Molecular Biology; Systems Science; Biosystems Allometry; Biohierarchies; Molecular Evolution; Theory of Systems Emergence; Proteins of the chromosome scaffold and nuclear matrix of eo-eukaryotes; Organization and function of the nucleus; Theoretical models of cell differentiation.

== Publications ==
Troncale has written and edited several books, articles and research papers. Books:

- Troncale, Len.. Origins of hierarchies by the action of systems field axioms. Pomona : Publisher Pomona, Calif., California State Polytechnic University, 1972.
- Troncale, Len. Systems science and science : proceedings of the twenty-sixth annual meeting of the Society for General Systems Research with the American Association for the Advancement of Science, Washington, D.C., January 5–9, 1982. Edited. Louisville, KY. : Society for General Systems Research, 1982.
- Troncale, Len. A General Survey of Systems Methodology. (Ed.) Louisville KY: Society for General Systems Research, January 1982.
- Troncale, Len. The Tao of Systems Science: Systems Science of the Tao. Pomona : Institute for Advanced Systems Studies, Calif. State Univ., 1984.

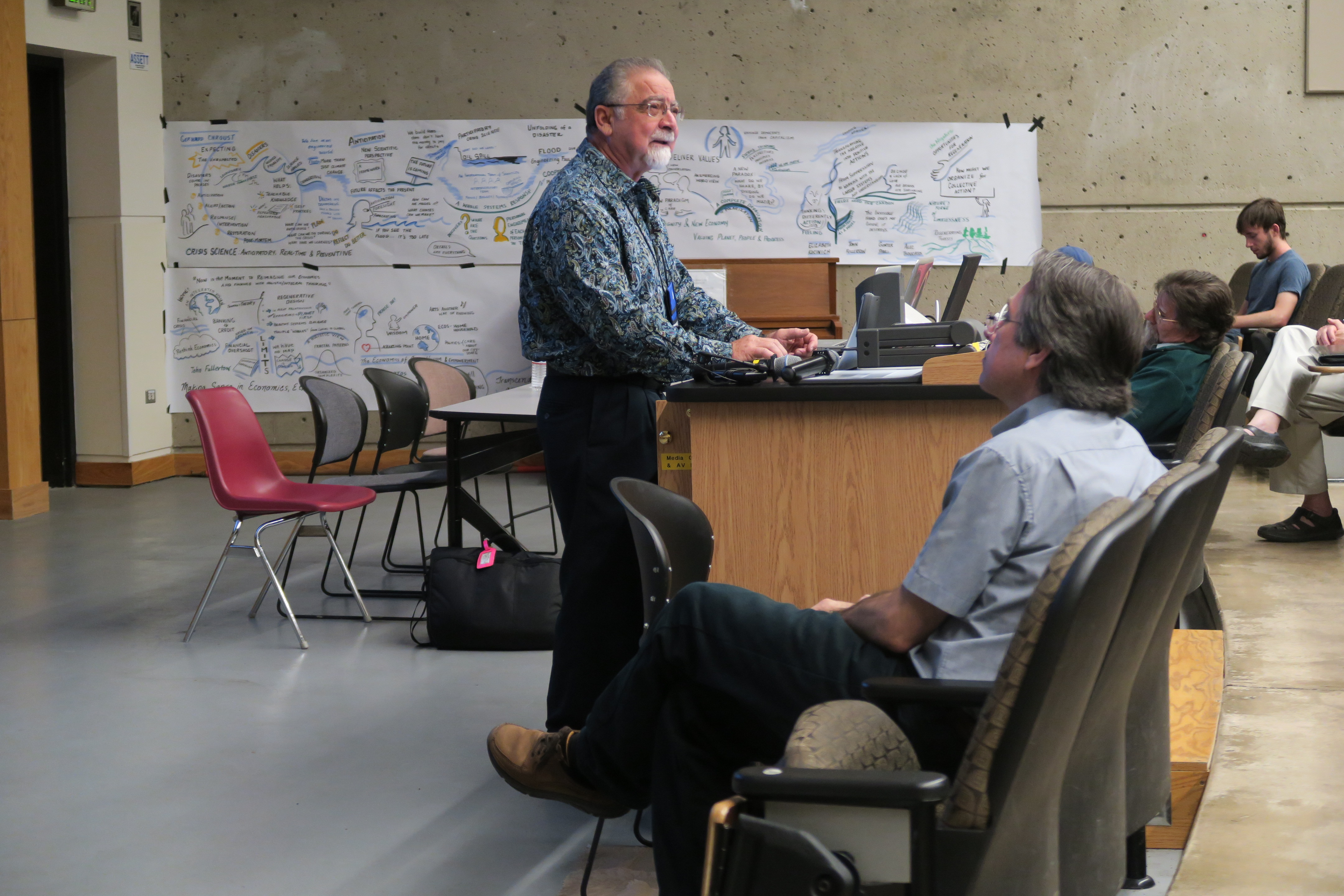
Len Troncale at the 60th Annual Meeting of the International Society for the Systems Sciences (ISSS), Boulder, USA 2016

Articles and research papers. A selection

- Troncale, Len. "Linkage Propositions Between Fifty Principle Systems Concepts", in: Applied General Systems Research, ed. George Klir, Plenum, New York, 1978. pp. 29–52.
- Troncale, Len. "The Ecological Imperative: Emergence of Meta-Humans" in: Searching for Civilization: The Humanities and Technology in The Formation of Public Policy. Pomona : Calif. State Polytechnic Univ, 1979. pp. 60–93.

1980s

- Troncale, Len. "Emergence of Meta-Humans", in: Searching for Civilization, pp. 60–93, Calif. St. Polytech., Pomona, 1980.
- Troncale, Len. "Are Levels of Complexity in Bio-Systems Real", in: Applied Systems and Cybernetics, v. 2, ed. George Lasker, pp. 1020–1026, Pergamon, New York, 1981.
- Troncale, Len. "The Emergence of Meta-Humans." in: General Systems Theory and the Psychological Sciences. Vol. I. The Human Knowledge Process. W. Gray, J. Fidler, and J. Battista (Eds.). Intersystems Publications, Seaside, Ca., 1982. pp. 187–203.
- Troncale, Len. "Towards a Formalization of Systems Linkage Propositions", With B.H. Voorhees. In: General Systems Yearbook, v. 28, ed. R. Ragade, 1983. pp. 187–195
- Troncale, Len. "Hybrid Systems Methodology: Tests for Hierarchy and Linkages Between Isomorphisms", in: Cybernetics and Systems Research 2, ed. R. Trappl, pp. 39–45, North-Holland, Béla H. Bánáthy, pp. 186–199, Intersystems, Seaside CA, 1984.
- Troncale, Len. "Future of General Systems Research", in: Systems Research, v. 2:1, pp. 43–84, Reprint in Systems Thinking. Volume One: General Systems Theory, Cybernetics and Complexity. Edited by Gerald Midgley. Sage Publications Ltd. 1985.
- Troncale, Len. "Allometry in Biology, Allometry in Systems Science", in: Proc. 30th SGSR, v. 1, ed. John Dillon, pp.D51-D61, SGSR, 1986.
- Troncale, Len. "Duality Theory III", in: Proc. 31st SGSR, v. 1, ed. Istvan Kiss, SGSR, 1987.
- Troncale, Len. "New Field of Systems Allometry", in: Cybernetics and Systems '88, ed. R. Trappl, pp. 123–130, Kluwer, Boston,
- Troncale, Len. "Systems Sciences: What Are They? Are They One, or Many?", European Journal of Operational Research, v. 37, 1988. bpp. 8–33.

1990s

- Troncale, Len. D. Williams, J. Putinier, and J. Cramer (1990b) "What Empirical Testing of Hierarchies & Systems Allometry Says About General Systems Models of Evolution/Emergence", Proceedings of the 34th Annual Mtg. of the International Society for the Systems Sciences (ISSS), Béla A. Bánáthy, Editor. Portland State University,1990. pp. 1151–1156.
- Troncale, Len. "GENSYS: A Knowledge-Base for Systems Science", pp. 589–604, "Ostersund, presented at 35th ISSS, 1991.
- Troncale, Len, Chung Lee and K. Nelson, et al. "Six Case Studies of Empirically-Based Chaos/Fractal Research", in: Proc. 35th ISSS, ed. Béla A. Bánáthy and Béla H. Bánáthy, 1991. pp. 1157–1164, ISSS,
- Troncale, Len. "Selection and sequencing of systems concepts for systems education. Case studies in integrated science and environmental science." Ethical Management of Science as a System. Proceedings of the 37th Annual Meeting of the International Society of Systems Sciences, Hawkesbury. 1995.
