= Bánáthy =

Bánáthy is a Hungarian surname. Notable people with the surname include:

- Béla A. Bánáthy (born 1943), American systems scientist
- Béla H. Bánáthy (1919–2003), Hungarian-American linguist, systems scientist and professor
