= International Society for the Systems Sciences =

Professional organization

International Society for the Systems Sciences (ISSS)
- Founded: 1954
- Type: Professional Organization
- Purpose: Systems sciences
- Location: Tennessee, United States
- Origins: Society for General Systems Research (SGSR)
- Region served: Worldwide
- Method: Special Integration Groups, Conferences, Publications
- Key people: Roelien Goede (current president), George Mobus (past president), Jennifer Makar (VP of Administration)
- Website: www.isss.org/home/

The International Society for the Systems Sciences (ISSS) is a worldwide organization for systems sciences. The overall purpose of the ISSS is:

to promote the development of conceptual frameworks based on general system theory, as well as their implementation in practice. It further seeks to encourage research and facilitate communication between and among scientists and professionals from various disciplines and professions at local, regional, national, and international levels.

Conceived in 1954 as the Society for the Advancement of General Systems Theory, and started in 1955/56, the Society for General Systems Research became the first interdisciplinary and international co-operation in the field of systems theory and systems science. In 1988 it was renamed the International Society for the Systems Sciences.

== History ==
The society was initiated in 1954 by biologists Ludwig von Bertalanffy and Ralph Gerard, economist Kenneth Boulding, and mathematician Anatol Rapoport at the Stanford Center for Advanced Study in the Behavioral Sciences. They called a meeting at the American Association for the Advancement of Science meeting in Berkeley in 1954. At this meeting, attended by seventy people, the society was conceived as the Society for the Advancement of General Systems Theory. The next year Boulding, Gerard and Rapoport started working with James Grier Miller at the Mental Health Research Institute of the University of Michigan. There the society got underway as "Society for General Systems Research".

The statement of the mission of the society was formulated with the following four objectives:

- to investigate the isomorphy of concepts, laws, and models in various fields, and to help in useful transfers from one field to another
- to encourage the development of adequate theoretical models in areas which lack them
- to eliminate the duplication of theoretical efforts in different fields
- to promote the unity of science through improving the communication among specialists.

In the 1960s local chapters were established in Boston, New York, San Francisco, Washington, D.C, and Florida. Annual meetings were held in the winter, and annually a General Systems Yearbook was published. Periodical articles were published in the society's journal Behavioral Science, and additionally "The Bulletin" offered regional and thematic publications.

In 1971 the Society had 1100 individual and 6 institutional members, and a membership in some societies affiliated with the American Association for the Advancement of Science. In 1988, the society was renamed the International Society for the Systems Sciences (ISSS) to "reflect its broadening scope".

== Activities ==
Important activities of the Society are:

- the General Systems Yearbook
- the General Systems Bulletin
- the Special Integration Groups

A listing of the Special Integration Groups (SIGs) gives an idea of the themes of ongoing development in the Society:

- Agent-based Social Simulation
- Balancing Individualism and Collectivism
- Critical Systems Theory & Practice
- Designing Educational Systems
- Evolutionary Development
- Foundations of Information Systems
- Health and Systems Thinking
- Hierarchy theory
- Human Systems Inquiry
- Information Systems Design and Information Technology
- ISSS Roundtable
- Living Systems Analysis
- Monetary Systems
- Organizational transformation and Social change
- Research Towards General Theories of Systems
- Service Systems Science
- Socio-Ecological Systems
- Spirituality and Systems
- Student Special Integration Group
- Systemic Approaches to Conflict and Crises
- Systemic Approaches to Persistent Poverty and Disadvantage
- Systems Applications in Business & Industry
- Systems Biology and Evolution
- Systems and Mental Health
- Systems Modeling and Simulation
- Systems Engineering
- Systems Pathology
- What is Life/Living

== Presidents ==
Among the Presidents of ISSS have been foremost scientists from several fields and countries, including some Nobel laureates:

- Yiannis Laouris, 2025–2026
- Gary R. Smith, 2024–2025
- Michele Friend, 2023–2024
- Roelien Goede, 2022–2023
- George Mobus, 2021–2022
- Delia MacNamara, 2020–2021
- Shankar Sankaran, 2019–2020
- Peter D. Tuddenham, 2018–2019
- David Rousseau, 2017–2018
- Ockie Bosch, 2016–2017
- John Kineman, 2015–2016
- Ray Ison, 2014–2015
- Gerald Midgley, 2013–2014
- Alexander Laszlo, 2012–2013
- David Ing, 2011–2012
- Jennifer Wilby, 2010–2011
- Allenna Leonard, 2009–2010
- Timothy F. H. Allen, 2008–2009
- Gary Metcalf, 2007–2008
- Kyoichi Kijima, 2006–2007
- Debora Hammond, 2005–2006
- Enrique Herrscher, 2004–2005
- Kenneth D. Bailey, 2003
- Alexander Christakis, 2002
- Michael C. Jackson, 2001
- Harold G. Nelson, 2000
- Peter Corning, 1999
- Béla A. Bánáthy, 1998
- G. A. Swanson, 1997
- Yong Pil Rhee, 1996
- Ervin Laszlo, 1995
- J. Donald R. de Raadt, 1994
- Harold A. Linstone, 1993
- Ian I. Mitroff, 1992
- Howard T. Odum 1991
- Len R. Troncale, 1990
- C. West Churchman 1989
- Ilya Prigogine, 1988
- Russell L. Ackoff, 1987
- Peter Checkland, 1986
- John A. Dillon, 1985
- Bela H. Banathy, 1984
- Karl Deutsch, 1983
- John N. Warfield, 1982
- George Klir, 1981
- Robert Rosen, 1980
- Brian R. Gaines, 1979
- Richard F. Ericson, 1978
- Geoffrey Vickers, 1977
- Heinz von Foerster, 1976
- Kjell Samuelson, 1975
- Gordon Pask, 1974
- James Grier Miller, 1973
- Margaret Mead, 1972
- Stafford Beer, 1971
- Bertram Gross, 1970
- Lawrence Slobodkin, 1969
- Milton Rubin, 1968
- John Milsum, 1967
- Peter Caws, 1966
- Anatol Rapoport, 1965
- W. Ross Ashby 1962–1964
- Charles A. McClelland 1959–1961
- Kenneth E. Boulding, 1957–58

== Sir Geoffrey Vickers Memorial Award ==
The Sir Geoffrey Vickers Memorial Award is an annual award in memory of Sir Geoffrey Vickers for outstanding student papers at the pre-doctoral level in the field of the systems sciences. A listing of recipients:

- 1985 New York, Ib Ravn
- 1986 Philadelphia, Doug Elias
- 1987 Budapest, two awards: Alexander Laszlo; Lynda J. Davies and Paul W.J. Ledington (co-authors)
- 1988 St Louis, J. Donald R. de Raadt
- 1989 Edinburgh, Béla A. Bánáthy
- 1990 Portland, two awards: Sally Goerner; Daune West
- 1991 Sweden, Erin Artigiani, Cliff Joslyn
- 1992 Denver, Sen Suan Tan
- 1993 Australia, Jeremy Chui
- 1994 Asilomar, T. Dahl and Darek Erikson
- 1995 Amsterdam, two awards: Craig Crabtree; Jennifer Wilby
- 1996 Louisville, Parviz Ahari
- 1996 Budapest, No Award
- 1997 Seoul, No Award
- 1998 Atlanta, Martine Dodds
- 1999 Asilomar, Molly Dwyer and Jane Zimmerman
- 2000 Toronto, two awards: Gabor Horvath; Kathia Laszlo
- 2001 Asilomar, Lynn M. Rasmussen
- 2002 Shanghai, two awards: Pamela Buckle; K. C. Wang
- 2003 Crete, Sabrina Brahms
- 2004 Asilomar, Janette Young
- 2005 Cancun, Honorato Teissier
- 2006 Sonoma, Hanne Birgitte Jensen
- 2007 Tokyo, Nicholas Magliocca
- 2008 Madison, Devin Wixon
- 2009 Brisbane, Anne Stephens
- 2010 Waterloo, Todd D Bowers
- 2011 Kingston upon Hull, Mary C Edson
- 2012 San Jose, William J. Varey
- 2013 Hai Phong, Victor MacGill
- 2014 Washington, Anne Powel Davis
- 2015 Berlin, Alexandre Strapasson
- 2016 Boulder, Skyler Knox Perkins
- 2017 Vienna, No Award
- 2018 Corvallis, Sage McKenzie Kittleman
- 2019 Corvallis, Oregon, Peter L Roolf

== See also ==
- General Systems: Yearbook of the Society for General Systems Research
- List of systems sciences organizations
- International Federation for Systems Research (IFSR)
- International Council on Systems Engineering (INCOSE)
- International Society for Complexity, Information and Design (ISCID)
- Mental Health Research Institute (Michigan)
