= Alexander Laszlo =

Swiss-born scientist (born 1964)

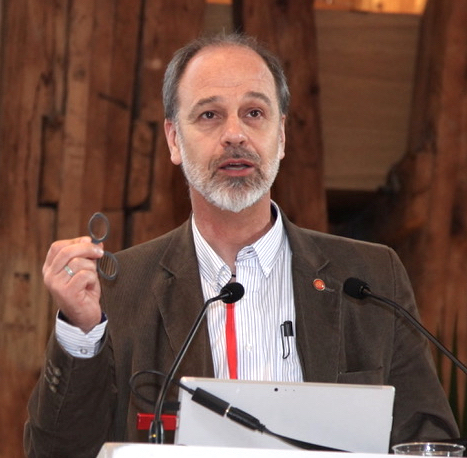
Alexander Laszlo at the ISSS Conference in Vienna, in 2017

Alexander Laszlo (born 1964) is a polycultural systems scientist, currently residing in Argentina.

Laszlo was the 57th President of the International Society for the Systems Sciences (ISSS), known for his work on systems theories and "education ecosystems". He, furthermore, is the President of the Board of Directors of the Bertalanffy Center for the Study of Systems Science (BCSSS), based in Vienna, Austria. He also functions as the director of research at the Laszlo Institute of New Paradigm Research (LINPR), which is based in Trieste, Italy.

With his research and work Alexander Laszlo has delivered outstanding contributions in the fields of leadership, systemic innovation, and sustainability.

== Life ==
Alexander Laszlo was born in Fribourg, Switzerland in 1964, is the son of Ervin László and Carita Jägerhorn af Spurila whose family home is in Tuscany, Italy. Due to his extensive travels and activities in the USA, Latin America, East Asia, and Europe he is fluent in several languages, including French, Italian, and Spanish. He is the father of one child, Kahlia Paola.

Laszlo earned an International Baccalaureate Diploma from the United Nations International School in 1982, with a focus on Social and Cultural Anthropology. He then received a BA from Haverford College, with a major in International and Comparative Political Science and a minor in Human Physiology, in 1985. At the University of Pennsylvania, he received his MA in History and Sociology of Science, in 1987, and a PhD in the interdisciplinary field of Science and Technology Policy, in 1992.

Laszlo is an instructor of Martial Arts and holds a 6th Degree Black Belt in Chung Do Kwan style of Tae Kwon Do and 2nd Degree Black Belt in Shotokan style of Karate. He, furthermore, is a skilled classical flutist and follows several hobbies, including alpine skiing, mountain biking, science-fiction and poetry.

== Work ==
Laszlo was the founding director of the Doctoral Program in Leadership and Systemic Innovation at the Buenos Aires Institute of Technology (ITBA), in Argentina. He was also involved with the MCI Management Center in Innsbruck, Austria, where he functioned as visiting lecturer in International Business at The Entrepreneurial School. At the Giordano Bruno GlobalShift University, Laszlo was a member of the scientific advisory board as well as the Chief Learning Officer of Curriculum Innovation. Laszlo was faculty member at Sonoma State University, in Rohnert Park, USA, in Master's in Organizational Development program, at the Green MBA of the Dominican University, in San Rafael, USA, in the Executive Certificate Program, and at the Brainbridge Graduate Institute (now Pinchot University), in Seattle, USA, where he also worked as an adjunct professor in Systems Science and Evolutionary Development. At the Presidio School of Management, in San Francisco, USA, he functioned as Core Faculty and Administrative Leadership Team Member. Laszlo worked as a professor at the Tuoro University, in Cypress, at the California Institute of Integral Studies, in San Francisco, where he taught in the field of Learning and Human Development, at the Saysbrook Graduate Institute & Research Center, also in San Francisco, in the field of Systems Science and Design, and at the Monterrey Institute of Technology (EGADE-ITESM), in Mexico, in Administration and Leadership. At the ITESM Laszlo also worked as the Director of the Doctoral Program in Management, as well as director of research at the Center for Knowledge Systems, and was named a Level I Member of the National Research Academy of Mexico (SNI). Laszlo, furthermore, has held visiting appointments with the London School of Economics and the European University Institute.

Laszlo was involved as a researcher, consultant, and scholar with several more international higher education institutions, as well as public and private institutions, including the Italian Electric Power Agency, the UNESCO Regional Office for Science and Technology for Europe in Italy, as well as Brookhaven National Laboratory, in New York, USA. He continues to teach and consult on evolutionary leadership, collaboration, and systems thinking at a variety of MBA and Doctoral programs internationally.

== Awards ==
Very early in his academic career Alexander Laszlo began to receive awards. Thus, he was awarded the Gertrude Albert Heller Award in 1984 for his research and preparation of a bio-ethics paper presented at the International Academy of Philosophy of Science, in Brussels, Belgium. He also is the recipient of the Sir Geoffrey Vickers Memorial Award, presented for outstanding student papers at the pre-doctoral level in the field of the systems sciences. The award is given by the International Society for the Systems Sciences (ISSS) and Laszlo received it in 1987. He was also the winner of the Förderpreis Akademischer Klub Award of the University of St. Gallen, Switzerland, for his work in social innovation and sustainable development, and finalist for the 2003 Beyond Gray Pinstripes Award of the World Resources Institute and the Aspen Institute for educational work in sustainable business.

== Selected publications ==
Alexander Laszlo is on the Editorial Boards of Cybernetics and Human Knowing; Systems Research & Behavioral Science; World Futures: The Journal of New Paradigm Research; Kybernetes: The International Journal of Cybernetics, Systems and Management Sciences; Systema · Connecting Matter, Life, Culture and Technology; Markets and Business Systems; Organisational Transformation & Social Change; and Managing Global Transitions: International Research Journal. An active member of several systems science societies, among them Chair of Curating Emergence for Thrivability SIG at International Society for the Systems Sciences (ISSS), Alexander Laszlo is author of over 100 journal, book, and encyclopedia publications, with Syntony Sense: Evolutionary Intuition for World Changers forthcoming.

- "Technological racism and unnatural selection: Foreseeable systemic impacts of a genetic screening of the workforce" (with Ervin Laszlo). Forum for Correspondence and Contact, 15(1), March 1985. pp. 31–35.
- "The ethical implications of the social impact of genetic screening for employment" (with Ervin Laszlo). In La responsabilité éthique dans le développement biomédical, Archives de l’Institut International des Sciences Théoriques, vol. 28. Luvain-la-Neuve: CIACO, 1987. pp. 331–341.
- "Cognitive maps and the energy-culture interaction." World Futures: The Journal of General Evolution, 30(3), December 1990. pp. 8–13.
- "The electric industry and its interaction with local cultural values in late 18th and early 19th century Italy" (with Ignazio Masulli). In the ENEL encyclopedia by G. Mori (Ed.), Storia dell’industria electrica in Italia, vol. 1: Dalle origini alla vigilia della Prima Guerra Mondiale (1882-1914). 5 vols. Rome and Bari: Laterza, 1992. pp. 645–696.
- "The contribution of the systems sciences to the humanities" (with Ervin Laszlo). Systems Research and Behavioral Science 14.1 (1997): 5–19.
- "Systems theories: Their origins, foundations, and development" (with Stanley. Krippner). In J.S. Jordan (Ed.), Systems theories and a priori aspects of perception. Amsterdam: Elsevier Science, 1998. Ch. 3, pp. 47–74.
- "Evolutionary systems design: A soft technology for hard challenges." World Futures: The Journal of General Evolution, 1999, Vol. 54. pp. 313–335.
- "The epistemological foundations of evolutionary systems design." Systems Research and Behavioral Science 18.4 (2001): 307–321.
- "The systems sciences in service of humanity" (with Ervin Laszlo). Encyclopedia of Life Support Systems (EOLSS), F. Parra-Luna (Ed.). EOLSS Publishers, Oxford, UK (2003).
- "The evolutionary challenge for technology." World Futures: The Journal of General Evolution, 2003, Vol. 59, No. 8.
- "Evolutionary Systems Design: A praxis for sustainable development." Organisational Transformation & Social Change, 2003. Vol. 1, No. 1. pp. 29–46.
- "The nature of evolution." World Futures: The Journal of General Evolution, Vol. 65, No. 3, April 2009, pp. 204–221.
- "A systems view of Ervin Laszlo, from one generation to the next: An edited and annotated autobiographical piece" (with a contribution by Christopher Laszlo and incorporation of original material from Ervin Laszlo). World Futures: The Journal of General Evolution, 67:4-5, 2011, pp. 219–243.
- "Growth, Development and Evolution – the parameters of change in a dynamic world" (with Stefan Blachfellner). Special double-issue of the Journal of Organisational Transformation & Social Change dedicated to "The Fundamental Concept of Growth: Limits in an Unlimited World?" A. Laszlo and S. Blachfellner (Guest Eds.). Vol. 9, No. 1, 2012, pp. 41–61.
- "Virtual Learning in a Socially Digitized World" (with Regina Rowland, Gail Taylor and Todd Johnston). World Futures: The Journal of Global Education, Vol. 68, No. 8, November 2012, pp. 575–594.
- "Thrivable Education" (with Jean Russell). In E. Laszlo and K. Dennis (Eds.), Dawn of the Akashic Age: New Consciousness, Quantum Resonance, and the Future of the World, Rochester, VT: Inner Traditions, 2013, pp. 168–176.
- "Connecting the DOTS: The Design Of Thrivable Systems through the power of Collective Intelligence" ISSS Yearbook Special Issue of Systems Research & Behavioral Science, A. Laszlo (Guest Ed.). Vol. 31, No. 5, 2014.
- "Living Systems, Seeing Systems, Being Systems: Learning to be the systems we wish to see in the world" Spanda Journal, Vol. 6, No. 1, June 2015 issue on Systemic Change. pp. 165–173.
- "Conversation Communities in Context: A Retrospective Perspective." Special issue of Constructivist Foundations on Composing Conferences: Exploring Alternatives to the Traditional Conference Format, M. Hohl & B. Sweeting (Guest Eds.), Vol. 11, No. 1, 15 November 2015. pp. 45–56.
- What Is Reality? The New Map of Cosmos and Consciousness (with E. Laszlo), New York, NY: SelectBooks, Inc., 2016.
- "Educational Ecosystems for Societal Transformation" (with Pavel Luksha, Joshua Cubista, Mila Popovich, and Ivan Ninenko). Produced by Global Education Futures (GEF), ReàEngineering Futures, and the Global Venture Alliance (GVA). Moscow, Russia: GEF Press, 2017.
- "Systemic Innovation, Education and the Social Impact of the Systems Sciences" (with Dino Karabeg and Pavel Luksha). ISSS Yearbook Special Issue of Systems Research & Behavioral Science, J. Kineman (Guest Ed.). Vol. 35, No. 5, 2017. Pp. 601–608.
- "Living the New Paradigm: Syntony and Spark in Life, Being and Becoming." In The Handbook of New Paradigm Research. A publication of the Laszlo Institute of New Paradigm Research. Cardiff, CA: Waterfront Press, 2018.
- "Education for The Future: The Emerging Paradigm of Thrivable Education" In World Futures: The Journal of New Paradigm Research. ISSN 1556-1844; doi:10.1080/02604027.2018.1463760. May 2018.
- "Attracting our Future into Being: The Syntony Quest" (with Anneloes Smitsman and Kurt Barnes). World Futures: The Journal of New Paradigm Research. ISSN 1556-1844; doi:10.1080/02604027.2018.1499850. September 2018.
- "The Leadership of Co-Creative Innovation – Systems, Technology, Society". Preface to the Special Issue of Systems Research & Behavioral Science on Co-Creating Responsible Futures in the Digital Age: Selected papers from the 5th Business Systems Laboratory International Symposium of 2018, A. Laszlo (Guest Ed.). Vol. 35, No. 4, August 2018.
