= Geoffrey Vickers =

British systems administrator (1894–1982)

Colonel Sir Geoffrey Vickers VC
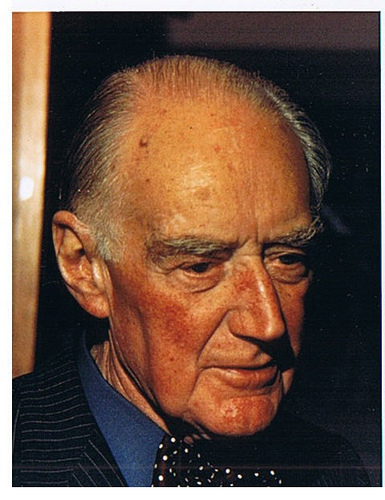
- Vickers in 1973
- Born: 13 October 1894; Nottingham, England
- Died: 16 March 1982 (aged 87); Goring-on-Thames, Oxfordshire
- Military career
- Allegiance: United Kingdom
- Branch: British Army
- Service years: 1914–1919, 1939–1945
- Rank: Colonel
- Unit: The Sherwood Foresters
- Conflicts: World War I; World War II
- Awards: Victoria Cross; Croix de Guerre (Belgium)
- Other work: Systems scientist

Colonel Sir Charles Geoffrey Vickers, VC (13 October 1894 – 16 March 1982) was an English soldier, lawyer, administrator, writer and pioneering systems scientist. He had varied interests with roles at different times with the London Passenger Transport Board, Law Society, Medical Research Council and Mental Health Research Fund. In the later years he wrote and lectured on social systems analysis and the complex patterns of social organisation. The Sir Geoffrey Vickers Memorial Award has been presented by the International Society for the Systems Sciences since 1987 in his memory.

He was awarded the Victoria Cross in World War I while serving in The Sherwood Foresters, and was knighted following World War II, during which he served as Deputy Director General at the Ministry of Economic Warfare, in charge of economic intelligence and as a member of the Joint Intelligence Committee.

== Biography ==
=== Early life ===
Geoffrey Vickers was born and grew up in Nottingham, where his father Charles Henry Vickers ran a successful lace business, Vickers & Hine Ltd. He described his first day of school as "school introduced me to the anguish reserved both for the non-conformist who wishes to conform and the awkward who long to excel in dexterity". He attended Bramcote, a preparatory school near Scarborough and then Oundle School; a public school before entering Merton College, Oxford where he briefly studied Classics from 1913 until the start of war.

He later described his home as "a place of unalloyed happiness. The only stresses of the time came from the external world of school or the internal world of awakening conflict and confusion ... I remember nothing desired that was satisfied by spending money of mine and nothing that was denied for lack of money ... we moved by bicycle and bus, played in each other's gardens and stayed in farmhouses". He described his father as "the best and most lovable man I ever knew; and he seemed to combine the two superlatives without the slightest effort".

=== World War I ===
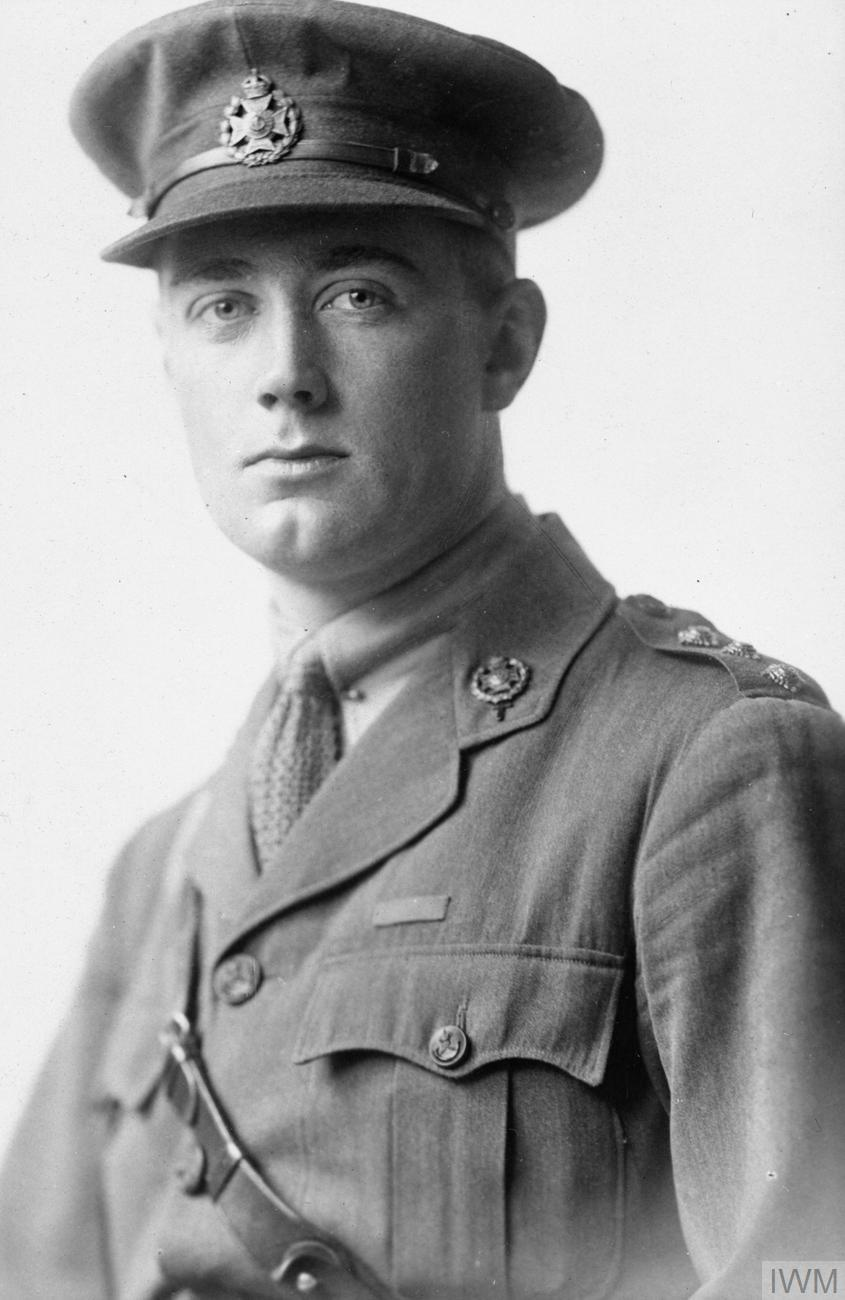
Vickers during the war.

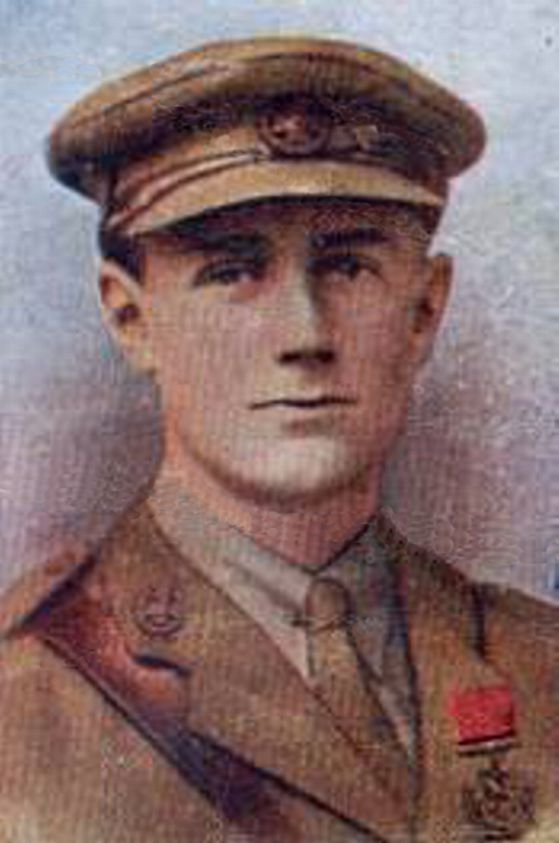
Photo submitted by Martin Hornby - (Gallaher Cigarette Cards).

His education was interrupted by World War I. He and his brother William Burnell Vickers volunteered for service in the army. Geoffrey joined the Sherwood Foresters (7th Robin Hood Battalion) and was in France before the end of 1914 first as a second lieutenant, promoted to temporary captain in 1915 and then to major and as second in command, 1 Bn, The Lincolnshire Regiment in 1918. Explaining his thoughts about going to war, he later wrote

In August Germany invaded Belgium, we had a treaty with Belgium, so we all stopped what we were doing and went off to war. It was as simple as that.

He was awarded the Victoria Cross (VC) for action in October 1915 and the Croix de Guerre (Belgium) in 1918. The citation for his VC, appearing in The London Gazette in November 1915, reads as follows:

For most conspicuous bravery on 14th October, 1915, in the Hohenzollern redoubt. When nearly all his men had been killed or wounded, and with only two men available to hand him bombs, Captain Vickers held a barrier for some hours against heavy German bomb attacks from front and flank. Regardless of the fact that his own retreat would be cut off, he had ordered a second barrier to be built behind him in order to ensure the safety of the trench. Finally he was severely wounded, but not before his magnificent courage and determination had enabled the second barrier to be completed. A critical situation was thus saved.

His brother Burnell was killed in action on 21 June 1917 while serving with the 184th Siege Battery of the Royal Garrison Artillery.

In June 1918 he commanded a composite battalion in the Second Battle of the Marne for which he was awarded the Belgian Croix de Guerre.

=== Inter-war years ===
After the war he returned to Oxford and took a pass degree in French, European history and law in 1919. He qualified as a solicitor in 1923 and by 1926 he was a partner in the leading London law firm of Slaughter and May. He specialised in the legal aspects of large financial operations, many of which had international dimensions. In 1930 he was one of the first to take the five-day Imperial Airways commercial flight from the UK to India and during the 1930s he was also involved in negotiating the extension of the German debt.

In 1938 he established and chaired the 'Association for Service and Reconstruction. The above initiative put him in touch with a number of people who met regularly in a group called 'The Moot' that also included Joe Oldham, Karl Mannheim, Reinhard Niebuhr, Paul Tillich, John Middleton Murry, T. S. Eliot, Michael Polanyi, Sir Walter Moberly and Adolph Lowe. The Moot itself grew out of a conference on Church, Community and State held in Oxford in 1937.

=== World War II ===
Vickers served in World War II; he was re-commissioned as a colonel, and was seconded as Deputy Director General at the Ministry of Economic Warfare, in charge of economic intelligence. From 1941 to 1945 he was a member of the Joint Intelligence Committee of the Chiefs of Staff.

He was also a member of the London Passenger Transport Board (1942–46) and of the Council of Law Society (1938–50).

=== Afterwards ===
After the war, Vickers had a successful career in management and administration before becoming a prolific writer and speaker on the subject of social systems analysis and the complex patterns of social organisation. He wrote many books including The Art of Judgement, Freedom in a rocking Boat and Human Systems are Different. He introduced the concept of 'Appreciative Systems' to describe human activity. His work was taken up by researchers at the Open University in particular.

From 1946 to 1948 he was also first Legal Advisor to the National Coal Board. At the time of creation on 1 January 1947 when some 750,000 workers from 800 different private companies became part of the largest employer in the western world where he worked alongside E. F. Schumacher. Afterwards he became a member of National Coal Board in charge of manpower, training, education, health and welfare (1948–55).

From 1952 until 1960 he was member of the Medical Research Council and was chairman of the Research Committee of Mental Health Research Fund from 1951 to 1967. In 1977 he was president of the Society for General Systems Research, now the International Society for the Systems Sciences.

Between 1955 and 1958 he took part in the 'Round Table on Man and Industry', a project sponsored by the School of Social Work at the University of Toronto, the conclusions of which were published in The Undirected society. On the inside jacket cover he muses 'The Industrial band-wagon rolls ever faster onwards, remaking the world we live in and with it ourselves. Are we in the driving seat or merely passengers – or even under the wheels? What part does human decision making play in directing or controlling the process?'.

His second wife, and close companion, died in 1972. His manuscripts for 'Western Culture and Systems Thinking' and 'Autonomy and Responsibility' were constantly rejected for publication.

In 1977 he moved to a retirement home, on the same street in Goring-on-Thames on which he had lived for many years.

Geoffrey died in 1982; however, the influence for his work is still alive. The International Society for the Systems Sciences presents the Sir Geoffrey Vickers Memorial Award each year in his memory. His military medals were left to the Sherwood Foresters Collection and are on display in Nottingham Castle. His papers relating to systems thinking are archived at the Open University.

== Systems practice ==
In the later years Vickers wrote and lectured on the subject of social systems analysis and the complex patterns of social organisation. His work was taken up by researchers at the Open University in particular. Vickers is regarded as a systems practitioner rather than an academic. He introduced the concept of appreciative systems to describe human activity. He recognised that appreciation of systems requires the participation of not only the observer, but also that of the subject.

=== Appreciative systems and appreciative behaviour ===
Much of his work is devoted to the analysis of judgement in terms of what he called 'appreciative behaviour': this is described most effectively in The Art of Judgement (1965). He believed that social institutions are best analysed as systems, and his published work, notably Human Systems are Different (1983), made far-reaching contributions to systems thinking in its applications to human society.

Vickers coined the term "appreciative system" in his 1968 article "Science and the Appreciative System" to refer to "the activity of attaching meaning to communication or the code by which we do so". In "Human Systems are Different" (1983) Vickers explained:

I find it surprising that we have no accepted word to describe the activity of attaching meaning to communication or the code by which we do so, a code which is constantly confirmed, developed or changed by use. I have for many years referred to this mental activity as "appreciation'; and to the code which it uses, as its "appreciative system'; and to the state of that code at any time as its "appreciative setting'. I call it a system because, although tolerant of ambiguity and even inconsistency, it is sensitive to them and tries to reconcile them.

In a 1978 interview Vickers added:

I'm interested in Systems from the personal up to the very large, human, social systems, I'm also interested in systems of concepts and values through which we see all the others which I call appreciative systems.

A response by Peter Checkland in his "Systems Thinking Systems Practice":

Vickers argues that our human experience develops within us 'readiness to notice particular aspects of our situation, to discriminate them in particular ways and to measure them against particular standards of comparison...' These readinesses are organized into an appreciative system which creates for all of us, individually and socially, our appreciated world....The appreciative settings condition new experience but are modified by the new experience. Such circular relations Vickers takes to be the common facts of social life, but we fail to see this clearly, he argues, because of the concentration in our science-based culture on linear causal chains and on the notion of goal-seeking.
Vickers suggests replacing the goal-setting and goal-seeking with feedback models in which personal, institutional or cultural activity consists in maintaining desired relationships and eluding undesired ones. The process is a cyclical one which operates like this: Our previous experiences have created for us certain 'standards' or 'norms', usually 'tacit' (and also, at a more general level, 'values', more general concepts of what is humanly good and bad); the standards, norms and/or values lead to readiness to notice only certain features of our situations, they determine what 'facts' are relevant; the facts noticed are evaluated against the norms, a process which leads to our taking regulatory action and modifies the norms or standards, so that future experiences will be evaluated differently.

Geoffrey Vickers continued corresponding with Peter Checkland in the years before Vickers' death and discussed the relationship between systems ideas and real-world experience. From those discussions Checkland created the model of the appreciative process, that may be used as a basis for making sense of the world we live in. Checkland (2004) worked on numerous examples to demonstrate the way in which the model may be applied in very different situations.

=== Moral and political philosophy ===
Geoffrey Vickers' perspectives on moral and political philosophy can be presented through three key terms:

- Our human capacity to respond aptly to our situation;
- The analysis of modern society in terms of institutions; and
- The moral importance of responsibility to the maintenance of human culture and cooperation

== Publications ==
Systems thinking

- Geoffrey Vickers (1959). The Undirected Society. Essays on the human implications of industrialisation in Canada. University of Toronto Press. ASIN B000I2XXRC.
- Geoffrey Vickers (1965). The Art of Judgment: A Study of Policy Making. SAGE Publication. ISBN 0-8039-7363-2.
- Geoffrey Vickers (1967). Towards a sociology of management. Chapman and Hall. ISBN 0-412-08740-5.
- Geoffrey Vickers (1968). Value systems and social process. Tavistock Publications. ISBN 0-422-71950-1.
- Geoffrey Vickers (1972). Freedom in a rocking boat: changing values in an unstable society. Allen Lane. ISBN 0-7139-0146-2.
- Geoffrey Vickers (1973). 'Making Institutions Work. Wiley. ISBN 0-470-90689-8.
- Geoffrey Vickers (1980). Responsibility Its Sources and Limits. Intersystems Publications. ISBN 0-914105-18-3.
- Geoffrey Vickers (1983). Human Systems Are Different. Paul Chapman. ISBN 0-06-318262-9.
- Geoffrey Vickers (1984). Geoffrey Vickers; Open Systems Group (eds.). The Vickers Papers. HarperCollins. ISBN 0-06-318270-X.

Edited papers

- Geoffrey Vickers (1987). Guy B. Adams; John Forester; Bayard L. Catron (eds.). Policymaking, Communication, and Social Learning. ISBN 0-88738-115-4.
- Jeanie Vickers, ed. (1991). Rethinking the Future: The Correspondence Between Geoffrey Vickers and Adolph Lowe. Transaction Publishers. ISBN 0-88738-412-9.

For children

- Geoffrey Vickers. The Secret of Tarbury Tor. Oxford Basil Blackwell. ASIN B001KH9J40. – circa 1926

Poetry

- Geoffrey Vickers (1983). Moods and Tenses, 'Occasional Poems of an Old Man. Jeanie Vickers. ISBN 0-9509283-0-5.

World War II

- Vickers; et al. (20 December 1941). "A Background Bulletin". Current Affairs (7). Army Bureau of Current Affairs.

Vickers writings in Adolph Lowe Archive

- "Purpose and Force; The Bases of Order" (pub), 1940.
- "Incomes and Earnings–A Steady State?" (pub.), circa 1960.
- "The Management of Conflict" (pub.), 1972.
- "Towards a More Stable State" (pub.), 1972.
- Copies of Vickers-Simon Correspondence (unpub. TS), 1973.
- "Whither the Mixed Economy?" (pub.), 1973.
- "Some Implications of Systems Thinking" (unpub. TS), 1978.
- "The Poverty of Problem-Solving" (unpub. TS), 1980.
- "Autonomous Yet Responsible?" (unpub. TS), undated.
- "The Weakness of Western Culture" (unpub. TS), undated.
