= Milton Rubin =

American systems engineer (1914–1996)

Milton D. Rubin (1914–1996) was an American systems engineer and inventor, who was president of the Society for General Systems Research in 1968.

== Biography ==
In 1914 Milton Rubin was born in Boston and attended Boston Latin School. He received his formal education at Harvard University in communications engineering and applied mathematics, and graduated from Harvard College with a Bachelor of Science degree in electrical engineering. His son, Mark Jonathon Rubin, was born in 1947. His daughter, Lise Diane Rubin, was born in 1950.

Over the next 50 years, he worked for numerous engineering firms, where he served as manager of system engineering and consulting scientist. His career further included research into materials and components, and specialized in radar. In the 1940s he worked at the Raytheon Co. where he headed the Equipment Division. In 1954 he became consulting scientist, the highest professional level one can attain in the company. Later in the 1950s Rubin became Research Director at GA Philbrick Researches Inc. in Boston. From the 1960s until the 1980s he worked at the Mitre Corporation in Bedford, Massachusetts.

Rubin was organizationally active in the Society for General Systems Research. For years he was Secretary Treasurer and the Editor of the "General Systems Newsletter, quarterly". In 1968 he was president of the Society for General Systems Research. And in 1981 he received the IEEE-USA Award by the IEEE.

Milton D. Rubin of Newton died Saturday July 6, 1996 at Clark House in Westwood. He was survived by his wife, Tillie Rubin, daughter, Lise Diane Rubin, grandson, Joel Benjamin, and granddaughter, Eva Weinstein.

== Work ==
=== General Systems ===
One of the main lines of thought in General Systems according to Rubin in 1966 is the transfer of system concepts from one field to another. There has been fruitful application of such theoretical concepts from engineering to other fields such as biology.

In his 1966 paper "General Systems and Systems Engineering" Rubin attempted "to apply concepts from biology to the practice of systems engineering. The relation of systems engineering to other fields is discussed, utilizing an intellectual framework based on the concepts of speciation and competition between species. The internal social structure of the profession and of individual organizations is considered, using the concept of competition within a species. Examples are drawn from biology to illustrate the points at issue".

Rubin edited two books, contributed to one book and wrote several articles.

Books

- 1970, "Man in Systems" (ed.) New York: Gordon and Breach Science.
- 1973, "Systems in Society" (ed.) Washington, D.C.: Society for General Systems Research.

Contribution

- 1968, "History of technological feedback". Chapter 2 in: "Positive Feedback; a General Systems Approach to Positive/negative Feedback and Mutual Causality". Edited by John Milsum. Oxford : Pergamon Press.

Articles

- 1965, "Society for General Systems Research (L2)", in: "Science", Feb 19, 147 (3660): 926–927.
- 1966, "General Systems and Systems Engineering", in: "IEEE Transactions on Systems Science and Cybernetics", Vol 2, Issue 1, Aug. 66 Pages:3-7.
- 1971, "One General Systems View of Education", in "General Systems", Vol 16, 125.
