= Enrique Herrscher =

Enrique G. Herrscher is an Argentine economist, systems scientist and professor at the University of Buenos Aires.

== Biography ==
Herrscher has received a B.A. in strategic modelling from the London Business School, and an M.A. in administration and accountancy, and a Ph.D. in economic sciences.

Herrscher worked as associate Professor of University of Buenos Aires at the Faculty of Economic Sciences, in charge of the course of Long Range Planning and Feasibility Studies. Now Consulting Professor dedicated to Research. He was Director of the Global Project of Investment in Education of the World Bank for Argentina. For 14 years he was Director of Standard Electric Argentina SAIC as Chief Financial Officer and as Director of Planning. And during 10 years he was president, of the Corporate Planning & Control Committee of the Consejo Profesional de Ciencias Económicas de la Capital Federal and member of its Advisory Group.

In 2004 he was president of the International Society for the Systems Sciences. Until 2007 he was dean of Graduate School of Business Administration of IDEA (Management Development Institute of Argentina).

Herrscher is honor Professor ad vitam at Universidad del Centro del Provincia de Buenos Aires (Tandil), Universidad del Sur (Bahía Blanca), Universidad de La Plata, Universidad Nacional del Comahue (Neuquen), Universidad Nacional de la Patagonia San Juan Bosco ( Trelew and Comodoro Rivadavia), Universidad Nacional de La Pampa and several other Argentine Universities; Fulbright professor -in-residence at Sacramento State University(USA). Visiting Professor at University of San Diego.

== Work ==
=== International Society for the Systems Sciences ===
Herscher worked at the International Society for the Systems Sciences (ISSS). He was for several years chair and is now adjunct chair of the Special Integration Group for Systems Applications to Business and Industry. In the period 2002–2003 he was Vice President for Systems Education and Communication, and was the past President for the period July 2004 to July 2005. He coordinated at the 47th Annual Meeting of ISSS, together with Reynaldo Treviño and Roxana Cárdenas from Mexico, the Spanish Co-Laboratory of Democracy, conducted the pre-congress activities of this group in Argentina and continues to do so after the congress.

== Publications ==
Herrscher has written seven books (in English and Spanish), and about 100 articles. Books in English:

- 1967, Managerial Accounting, Buenos Aires: Ed. Macchi.
- 1988, Contingencies in the Cost, Buenos Aires: Ed. Tesis.
- 1992, The Economy of the Enterprise- walking the corporate trail, Buenos Aires: Ed. Galerna.
- 2000, Introduction to Business Administration – A Guide for Explorers of Organizational Complexity, Granica, 588 pages.
- 2002, Accounting and Management – A Systemic Approach to Action-Oriented Information, Macchi, 216 pages.
- 2003, Systemic Thinking – Walking the Road of Change or Changing the Road, Granica, 270 pages.
- 2005, Systemic Planning - a Strategic approach to managing under uncertainty, Ed Macchi.
