= Shinayakana Systems Approach =

Japanese systems approach

The Shinayakana Systems Approach is a systems approach for "solving the complex systems with ill-defined structure" proposed by Sawaragi, Nakayama and Nakamori in 1987. This approach is interactive, intelligent and interdisciplinary, and emphasizes honesty, humanity and harmony.

== History ==
The Shinayakana Systems Approach was the first approach in a wave of East Asian systems scientists theorizing about their systems methodologies in the last decade of the twentieth century using the concepts of intuition and group collaboration, which has resulted in several new approached to knowledge creation.

== The Name ==
"Shinayakana" is an adjective in Japanese, the closest translation to English is "supple." The meaning is something between hard and soft.

== The Approach ==
The Shinayakana Systems Approach tried to resolve the controversy between hard and soft systems methodologies, using the Eastern philosophy of yin and yang. The approach does not specify an algorithmic recipe for knowledge and technology creation, only a set of principles for systemic problem solving:

"Using intuition, keeping an open mind, trying diverse approaches and perspectives, being adaptive and ready to learn from mistakes, and being elastic like a willow but sharp as a sword - in short, Shinayakana."

This approach is an interactive, intelligent and interdisciplinary (I^{3}) system approach with emphasizing honesty, humanity and harmony (H^{3}).

=== Interactive ===
The Shinayakana Systems Approach limits the role of mathematical methods and models to that of problem solving support only because the authors believe that no model will ever incorporate all human concerns. The authors consider human-computer interaction to be essential:

"Models should be built interactively, involving not only analysts but also domai experts and decision makers. Their perceptions of the problem, the relevant data and the model validity should be taken into account in model building so that the model can express their goals and preferences definitely and correctly. The interaction is essential at the decision stage as well, and it should be dynamical. The interaction should be designed carefully only to support the thinking process of decision makers; it should not be a set of leading questions."

=== Intelligent ===
The authors also believe that for the element of interaction to be used to its full potential the support system is required to be intelligent. In other words, the system should have a base of knowledge in the area being considered.

"Frameworks of dynamical knowledge utilization should be designed so that we can not only retrieve data or knowledge, but also acquire or modify them interactively. The mechanism of knowledge acquisition has two aspects: one is knowledge recognition from the knowledge base or decision support environment, the second is knowledge association by the communication with knowledge base systems."

=== Interdisciplinary ===
The third "I" is that the problem solving should be interdisciplinary, not limiting ones problem solving group to one area of expertise, but using many different perspectives to reach a more holistic result.

=== The Three H's: Honesty, Humanity and Harmony ===
In addition to the three I's the approach uses three H's:

"Honesty in modeling the reality. Humanity in designing support systems. Harmony of the research group."

=== For more information ===
The books and papers below go in to more detail describing the Shinayakana Systems Approach.

- Sawaragi, Y. and Nakamori, Y. (1989) "Shinayakana" Systems Approach in Developing an Urban Environment Simulator. IIASA Working Paper. IIASA, Laxenburg, Austria, WP-89-008. http://pure.iiasa.ac.at/3336/
- Nakamori, Y. Knowledge and systems science: enabling systemic knowledge synthesis. Boca Raton: CRC Press, 2014. 39–40.
- Dolk, D., and Granat, J. Modeling for Decision Support in Network-based Services the Application of Quantitative Modeling to Service Science. Berlin: Springer, 2012. 264–70.

== i-System ==
The Shinayakana Systems Approach forms the basis of the i-system, which takes the I^{3} to I^{5} (intelligence, imagination, involvement, integration and intervention).

"Further development of the Shinayakana Systems Approach was given in Nakamori (2000), in a systemic and process-like approach to knowledge creation called Knowledge Pentagram System or i-System. The five ontological elements (or subsystems) of this system are Intervention (and the will to solve problems), Intelligence (and existing scientific knowledge), Involvement (and social motivation), Imagination (and other aspects of creativity), and Integration (using systemic knowledge). True to the Shinayakana tradition, there is no algorithmic recipe for how to move between these ontological nodes: all transitions are equally advisable, according to individual needs. Thus, i-System stresses the need to move freely between diverse dimensions of creative space."
