= Béla H. Bánáthy =

Hungarian linguist and systems scientist (1919–2003)

Béla Heinrich Bánáthy
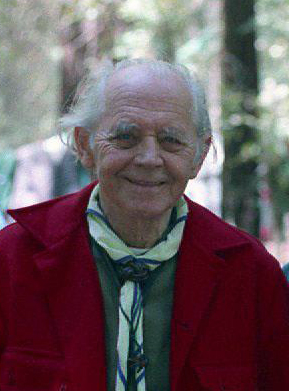
- Banathy in 1998
- Born: December 1, 1919; Gyula, Hungary
- Died: 4 September 2003 (aged 83); Chico, California, US
- Citizenship: American
- Occupations: Educator, systems scientist, professor, author
- Known for: President of IFSR, 1994–1998
- Spouse: Eva Balazs
- Children: 4, including Béla

Béla Heinrich Bánáthy (Hungarian: Bánáthy Béla; December 1, 1919 – September 4, 2003) was a Hungarian-American linguist, and Professor at San Jose State University and UC Berkeley. He is known as founder of the White Stag Leadership Development Program, established the International Systems Institute in 1982, and was co-founder of the General Evolutionary Research Group in 1984.

He grew up in largely rural Hungary and served in the Hungarian military during World War II. When Russia invaded Hungary in April 1945, he and his family fled to Allied-occupied Austria and lived in a displaced persons camp for six years. In 1951, they emigrated to Chicago, sponsored by the Presbyterian church. Within the year his former commanding officer suggested to the U.S. government that they hire Bánáthy as a Hungarian instructor at the Army Language School in Monterey, California. While living in Monterey, he founded the White Stag Leadership Development Program.

His program gained national attention, and the Boy Scouts of America conducted research into incorporating leadership training into its programs. The Boy Scouts of America's Wood Badge and junior leader training programs had until then focused primarily on Scoutcraft skills, not leadership. William "Green Bar Bill" Hillcourt among others resisted the change.

After 20 years, Bánáthy left the renamed Defense Language Institute and went to work for the Far West Laboratory for Research and Development in Berkeley and later San Francisco. He retired from Far West in 1989 but maintained an active interest in social systems and science, including attending many conferences and advising students and others in those fields. In 1992, he helped restart the Hungarian Scout Association within his native country. In 2003, Bánáthy and Eva moved to live with their son Tibor in Chico, California. After a brief and unexpected illness, Bánáthy died on September 4, 2003.

== Biography ==
Béla Bánáthy was born in 1919 in Gyula, Hungary, as the oldest of four sons. His father Peter was a minister of the Reformed Church in Hungary and his mother Hildegard Pallmann was a teacher. Peter Bánáthy had earned the honorary title Vitéz for his service during World War I, and Béla, as his oldest son, inherited the title.

=== Military service during World War II ===
In 1937, Bánáthy entered the hu:Ludovika Akadémia as was the custom for young men aspiring to military careers. In 1940, at age 21, he was commissioned as a Second Lieutenant in the armored infantry. Later that year he met his future wife Eva Balazs. The peacetime Hungarian Army received very little training. Bánáthy served two tours on the Russian front in World War II as an armored infantry officer. The Hungarian Army expanded rapidly from an initial force of 80,000, but when fighting started, the rank-and-file of the army had undergone only eight weeks of training.

In 1941, Bánáthy's unit advanced as part of German Army Group South to within 140 kilometres (87 mi) of Moscow, during a severe November ice storm. In 1942, as a soldier in the 109,000 strong Second Hungarian Army (Second Magyar Honved), Bánáthy returned to the Russian front. They fought in the Battle of Voronezh at the Don River bend, supporting the German attack. They were charged with protecting the 8th Italian Army's's northern flank between the Novaya Pokrovka on the Don River to Rossosh, part of the larger force defending the drive by the German 6th Army against Soviet General Vasily Chuikov's 62nd Army, which was defending Stalingrad. Bánáthy was seriously wounded during the action, and he returned from the front to Budapest where he spent seven months recuperating. He married his fiancé, Eva Balazs, with his arm in a sling on December 5, 1942 in Budapest.

Bánáthy was promoted as a junior officer of the Royal Hungarian Army and served on the faculty of the Ludovika Akademia under his mentor, Commandant Colonel-General Kisbarnaki General Farkas. Farkas sought a volunteer to teach junior leader training at the academy and Bánáthy volunteered. Farkas also asked Bánáthy to organize a Scout Troop for young men, 19 years and older, which was a common practice within the Hungarian Scout Association at the time. Bánáthy became committed to training the young men in officer's leadership skills; he served as the voluntary national director for youth leadership development and a member of the National Council of the Hungarian Scout Association.

In July 1944 Farkas was Commander of the Hungarian VI Army Corps, which had been garrisoned at Debrecen. He replaced General Beregfy, who was loyal to the fascist Arrow Cross Party. During that month, Farkas' VI Army Corps was instrumental in repelling a Red Army attack across the Carpathian Mountains. On 15 October 1944, Farkas was named commander of the Pest bridgehead and Government Commissioner for Evacuation. In early November 1944, the first Russian units appeared on the southeastern edge of Budapest. As an associate of Farkas, Bánáthy likely had advance notice of the Russian advance. He also knew he would likely be executed if captured. Bánáthy was able to get his wife Eva, one-year-old son Béla and two-week-old son László out of Budapest. Bánáthy's family, along with other officers and their families, found shelter at first in farmhouses, and later in bunkers, caves, and trenches.

When the Hungarian Second Army was disbanded on 1 December 1944 due to a lack of equipment and personnel, the remaining units of the Second Army, including Bánáthy's, were transferred to the Third Army. The siege of Budapest began when the city was encircled on 29 December 1944 by the Red Army. Bánáthy fought with the remainder of his unit against the Russians until after Budapest fell on 13 February 1945. The Axis was striving to protect the last oil fields they controlled in western Hungary around Lake Balaton. By late March 1945, most of what was left of the Hungarian Third Army was surrounded and destroyed about 40 kilometres (25 mi) to the west of Budapest in an advance by the Soviet 46th Army towards Vienna. The remaining shattered units fought on as they retreated progressively westward through the Transdanubian Mountains towards Austria.

Bánáthy's family and others of the remainder of his and other military units made their way west, along with tens of thousands of other refugees, about 250 kilometres (160 mi) into Austria, trying to stay ahead of advancing Russian troops. Temperatures through the time of their flight remained near 0 °C (32 °F).

=== Life in displaced persons camp ===
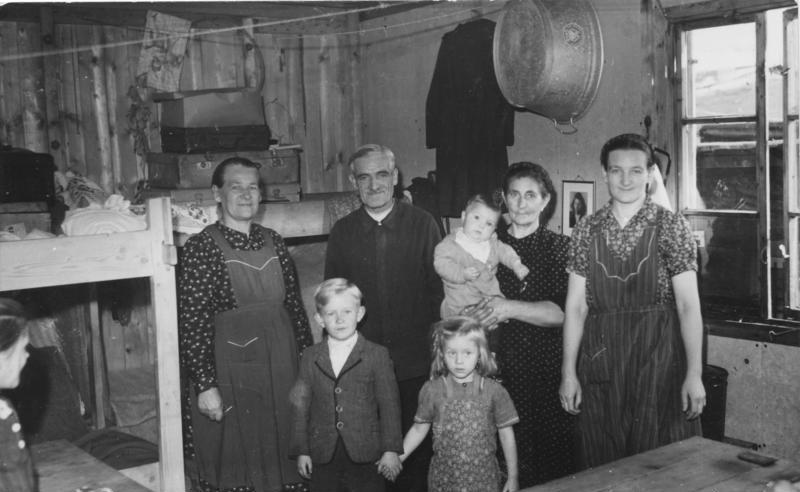
Refugee family in their quarters in Bavaria after the war ended in 1945.

Bánáthy reunited with his family in Austria. As the war ended and Austria was occupied in April 1945 by the French, British, Soviet and US military forces, the family was placed in an Allied displaced persons camp. They were housed in a single 6 by 10 feet (1.8 by 3.0 m) room in a wooden barrack; it served as their bedroom, kitchen, living room and firewood storage area. Food was extremely scarce and at times they subsisted on around 600 calories per person per day. They were among 1.4 million displaced persons in Austria at the time during a worldwide food shortage as a result of the war. Food was also severely restricted by punitive U.S. policies including directive JCS 1067. In 1947 German citizens were surviving on 1040 calories a day, but the Allies were also suffering from food shortages.

Bánáthy later traded for milk to give two-year-old Béla and one-year-old László enough protein. As extremely little food was available in the camps, in early 1947 his wife's twin sister came from Hungary to take their older two sons back to live with the older sister. The Pallendal family, Bánáthy's in-laws, was well-educated and relatively wealthy, so they had access to more food than what was available in the camps. They intended to return the Banathy boys to their parents within a year. Beginning in early 1948, when the Cold War ensued, it became virtually impossible for refugees or displaced persons to cross from the border of one country into another, or even from one Occupation Zone to another. The Pallendal family could not return the two boys from behind the Iron Curtain.

In 1948, shortly after their third son Tibor was born, the Banathy family was moved to another camp, near a Marshall Plan warehouse. Bánáthy was assigned to unload sacks of wheat from railroad cars. He contacted the World Scouting Movement for assistance and began to organize scouting in the DP camps. During 1947, Bánáthy was named the Hungarian Scout Commissioner for Austria; he led training for Hungarian Scout leaders along with his former commanding officer Farkas. He was ordained by the World Council of Churches and became minister for youth among Hungarian refugees. Banathy served as director of religious education of the Protestant Refugee Service of Austria, was editor of a religious youth service and of a Scout publication.

In 1948 Bánáthy's fourth son Robert was born. Bánáthy soon found work as a technical draftsman in the statistical office of a U.S. Army warehouse. In 1949, with help from a Swiss foundation, Bánáthy assisted in establishing and was selected as the President of the Collegium Hungaricum, a boarding school for refugees, at Zell am See near Saalfelden, Austria. In the same year, the Communist government in Hungary seized the businesses belonging to the Pallendal family. Because they were members of the social elite, the Communist government considered them to be a political threat.

In 1951, in what was a common practice during this time, the Hungarian Police arrived at dawn to seize the Pallendal family home and arrest and deport the family from Budapest. Seven-year-old Béla and six-year-old László Banathy, along with their Pallendal grandmother and two aunts, were put aboard a freight train and sent toward Russia. The train stopped occasionally and a few hundred people were forced off at rural towns. The Pallendal family was ejected in eastern Hungary. There an uncle located them and hid them from authorities in a small village.

=== Emigrates to the United States ===
In January, 1951, the student body of the Presbyterian McCormick Theological Seminary in Chicago sponsored Béla, Eva, Tibor and Robert Banathy as refugees to the United States. Bánáthy lived with his family at the Seminary, where he worked nights 60 hours a week shoveling coal to fire the Seminary furnace. At the same time, he was studying English from a book. He occasionally preached at nearby Hungarian churches. His wife found work as a machine operator and Tibor, their third son, entered American public school.

=== Begins teaching Hungarian ===
Bánáthy moved to Monterey in June 1951, a pivotal change in his life. At the Army Language School, he met Joseph Szentkiralyi (Americanized as St. Clair), the founder of the Hungarian Department. They soon figured out they had met at the 4th World Scout Jamboree in 1933. The wives of the two men also realized they had been girlhood friends in grammar school in Budapest. Using her experience managing the Pallendal family restaurant in Budapest before World War II, Eva took work as a waitress in a restaurant on the Monterey Peninsula. Bánáthy served as President of his local Parent-Teacher Association and on the board of the local Red Cross.

Eva Bánáthy greets her 11-year-old son László at San Francisco International Airport on September 17, 1956. They were separated in 1947 when László was one year old, when the boy and his brother were taken by her twin sister to live with their family in Hungary.

On February 28, 1956, Bánáthy was naturalized as a United States citizen. After nine years of separation, and repeated failures to get his sons repatriated from behind the Iron Curtain, Bánáthy obtained help from Dr. Eugene Blake, President of the National Council of Churches; Representative Charles M. Teague; Ernest Nagy, Vice Consul in the U.S. Legation in Budapest; Hulda Neiburh of the McCormick Theological Seminary; and Howard Pyle, deputy assistant to President Dwight D. Eisenhower. He was finally able to arrange for 13-year-old Béla and 11-year-old László to emigrate to the United States A photograph of the two boys greeting their mother was featured in Life Magazine.

Carrying pictures of their parents, two Hungarian brothers arrived at New York International Airport, Idlewild, Queens, yesterday... The pictures are necessary because the boys... have not seen their mother and father for nine years.

The boys were greeted by their parents at San Francisco International Airport at 1:10 a.m. The boys' release marked the first time since the Cold War that anyone under 65 years old had been allowed to leave Hungary to be reunited with family.

== Professional life ==
Bánáthy was an educator, a systems and design scientist, and an author. At the Army Language School, he taught in the Hungarian language department, later becoming its chairman.

=== White Stag Leadership Development Program ===
In 1957 Bánáthy began enlarging a concept for a leadership development program. As Council Training Chairman in the Monterey Bay Area Council of the Boy Scouts of America, he received strong support from the Council Executive and Council Executive Board for his proposal to train boys in leadership skills. He was assisted by fellow Hungarians Joe Szentkiralyi (aka St. Clair, Chair of the Hungarian Language Department at the Army Language school) and Paul Sujan (Hungarian Language Instructor at the Army Language school); Fran Peterson (a member of the National Council and a Scoutmaster from Chular, California); and Maury Tripp (a Scouter from Saratoga, California, a member of the National Council, and a research scientist). "Lord Baden-Powell was my personal idol and I long felt a commitment to give back to Scouting what I had received", Bánáthy said.

As part of his master's degree program in counseling psychology at San José State University, he wrote a thesis titled "A Design for Leadership Development in Scouting". This book described the founding principles of the White Stag program, which was later adapted by the National Council of the Boy Scouts of America. Prior to Bánáthy's work, the adult Wood Badge and the junior leader training programs had focused on teaching Scoutcraft skills and some aspects of the Patrol Method. His research and findings on teaching principles and competencies of leadership had a huge impact on these two programs, shifting their focus to leadership skills.

Some individuals on the national staff and many volunteers across the nation resisted the idea of changing the focus of Wood Badge from training leaders in Scoutcraft to leadership skills. Among them was William "Green Bar Bill" Hillcourt, who had been the first United States Wood Badge Course Director in 1948. Although officially retired, he had many loyal followers. He was adamant that Wood Badge should continue to teach Scoutcraft skills and tried to persuade the national council to stick to that tradition, but his objections were ignored.

The leadership competencies Banathy articulated became the de facto method for Scout adult and junior leader training. (In 2008, the White Stag program celebrated its 50th anniversary.) In 1960, the Monterey Bay Area Council recognized Béla for his exceptional service to youth and awarded him the Silver Beaver.

In the 1970s, due to the success of the White Stag program, Bánáthy was appointed to the Interamerican Scout Committee and participated in three interamerican "Train the Trainer" events in Mexico, Costa Rica, and Venezuela.

=== Systems science ===
In the 1960s Bánáthy began teaching courses in applied linguistics and systems science at San José State University. In 1962 he was named Dean and Chairman of the East Europe and Middle East Division at the Army Language School, overseeing ten language departments. In 1963 he completed his master's degree in psychology at San Jose State University, and in 1966 he received a doctorate in education for a transdisciplinary program in education, systems theory, and linguistics from the University of California, Berkeley. During the mid-1960s Bánáthy was named Chair of Western Division of the Society for General Systems Research. He published his first book, Instructional Systems, in 1968.

=== Large complex systems ===
During the 1960s and 1970s, Bánáthy was a visiting professor at the University of California, Berkeley, and as he continued teaching at San Jose State University. In 1969, he left the renamed Defense Language Institute and became a Program Director, and later Senior Research Director and Associate Laboratory Director, at the Far West Laboratory for Research and Development (now WestEd) in Berkeley (later moved to San Francisco). He "directed over fifty research and development programs, designed many curriculum projects and several large scale complex systems, including the design and implementation of a Ph.D. program in educational research and development for UC Berkeley".

In the 1970s and 1980s, he focused his research on the application of systems and design theories and methodologies in social, social service, educational, and human development systems. In the 1980s he developed and guided a Ph.D. curriculum in humanistic systems inquiry and social systems design for the Saybrook Graduate School.

=== General Evolutionary Research Group ===
In 1984, Bánáthy was co-founder with general evolution theorist Ervin László and others of the initially secret General Evolutionary Research Group, or General Evolutionary Research Group. A member of the Society of General Systems Research since the 1960s, he was Managing Director of the Society in the early 1980s, and in 1985 he became its president. He then served on its Board of Trustees. During the 1980s, he served on the Executive Committee of the International Federation of Systems Research. In 1989, he retired from Far West Labs and returned to live on the Monterey Peninsula. He continued to serve as Professor Emeritus for the Saybrook Graduate School, counseling Ph.D. students. He also continued his work with the annual ISI international systems design conversations, and authored a number of articles and books about systems, design, and evolutionary research. He served two terms as president of the International Federation of Systems Research during 1994-98.

He coordinated over twenty international systems research conferences held in eight countries, including the 1994 Conversation on Systems Design held at Fuschl Am See, Austria, sponsored by the International Federation of Systems Research. He was also honorary editor of three international systems journals: Systems Research and Behavioral Science, the Journal of Applied Systems Studies, and Systems. He was on the Board of Editors of World Futures, and served as a contributing editor of Educational Technology.

== Final years ==
In the summer of 2003 Bánáthy and his wife moved to live with their son Tibor in Chico, California. After a brief and unexpected illness, Bánáthy died on September 4, 2003. He and Eva had been married 64 years at the time of his death.

== See also ==
- Debora Hammond
- Systems philosophy
- Systemics
- Systems theory
- Systems thinking

== Publications ==
Bánáthy wrote and published several books and hundreds of articles. A selection:

- 1963, A Design for Leadership Development in Scouting, Monterey Bay Area Council, Monterey, California.
- 1964, Report on a Leadership Development Experiment, Monterey Bay Area Council, Monterey, California.
- 1968, Instructional Systems, Fearon Publishers. ISBN 978-0-8224-3930-1
- 1969, Leadership Development — World Scouting Reference Papers, No. 1, Boy Scouts World Bureau, Geneva, Switzerland.
- 1972, A Design for Foreign Language Curriculum, D.C. Heath. ISBN 978-0-669-82073-7
- 1973, Developing a Systems View of Education: The Systems Models Approach, Lear Siegler Fearon Publishers. ISBN 978-0-8224-6700-7
- 1985, with Kenneth D. Bailey et al. (ed.), Systems Inquiring: Applications, Volume II of the Proceedings of the Society for General Systems Research International Conference. Seaside, CA: Intersystems Publications.
- 1991, Systems Design of Education, A Journey to Create the Future, Educational Technology, Englewood Cliffs, NJ. ISBN 978-0-87778-229-2
- 1992, A Systems View of Education: Concepts and Principles for Effective Practice, Educational Technology, Englewood Cliffs, CA. ISBN 0-87778-245-8
- 1992, "Comprehensive Systems Design in Education: Building a Design Culture," in: Education. Educational Technology, 22(3) 33–35.
- 1996, Designing Social Systems in a Changing World, Plenum, NY. ISBN 0-306-45251-0
- 1998, Evolution Guided by Design: A Systems Perspective, in Systems Research, Vol. 15.
- 1997, A Taste of Systemics , The Primer Project, 2007.
- 2000, Guided Evolution of Society: A Systems View, Springer ISBN 978-0-306-46382-2
- 2000, The Development of the AgoraWebsite: Personal Communication to Agora Stewards, International Systems Institute, Asilomar Networked Democracy Group, Pacific Grove, CA.
- 2000, Agora Structure, International Systems Institute, Asilomar Networked Democracy Group, Pacific Grove, CA.
- 2000, Bio: Personal Communication to Agora Stewards, International Systems Institute, Asilomar Networked Democracy Group, Pacific Grove, CA.
- 2000, Story: Personal Communication to Agora Stewards, International Systems Institute, Asilomar Networked Democracy Group, Pacific Grove, CA.
- 2000, Reflections: The Circle of Agora Stewards, International Systems Institute, Asilomar Networked Democracy Group, Pacific Grove, CA.
- 2000, Guided Evolution of Society: A Systems View, Kluwer Academic/Plenum, New York.
- 2002, with Patrick M. Jenlink, "The Agora Project: the New Agoras of the Twenty-first Century," Systems Research and Behavioral Science
- 2002, with Gordon Rowland, "Guiding our evolution: If we don't do it, who will?"
- 2005, with Patrick M. Jenlink, et al. (ed.), Dialogue as a Means of Collective Communication (Educational Linguistics), Kluwer Academic/Plenum, New York. ISBN 978-0-306-48689-0
- 2007, with Patrick M. Jenlink, et al. (ed.), Dialogue as a Means of Collective Communication (Volume 2), Kluwer Academic/Plenum, New York. ISBN 978-0-387-75842-8
