= South American Business Forum =

Annual Argentinian business conference

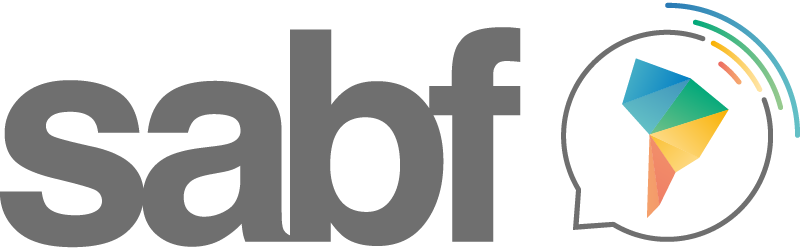
- South American Business Forum logo
- Frequency: Annually
- Locations: Buenos Aires, Argentina
- Inaugurated: 2004
- Most recent: 2025
- Participants: 100
- Filing status: Non-profit organisation
- Website: sabf.org.ar

The South American Business Forum, also known as 'SABF', is an annual conference that takes place at the Instituto Tecnológico de Buenos Aires in Buenos Aires, Argentina. The forum aims, through dialogue and the interaction between current leaders and future leaders, to make a contribution to the sustainable development of South America and the world.

The South American Business Forum was founded in 2005, and has been organized annually since then by students of the Instituto Tecnológico de Buenos Aires. The event gathers 100 university students from all around the world and 40 prominent international leaders from the academical, financial, political and social spheres.

== Meetings ==
In the SABF's past 20 meetings, students from more than 400 universities from over 150 countries participated. Students from universities such as Harvard University, Massachusetts Institute of Technology, London School of Economics and Universidad Autónoma de Madrid, among others have participated of the forum. Doug Casey (American-born economist and best-selling financial author), Viktor Klima (Former Chancellor of Austria), Nabeel Goheer, (Global Coordinator - Youth Entrepreneurship Development, International Labour Organization), Félix Luna (Argentinian Writer and Historian), Alexander Laszlo (systems scientist), Zino Haro (American-born entrepreneur, member of the World Economic Forum), Marcella Germano (Eisenhower Fellow), and Guy Sorman (President, Sorman Editions) are among those who have taken part of the event.

== Structure ==
The conference is structured around a central theme that reflects current global and regional challenges. Each edition explores this theme through a combination of keynote lectures, panel discussions, workshops, and small-group discussion sessions. These activities are designed to promote open dialogue, critical analysis, and collaborative problem-solving among participants with diverse academic and cultural backgrounds.

== Recognition and reputation ==
SABF has attracted speakers from diverse sectors, including senior executives of multinational corporations, public officials, entrepreneurs, academics, and leaders of international organizations. The participation of globally recognized figures has contributed to the forum's visibility and credibility within academic, business, and policy communities. In 2023, the Swiss-Argentine Chamber of Commerce recognized SABF with its Positive Actions award.
