= David Rousseau =

British systems philosopher (born 1960)

David Rousseau (born 1960) is a British systems philosopher, Director of the Centre for Systems Philosophy, former chair of the Board of Trustees of the International Society for the Systems Sciences (ISSS), a Past President of the ISSS (2017-2018), and the Company Secretary of the British Association for the Study of Spirituality. He is known for having revived interest in establishing a scientific general systems theory (GST), for promoting systems philosophy as a route to advances in GST, for contributions on scientific general systems principles and for advocating systems research as a route to a scientific understanding of spiritual and other exceptional human experiences. His research interests include systems philosophy, systems science, systems engineering, systems methods for exploratory research, the mind-body problem, and the ontological foundations of moral intuitions.
