= Debora Hammond =

American historian of science

- Born: 1951 (age 74–75)
- Education: University of California, Berkeley (PhD)
- Known for: Exploring the Genealogy of Systems Thinking (2002); The Science of Synthesis (2003)
- Scientific career
- Fields: Systems sciences systems theory
- Workplaces: Sonoma State University
- Doctoral advisor: Carolyn Merchant

Debora Hammond (born 1951) is an American historian of science, former Provost and Professor Emerita of Interdisciplinary Studies of the Hutchins School of Liberal Studies at the Sonoma State University. She is known as author of the 2003 book The Science of Synthesis: Exploring the Social Implications of General Systems Theory, and as 2005–06 President of International Society for the Systems Sciences.

== Biography ==
Debora Hammond received a B.A. in History in 1974 at Stanford University. After teaching at the secondary level in Colorado and on the Hopi Reservation, she returned to graduate school in 1989 to study History of Science at the University of California, Berkeley. In 1991 she received an M.A. and completed her Ph.D. in 1997 with Professor Carolyn Merchant.

Her dissertation research focused on the history of systems thinking, specifically the lives and work of the five founders of the Society for General Systems Research: Ludwig von Bertalanffy, Kenneth Boulding, Ralph Gerard, James Grier Miller, and Anatol Rapoport. Her research was motivated by an interest in exploring ways of thinking about complex systems that might support more participatory and inclusive forms of social organization.

Beginning in 1996, while completing her dissertation, she taught part-time in the Hutchins School of Liberal Studies at the Sonoma State University, where she was hired full-time in 1997. In addition to teaching courses in the lower division integrated general education sequence, she has taught upper division seminars on such topics as The Global Food Web; Oikos: Ecology and Economics; Water Matters; Health and Healing; The Dharma of Complex Systems; Technology, Ecology, and Society; and the Systems View of the World. Her teaching revolves around the core issues of ecological sustainability and social justice, exploring how to create a healthy society that works for everyone. She was promoted to Full Professor of Interdisciplinary Studies in 2008 and retired in May 2017.

In 2005 Hammond participated in the Complex Systems Summer School at Santa Fe Institute. In 2005–2006, she served as President of International Society for the Systems Sciences (ISSS), hosting the annual meeting at the Sonoma State University. Her primary purpose was to enhance the quality of the conference program by integrating contemporary developments in the field of complex systems. Beginning in 2010, she took on the leadership of the Organization Development MA Program at Sonoma State.

Debora Hammond finds much of her inspiration in the wilderness, which is reflected in her work on environmental philosophy and ethics. She believes that social justice depends upon our ability to find more harmonious ways of living with the natural world. This is reflected in her work from 2005 to 2007 as coordinator of the Northern California Earth Institute, which nurtures community dialogue on themes relating to the environment and sustainable living.

== Publications ==
Hammond has written and edited several articles and papers and one book:

- 2003. The Science of Synthesis: Exploring the Social Implications of General Systems Theory, Colorado: University Press of Colorado, June 2003.

Articles (selection)

- "From Dominion to Co-Creation: A New Vision of Reality beyond the Boundaries of the Mechanistic Universe," ReVision: A Journal of Consciousness and Transformation 21:4 (1999).
- "Exploring the Genealogy of Systems Thinking," Systems Research and Behavioral Science 19 (2002).
- "Ecopsychology," in Krech III, Shepard; Merchant, Carolyn; McNeill, John Robert, eds. (2004). Encyclopedia of World Environmental History. Routledge.
- "Reflections on the Role of Dialogue in Education and Community Building," Systems Research and Behavioral Science 21 (Bela H. Banathy Festschrift, 2004).
- "Philosophical and Ethical Foundations of Systems Thinking," tripleC - Cognition, Communication, Co-operation, Vol 3, No 2 (2005). On-line.
- "The Life and Work of James Grier Miller" (primary author, with Jennifer Wilby), Systems Research and Behavioral Science 23 (2006).
- "Education for Engaged Citizenship,” in John P. van Gigch, ed., Wisdom, Knowledge, and Management: A Critique and Analysis of Churchman's Systems Approach Series: C. West Churchman's Legacy and Related Works, Vol. 2 (New York: Springer, 2006).
- "Systems Theory," Encyclopedia of Philosophy and the Social Sciences. Sage Publications, 2013.
- "Reflections on Recursion and the Evolution of Learning," Kybernetes 42:9, 2013.
- "Systems Theory and Practice in Organizational Change and Development," in D. Arnold, ed., Traditions of Systems Theory: Major Figures and Contemporary Developments, Routledge, 2014.
- "Philosophical Foundations for Systems Research," in M. Edson, et al., ed., A Guide to Systems Research: Philosophy, Processes and Practice, Springer. 2016.
- "All Our Relations: Reflections on Women, Nature and Science," in E. Allison, W. Bauman, and K. Worthy, eds., After the Death of Nature: Carolyn Merchant and the Future of Human-Nature Relations, Routledge, 2018.
