= Beverly Foit-Albert =

American architect

Beverly Foit-Albert (born April 28, 1938) is an American architect. She is the co-author of China's Sacred Sites.

== Personal and education ==
Beverly Foit-Albert was born on April 28, 1938, in Buffalo, New York. She received a Bachelor of Architecture from Cornell University. Following graduation, she married Joseph Cox and had three children. She went on to earn a Master of Architecture from the State University of New York, Buffalo. She then received a Doctor of Philosophy in Human Science, Saybrook Institute.

She is married to Joseph Cox, an engineer; the couple have 3 children.

== Writing ==
With Nan Shunxun, Foit-Albert wrote the 2007 book China's Sacred Sites, which examines differences between Chinese and Western religious architecture. Publishers Weekly called the book's photography "a feast for the eyes, not just the soul", while Library Journal summarized the book as "an excellent introduction, description, and explanation of traditional Eastern religious architecture".

== Practice ==
Foit-Albert, has been practicing architecture for more than 40 years. She began the architectural firm Foit-Albert Associates with two other young architects in 1977. Her firm helped to revitalize Downtown Buffalo and emphasized its historic areas. Some of her notable building projects include the M. Wile building, Richardson Complex, Central Terminal and buildings in the Cobblestone District which are among the landmarks that have benefited from her professional and educational expertise. She served on the American Institute of Architects board of directors from 1990 to 1993.

She was part of the teaching staff at the School of Architecture at the State University at Buffalo when it opened in 1969, and has taught at the school many semesters since.

Foit-Albert has a special interest in the reuse of old urban buildings. Her firm's office is in an old structure built by the Spaulding family. The ground floor, which had housed a post office branch, was renovated into office space, and the 20 apartments above were redesigned. She has redesigned a series abandoned and deteriorating inner-city churches, sometimes converting part of a large church into office space, while creating a smaller space for the congregation.
