= John Milsum =

Canadian control engineer

John H. Milsum (August 15, 1925 – November 9, 2008) was a Canadian control engineer who was Professor and first Director at the Biomedical Engineering Department of the McGill University in Montreal, and a professor at the University of British Columbia. Milsum is known for his book "Biological Control Systems Analysis" from 1966, which is a classic in the field and has been translated into many languages.

== Biography ==
Milsum was born in England. He received his Ph.D. in 1957 in control engineering at the Massachusetts Institute of Technology.

He started working at the National Research Council in Ottawa from 1950 to 1961. In 1961 he came to McGill as the first Abitibi professor of control engineering in the Department of Electrical Engineering. In 1972 Milsum moved to the University of British Columbia (UBC) to become the Imperial Oil professor of General Systems and a professor in the Department of Health Care and Epidemiology. He was instrumental in the creation of UBC's Institute of Health Promotion Research in 1990.

He was president of the International Society for the Systems Sciences in 1967-68. And he was a member of the National Research Council in Ottawa.

In 1986, he was bestowed the honour of Emeritus Member of the Canadian Medical and Biological Engineering Society.

Milsum died peacefully at home in 2008 November, at age 83.

== Publications ==
- 1955. Preliminary investigation of transient cooling of aircraft electronic equipment using heat storage material. with William G. Nance.
- 1957. Problems in optimizing of stochastically-disturbed, saturating regulators, employing a binary error criterion. Thesis Sc.D., Massachusetts Institute of Technology, Dept. of Mechanical Engineering.
- 1966. Biological Control Systems Analysis. McGraw Hill ISBN 978-0-07-042398-5
- 1968. Positive Feedback. (editor) Pergamon Press Ltd.
- 1984. Health, stress, and illness : a systems approach. New York : Praeger.

Articles:

- 1972, "The Hierarchical Basis for Living Systems," in George J. Klir (ed.), Trends in General Systems Theory. New York. 1972.
- 1973, "On Optimization of Health Care Systems". in: Optimization Techniques 1973: 335-346
- 1973, "Hospital admission systems: their evaluation and management". with E. Turban and I. Vertinsky in: Management Science.
- 1985, "A model of the eustress system for health/illness". in: Behavioral Science. Vol 30, Issue 4, Pages 179 - 186.
