= John A. Dillon =

John Andrew Dillon Jr. (1923 – February 22, 2005) was an American physicist, administrator, professor at the University of Louisville, and founder and first director of the Systems Science Institute at the University of Louisville.

== Biography ==
John Dillon served in the U.S. Army Air Forces during the course of the war, where he worked on the development of Radar systems and guided missiles. After the war, Dillon returned to his education, receiving a BS in physics at Fordham University and an MS and Ph.D. in 1954 from Brown University.

In 1954 Dillon joined the faculty at Brown University, where in 1963 he got promoted to full professor and chair of the Brown Physics Department. In 1966 he went to the University of Louisville as dean of the graduate school, where he taught physics until he retired in 1986. He also was dean of graduate studies until 1990 at Spalding University, where he had previously been provost. In 1986, he was awarded the title of Distinguished Teaching Professor and became an associate in the department of community health of the school of medicine.

From 1972 until 1978 Dillon was vice president of academic affairs at the University of Louisville. In 1979, Dillon established the interdisciplinary Systems Science Institute, and became university coordinator for energy and environmental affairs, In 1956 Dillon was among the first scientists to join the Society for General Systems Research, now International Society for the Systems Sciences, where in 1985 he served as president.

== Publications ==
Books

- 1949. The Electrolytic Polishing of Silver Single Crystals. Brown University.
- 1954. Adsorption of Carbon Dioxide on Nickel Single Crystal Surfaces. Brown University.
- 1981. Paradigms in changing times : proceedings of the Tenth Annual Conference of the Southeastern Region, April 21–23, 1981. Edited by Rammohan K. Ragade, John A. Dillon Jr.; sponsored by Systems Science Institute, University of Louisville.
- 1982. Energetics and Systems. Edited with W.J. Mitsch, R.K. Ragade and R.W. Bosserman. Ann Arbor Science Publishers, Ann Arbor.
- 1982. Foundations of general systems theory. Intersystems Publications.

Articles

- 1972. "Research and the Universities". With James W. McGrath and Dale C. Ray. In: The Journal of Higher Education, Vol. 43, No. 4 (April 1972), pp. 257–266
- 1980. "The Evolution of the American Urban University". In: Urban Education, Vol. 15, No. 1, 33–48 (1980)
