= Béla A. Bánáthy =

American systems scientist

Béla Antal Bánáthy (born 1943 in Budapest, Hungary) is an American systems scientist, who teaches part-time at the International Systems Institute at the Saybrook Graduate School.

== Biography ==
Bánáthy received his B.S. from California State University, Fresno in 1965, his M.S. in Information Science from Washington State University in 1969, and his Ph.D. in Educational Administration from the U.C. Berkeley, in 1991.

In 1969 he started working at the Monterey Peninsula College, where he chaired the Department of Computer Science and Information Systems from 1973 to 1997. From 1974 to 1990 he served as Director of the Computer Center. He joined Saybrook Graduate School as an adjunct faculty member in 1993 and teaches courses in Systems Inquiry.

Bánáthy has been an active member of the International Society for the Systems Sciences (ISSS), and has served as Chair of the ISSS Council, Chair of the special interest group on Information Systems Design, on the Editorial Board of Applied Systems Studies, Organizational Transformation & Social Change, and the International Journal of Information Technologies & the Systems Approach. He was President of ISSS in 1999. He is a Research Fellow of the International Systems Institute, a member of the General Evolutionary Research Group, Member of the Executive Board of the Institute for 21st Century Agoras, and is working with the Foundations of Information Science research group. Béla A. Bánáthy is the son of systems scientist Béla H. Bánáthy.

== Work ==
Bánáthy's research interests are in the fields of "the general theories of systems, theories of evolution, the foundations of information science, design of information systems, and design of social systems". His research in the new millennium has focussed on the "relationship between the ontological and epistemological aspects of complex systems, and the development of a corresponding approach to ecological as well as socio-cultural informatics".

== Publications ==
Bánáthy has published "several articles in systems related publications including: Behavioral Science, BioSystems, Cybernetics and Systems, Information Systems Architecture and Technology, Systems Practice, Systems Research, and World Futures". A selection:

- 1990, Proc. of the ISSS Int. Society for the Systems Sciences 34th Annual Conference, Béla H. Bánáthy, & B. A. Banathy (Eds.), Portland, Oregon, 8–13 July 1990.
- 1991, Examining performance in community colleges: Data envelopment analysis as a means of increasing the domain of inquiry, Ph.D. dissertation, University of California, Santa Barbara.
- 1999, Proceedings of the 43rd Annual Conference of the International Society for the Systems Sciences, (eds.) Asilomar, CA, June 26 - July 2, 1999

Articles:

- 1996, "Design learning resources". with: Jenks, L., Banathy, B. H., Christakis, A., Frantz, T., Hood, P., & Rowland, G. In G. Rowland (Ed.), Proceedings of the seventh international conversation on social systems design (pp. 18–35). Carmel, CA: International Systems Institute.
- 1997, "Information, evolution, and change", in: Journal Systemic Practice and Action Research. Springer Issue Volume 10, Number 1 / February, 1997.
- 1999, "An information typology for the understanding of social systems", In Systems Research and Behavioral Science 16(6), pp 479–494.
- 2000, "Navigating bounded and unbounded species" in: Sys. Res. 17 pp 481–484.
