= John Kineman =

American ecologist

John Jay Kineman (born 1949) is an American physical scientist and theoretical ecologist, affiliated with the Cooperative Institute for Research in the Environmental Sciences (CIRES) at the University of Colorado Boulder, Past President of the International Society for the Systems Sciences (ISSS), and Fellow of the Sri Sathya Sai Center for Human Values in Puttaparthi, India; known for his work in the fields of Geographical information systems, ecological characterization, ecological niche modeling, Complex Systems Theory, and Vedic Studies.

== Biography ==
Kineman obtained his BSc degree in Earth physics from the University of California, Los Angeles in 1972. After seventeen years of public service, in 1989, he obtained an interdisciplinary MSc degree at the University of Colorado, Boulder, combining environmental science and ecology. In 2007 he obtained his PhD in Environmental Studies (Ecosystem Science, Policy, and Ethics) also from the University of Colorado, Boulder.

After his graduation from the University of California Los Angeles in 1972, Kineman started his career at the National Oceanic and Atmospheric Administration (NOAA), working as officer and scientist in various assignments in oceanographic research at sea collecting geophysical, oceanographic, and climate data, Solar Forecaster at the Space Environment Services Center in Boulder, CO, and member of the NOAA-Coast Guard Spilled Oil Research Team (SOR Team) a research unit of the Outer Continental Shelf Environmental Assessment Program (OCSEAP), publishing a one year study of the 'Tsesis' oil spill in the Baltic as his Masters Dissertation. He joined the Kenya Wildlife Conservation and Management Department of the Ministry of Environment and Tourism (later reorganized under Richard Leakey as the Kenya Wildlife Service) in 1987 as a Senior Research Warden through the US Peace Corps, and later helped conduct the 1981 census of Mountain Gorillas in 1981 under the direction of Dr. Sandy Harcourt at Dian Fossey's Karisoke Research Center in Rwanda. He then began postgraduate research in ecology and returned to public service in NOAA at the National Geophysical Data Center (NGDC), developing distribution modeling techniques and ecological characterization datasets for emerging USA and International global change programs, and led development of the Data and Information Management component of a new NOAA "Center for Ecosystems Health" in Charleston, SC. In 1997 he joined CIRES at the University of Colorado, where he has continued as a senior research scientist since retiring from government service in 2005. Extending the work of Dr. Robert Rosen (mathematical biologist), he completed his Ph.D. in the Department of Environmental Studies in 2007, focused on ecological informatics, niche modeling, and complex systems theory, which he continued in post-doc research through a Fulbright grant to India 2007-2008, working as Honorary Adjunct Fellow at the Ashoka Trust for Research in Ecology and Environment (ATREE). Continuing research in both India and the USA to develop a theory of natural system wholeness, he published his first synthesis of Rosen's relational theory in 2011, which he later called "R-Theory" or "Relational Holon Theory", finding surprisingly deep correlations with ancient Vedic concepts of whole nature. In 2020 he co-published an update of the general synthesis in two parts with his original PhD mentor Dr. Carol Wessman. He has been a visiting professor at the Indian Institute of Sciences in Bangalore (Karnataka), the Sri Sathya Sai Institute of Higher Learning in Puttaparthi (Andhra Pradesh), and Vignan's University in Vadlamudi (Andhra Pradesh). Kineman was elected President of the International Society for the Systems Sciences in the year 2015-2016, producing the annual ISSS conference on the dual theme: Realizing Sustainable Futures in Socioecological Systems (US) and Leadership for Sustainable Socioecological Systems (India).

== Selected publications ==
- John J. Kineman and Bradley O. Parks (eds.), Ecological characterization : recommendations of a science review panel: workshop held March 9–10, 1995, at the National Center for Atmospheric Research in Boulder, Colorado.
- Rosen, Judith, and John Jay Kineman. "Anticipatory systems and time: a new look at Rosennean complexity." Systems Research and Behavioral Science 22.5 (2005): 399-412.
- Kineman, John J. "Relational science: a synthesis." Axiomathes 21.3 (2011): 393-437.
- Kineman, John J. (December 2017). "A causal framework for integrating contemporary and Vedic holism". Progress in Biophysics and Molecular Biology. 131: 402–423. doi:10.1016/j.pbiomolbio.2017.09.011. PMID 28943341.
- Krupanidhi, Srirama; Madhan Sai, N.; Leung, Homan; Kineman, John J. (September 2017). "The Leaf as a Sustainable and Renewable System: The Leaf as a Sustainable and Renewable System". Systems Research and Behavioral Science. 34 (5): 564–576. doi:10.1002/sres.2487.
- Kineman, John (2019). "Science of a Living Universe". Proceedings of the 63rd Annual Meeting of the ISSS - 2019 Corvallis, OR, USA.
- Kineman, J. J., & Wessman, C. A. Relational Systems Ecology: Holistic Ecology and Causal Closure. In G. Metcalf, H. Deguchi, & K. Kijima (Eds.), Handbook of Systems Sciences. Springer (2020).
- Kineman, J. J., & Wessman, C. A. Relational Systems Ecology: The Anticipatory Niche and Complex Model Coupling. In G. Metcalf, H. Deguchi, & K. Kijima (Eds.), Handbook of Systems Sciences. Springer (2020).
