= General Systems =

General systems: Yearbook of the Society for the Advancement of General Systems Theory
- Discipline: General System Theory, Systems Science
- Language: English
- Edited by: Anatol Rapoport (1956- ), Ludwig von Bertalanffy (1956- ), Richard L. Meier (1961)

Publication details
- History: 1956-1987 (vol. 1-32) annual, after 1987 as a special issue of Systems Research and Behavioral Science, (part 5, Sept./Oct.)
- Publisher: Society for General Systems Research (USA: Washington, D.C., 1968-1976; Louisville, Ky., 1977- ; New York, NY, USA -1988; Louisville, Ky., 1989-)
- Frequency: Annual

Standard abbreviations
- ISO 4: Gen. Syst.

Indexing
- ISSN: 0072-0798
- LCCN: 62000913
- OCLC no.: 1429672
- ISSN: 0097-336X

Links
- Journal homepage

General Systems: Yearbook of the Society for General Systems Research, known as General Systems, is the first annual journal in the field of systems science initiated in 1956, and initially edited by Ludwig von Bertalanffy and Anatol Rapoport.

Since 1998, it has been published as issue 5 of Systems Research and Behavioral Science.

== Overview ==
General Systems has been the first journal of the Society for General Systems Research published independently until the 1980s. Ever since it has been published as one of the items of the Systems Research and Behavioral Science. The journal started as a selecting of publications by several of the "foundational authors of the systems sciences", and contains some of the classic works in the field of systems theory, such as:

- Ludwig von Bertalanffy, "General Systems Theory," in General Systems Yearbook 1 (1956),
- Kenneth Boulding, "General Systems Theory -- The Skeleton of Science," General Systems Yearbook, I (1956), pp. 11–17.
- W. Ross Ashby, "General systems theory as a new discipline," General Systems Yearbook, 3, (1958).
- Charles A. McClelland, "Systems and History in International Relations," General Systems Yearbook, III (1958).

The General Systems Yearbook also contains examples of the third kind of general systems activity — creating new laws and refining old.

In 1998, the General Systems Yearbook was transitioned to be included each year as issue 5 of Systems Research and Behavioral Sciences.

== See also ==
- List of journals in systems science
