= Thomas Louis Hanna =

Philosophy professor (1928–1990)

Thomas Louis Hanna (November 21, 1928 – July 29, 1990) was a philosophy professor and movement theorist who coined the term somatics in 1976. He called his work Hanna Somatic Education. He proposed that most negative health effects are due to what he called Sensory Motor Amnesia. He claimed that many common age-related ailments are not simply a matter of time but the result of poor movement habits.

== Life ==
Thomas Hanna was born in Nov. 21, 1928 in Waco, Texas, the son of Winifred Hanna and John Dwight Hanna, a traveling representative for a pharmaceutical firm. He went to Waco High School. In 1949, Thomas Hanna earned a bachelor's degree in theology from Texas Christian University. The following year he married Susan Taft on 12 May 1950. They went to Paris and Thomas Hanna served as Director at Jean de Beauvais Club of the University of Paris.

Returning to the US he earned a Bachelors of Divinity at the University of Chicago by 1954 and went on to get his PhD in philosophy and divinity in 1958. He went on to lecture and research at different universities, first at Hollins College in Roanoke, Virginia and as a guest teacher at the University of North Carolina, Duke University, Paris, Brussels, Mainz and Guadalajara. From 1965 to 1973 he was Professor and chairman at the philosophy department of the University of Florida. In 1974 he remarried to Eleanor Criswell Hanna, the founding director of the Humanistic Psychology Institute. He died on 29 July 1990 in a car accident in Sonoma. His wife continued to teach his work following his death.

== Somatics ==
At the University of Florida, Hanna studied neurology and developed the idea that all life experiences lead to physical patterns in the body. In 1969, he published these ideas in his book "Bodies in Revolt: A Primer in Somatic Thinking". Moving to San Francisco in 1973, he was introduced to the Functional Integration of Moshé Feldenkrais and in 1975 he participated in the first Feldenkrais course in the United States. Hanna became director of the Humanistic Psychology Institute (later renamed into Saybrook Institute) in 1973. Together with his new wife Eleanor Criswell Hanna, they started the Novato Institute for Somatic Research and Training in 1975 and published the new journal "Somatics: Magazine-Journal of the Bodily Arts and Sciences". It provided a new venue where the ideas of Somatics could be discussed. He developed his ideas and published them in Somatics: Reawakening The Mind's Control Of Movement, Flexibility, And Health in 1988. He proclaimed that it's possible to age without chronic stiffness, bad back, chronic pain, fatigue, and that even high blood pressure don't occur if we maintain conscious control of nerves and muscles. He claimed that we can relearn abilities lost due to Sensory Motor Amnesia and develop what he calls Sensory-Motor Awareness. In 1990 he started his own training program at the Novato Institute to teach Hanna Somatic Education.

== Publications ==
- Hanna, Thomas L. (1958). The Thought and Art of Albert Camus. Regnery Company.
- Hanna, Thomas L. (1962). The Bergsonian Heritage. Columbia University Press.
- Hanna, Thomas L. (1962). The Lyrical Existentialists. Atheneum.
- Hanna, Thomas L. (1970). Bodies in Revolt: A Primer in Somatic Thinking. Holt, Rinehart and Winston.
- Hanna, Thomas L. (1976). The End of Tyranny: An Essay on the Possibility of America. Freeperson Press.
- Hanna, Thomas L. (1979). Explorers of humankind. Harper & Row.
- Hanna, Thomas L. (1980). The Body of Life: Creating New Pathways for Sensory Awareness and Fluid Movement. Knopf.
- Hanna, Thomas L. (1988). Somatics: Reawakening the Mind's Control of Movement, Flexibility, and Health. Da Capo Press.
- Hanna, Thomas L. (1991). Letters from Fred: A Novel. Freeperson Press.
- Hanna, Thomas L. (1995). "What is Somatics?" In Don Hanlon Johnson, ed., Bone, Breath and Gesture. 341–53. Berkeley: North Atlantic.

Publications on Hanna Somatic Education

- Criswell-Hanna, Eleanor. (1985). Biofeedback & Somatics: Toward Personal Evolution. Freeperson Press.
- Criswell-Hanna, Eleanor. (1989). How Yoga Works: Introduction to Somatic Yoga. Freeperson Press.
- Criswell-Hanna, Eleanor. (2010). CRAM's Introduction to Surface Electromyography, Jones & Bartlett Learning; 2 edition.
- Jim Dreaver. (1997). Somatic Technique: A Simplified Method of Releasing Chronically Tight Muscles and Enhancing Mind/body Awareness. Kendall Hunt Pub Co.
- Gold, Lawrence. (1997). Handbook of Assisted Pandiculation. Self-published.
- Gold, Lawrence. (1999). Guidebook of Somatic Transformational Exercises. Self-published.
- Gold, Lawrence. (2001). Body Meditations. Self-published.
- Gold, Lawrence. (2004). Deeper Lovemaking: Move Freely, Enhance Your Sensuality, and Prolong Your Intimate Occasions. Self-published.
- Gold, Lawrence. (2010). Magic of Somatics. Self-published.
- Gold, Lawrence. (2010). Free Yourself from Back Pain. Self-published.
- Craig Williamson. (2007). Muscular Retraining for Pain-Free Living: A Practical Approach to Eliminating Chronic Back Pain, Tendonitis, Neck and Shoulder Tension, and Repetitive Stress Injuries. Trumpeter.
- Noreen Owens. (2009). Where Comfort Hides. Xlibris.
- John Loupos. (2011). The Sustainable You: Somatics and the Myth of Aging. Langdon Street Press.
- Martha Peterson. (2011). Move Without Pain. Dragon Door Publications.
- James Knight. (2012). Gentle Yoga through Somatic Exploration Workbook. Self-published.
- Graeme Lynn. (2015). Manner of Action: Understanding and Practicing The Alexander Technique, The Feldenkrais Method and the Hatha Yoga, as Methods of Somatic Learning. Branden Books.
- Warren (St. Pierre), Sarah. (2015). Why We're in Pain: Why chronic musculoskeletal pain occurs - and how it can be prevented, alleviated and eliminated with Clinical Somatic Education. Self-published.
- Warren (St. Pierre), Sarah. (2019). The Pain Relief Secret: How to Retrain Your Nervous System, Heal Your Body, and Overcome Chronic Pain. TCK Publishing.
- Hill, Suresha. (2016). Somatic Intelligence: What Every Body is Dying for You To Know. One Sky Productions.
- Hill, Suresha. (2016). Somatic Intelligence: The Conversation Every Body Wants to Have with You. One Sky Productions.
- Hill, Suresha. (2018). Opposing Gravity: How to Recognize and Recover from Head Injuries. One Sky Productions.

== See also ==
- Somatics
