= J. Donald R. de Raadt =

J. Donald R. de Raadt (born 1946) is a Swedish organizational theorist and Professor Emeritus in Informatics and System Science at Luleå University of Technology.

== Biography ==
J. Donald R. de Raadt studied Economics and Politics at the University of Queensland, where he received a Bachelor of Arts, and later studied at the Royal Melbourne Institute of Technology where he first obtained his post-graduate Fellowship Diploma in Management and then his Masters in Business. He obtained a Ph.D. in Sociology from La Trobe University, Melbourne.

Over a period of fourteen years, he worked in information systems and corporate planning for a shipbuilder, two computer manufacturers and an insurance company. Prior to taking his present appointment in Sweden, he has held academic posts at the Royal Melbourne Institute of Technology in Australia and at Idaho State University in the USA. He was conferred the title of professor by the Swedish government in 1992 and held a chair in Informatics and System Science at Luleå University of Technology for twelve years until 2004.

He has served as president of the International Society for the Systems Sciences from 1994–1995, and of the Swedish Operational Research Society, and vice-president of the International Federation for Systems Research in Vienna.

In 1985 he received the Sir Geoffrey Vickers Memorial Award of the Society for General Systems Research and in 1988 he was selected as the outstanding researcher of the College of Business at Idaho State University.

== Publications ==
He is the author of several books and articles. A selection:

- 1991. Information and Managerial Wisdom. Idaho, Paradigm.
- 1997. A New Management of Life. Lampeter, Wales, Mellen.
- 2000. Redesign and Management of Communities in Crisis. Parklands, Florida, Universal Publishers.
- 2001. A Method and Software for Designing Viable Social Systems. Parklands, Florida, Universal Publishers.
- 2002. Ethics and Sustainable Community Design.
