= Ervin László =

Hungarian philosopher, theorist and pianist (1932–2026)

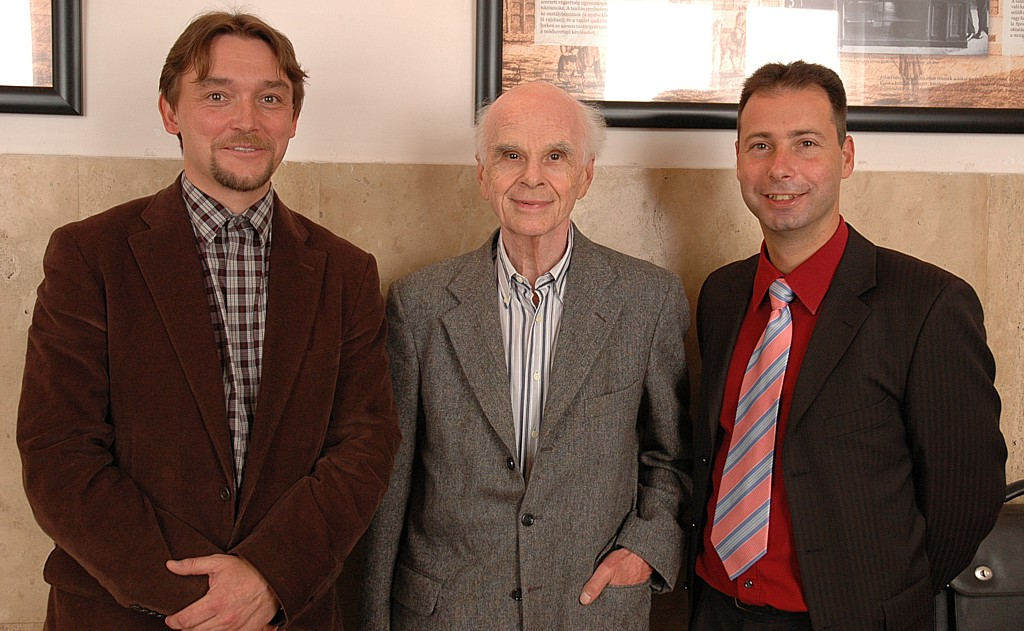
- László (center) with Tamás Paulinyi (left) and Bence László Tarr (right), circa 2007
- Born: 12 June 1932; Budapest, Hungary
- Died: 29 June 2026 (aged 94); Cecina, Italy
- Citizenship: Hungarian; American
- Known for: Quantum consciousness; Akashic field; Evolutionary Systems Theory
- Spouse: Carita Jägerhorn (m. 1956)
- Children: 2
- Awards: honorary doctorate from University of Pécs
- Scientific career
- Fields: Philosophy; Systems theory; Integral theory

Ervin László (Hungarian: [ˈɛrvin ˈlaːsloː]; 12 June 1932 – 29 June 2026) was a Hungarian-American philosopher of science, systems theorist, integral theorist and classical pianist. He was an advocate of the theory of quantum consciousness.

== Background ==
László was born in Budapest, Hungary on 12 June 1932. His father was a shoe manufacturer, and his mother played the piano.

He started playing the piano when he was five years old. His first piano concert was with the Budapest Symphony Orchestra when he was nine years old.

After World War II, László relocated to the United States.

== Career ==
László was a visiting faculty member at the Graduate Institute in Bethany, Connecticut. He published about 75 books and over 400 papers, and was editor of World Futures: The Journal of General Evolution.

He participated in the Stock Exchange of Visions project in 2006. In 2010, he was elected an external member of the Hungarian Academy of Sciences.

In Hungary, the minister of environment appointed Laszlo as one of the leaders of the ministry's campaign concerning global warming.

== Personal life and death ==
László married Carita Jägerhorn af Spurila on 16 November 1956. One of their two sons is Alexander Laszlo. He died on 29 June 2026, at the age of 94.

== Work ==
=== Systems theory ===
László became a leading exponent of Ludwig von Bertalanffy’s general systems theory. László viewed systems theory not only as scientifically important; he also saw in it the potential to establish an objective basis for humanist values, deriving from a consideration of a natural systems hierarchy and its evolution. In his opinion, “The ethics and natural philosophy of this new world view can help explicate and justify an emerging supranational social ethos: ‘reverence for natural systems’.”

=== General Evolutionary Research Group ===
In 1984, László was co-founder with Béla H. Bánáthy, Riane Eisler, John Corliss, Francisco Varela, Vilmos Csanyi, Gyorgy Kampis, David Loye, Jonathan Schull and Eric Chaisson of the initially secret General Evolutionary Research Group. Meeting behind the Iron Curtain, the group of scientists and thinkers from a variety of disciplines met in secret. Their goal was to explore whether it might be possible to use the chaos theory to identify a new general theory of evolution that might serve as a path to a better world.

=== Club of Budapest ===
In 1993, in response to his experience with the Club of Rome, he founded the Club of Budapest to, in his words, "centre attention on the evolution of human values and consciousness as the crucial factors in changing course — from a race towards degradation, polarization and disaster to a rethinking of values and priorities so as to navigate today's transformation in the direction of humanism, ethics and global sustainability".

=== Akashic field theory ===
László's 2004 book, Science and the Akashic Field: An Integral Theory of Everything posits a field of information as the substance of the cosmos. Using the Sanskrit and Vedic term for "space", Akasha, he calls this information field the "Akashic field" or "A-field". He posits that the "quantum vacuum" (see Vacuum state) is the fundamental energy and information-carrying field that informs not just the current universe, but all universes past and present (collectively, the Akashic records or "Metaverse").

He believed that such an informational field can explain why our universe appears to be fine-tuned so as to form galaxies and conscious lifeforms; and why evolution is an informed, not random, process. He believed that the hypothesis solves several problems that emerge from quantum physics, especially nonlocality and quantum entanglement.

=== The Immortal Mind ===
László became interested in the consciousness theories of Anthony Peake, (who in turn was an admirer of László’s work on the Akashic Field). Peake, whose background was in the social sciences, had sought to explain the fact that altered states of consciousness (such as déjà vu, dreams, psychedelic drug experiences, meditation, near death experience) sometimes seem to feature precognition and premonitions. Peake had produced a tentative synthesis of the ancient idea of the "Eternal Return" with modern ideas like the simulation argument, the holographic universe, and the many worlds interpretation. In Peake’s hypothesis, one lives variants of the same life repeatedly but with the ability to make different choices and experience different outcomes, and a premonition is in fact a memory of the past. Peake became a Consciousness Studies Department Member at Ervin László’s Center For Advanced Studies. László collaborated with Anthony Peake on the book The Immortal Mind: Science and the Continuity of Consciousness Beyond the Brain.

=== Macroshift theory ===
In his book You Can Change the World, László promotes a linking of non-government organizations promoting sustainable development, using the Internet.

=== Autobiography ===
László wrote an autobiography entitled Simply Genius! And Other Tales from My Life, published by Hay House Publishers in June 2011.

== Reception ==
In an essay, Stanislav Grof compared László's work to that of Ken Wilber, saying "Where Wilber outlined what an integral theory of everything should look like, Laszlo actually created one."

== Awards and honors ==
In 2002, László received an honorary doctorate from the University of Pécs.

== Selected publications ==
- Introduction to Systems Philosophy: Toward a New Paradigm of Contemporary Thought, Gordon and Breach, 1972; Harper Torchbooks, 1973.
- The Systems View of the World: A Holistic Vision for Our Time, Hampton Press, 1996.
- The Whispering Pond: A Personal Guide to the Emerging Vision of Science, Element Books, Ltd., 1996.
- Evolution: The General Theory, Hampton Press, 1996.
- Macroshift: Navigating the Transformation to a Sustainable World, Berrett - Koehler, 2001
- The Connectivity Hypothesis: Foundations of an Integral Science of Quantum, Cosmos, Life, and Consciousness, State University of New York Press, 2003.
- You Can Change the World: The Global Citizen's Handbook for Living on Planet Earth: A Report of the Club of Budapest, Select Books, 2003.
- Science and the Akashic Field: An Integral Theory of Everything, Inner Traditions International, 2004.
- Science and the Reenchantment of the Cosmos : The Rise of the Integral Vision of Reality, Inner Traditions, 2006.
- The Chaos Point: The World at the Crossroads, Hampton Roads, 2006.
- Quantum Shift in the Global Brain: How the New Scientific Reality Can Change Us and our World, Inner Traditions, 2008.
- WorldShift 2012: Making Green Business New Politics & Higher Consciousness Work Together, McArthur & Company, 2009.
- The Immortal Mind: Science and the Continuity of Consciousness Beyond the Brain, with Anthony Peake, Simon and Schuster, 2014.
- The Intelligence of the Cosmos, Inner Traditions, 2017.
- Reconnecting to the Source: The New Science of Spiritual Experience, How It Can Change You, and How It Can Transform the World, St. Martin's Essentials, 2020.
