= Adolph Lowe =

German sociologist and economist

Adolph Lowe (born Adolf Löwe; 4 March 1893 – 3 June 1995) was a German sociologist and economist. His best known student was Robert Heilbroner. He was born in Stuttgart and died in Wolfenbüttel.

== Major publications of Adolph Lowe ==
- Arbeitslosigkeit und Kriminalität, 1914.
- "Zur Methode der Kriegswirtschaftsgesetzgebung", 1915, Die Hilfe
- "Die freie Konkurrenz", 1915, Die Hilfe
- Wirtschaftliche Demobilisierung, 1916.
- "Mitteleuropäische Demobilisierung", 1917, Wirtschaftszeitung der Zentralmächte.
- "Die ausführende Gewalt in der Ernährungspolitik", 1917, Europäische Staats- und Wirtschaftszeitung
- "Die Massenpreisung im System der Volksernährung", 1917, Europäische Staats- und Wirtschaftszeitung
- "Die Fragen der Übergangswirtschaft", 1918, Die Woche
- "Die Arbeiter- und Soldatenräte in der Demobilmachung", 1919, Europäische Staats- und Wirtschaftszeitung
- "Die Neue Demokratie", 1919, Der Spiegel
- "Die Soziologie des modernen Judentums", 1920, Der Spiegel
- "Zur gegenwartige Stand der Konjukturforschung in Deutschland", 1925, in Bonn and Palyi, editors, Die Wirtschaftswissenshaft nach dem Kriege, 1925.
- "Chronik der Weltwirtschaft", 1925, WWA
- "Wie ist Konjunkturtheorie uberhaupt möglich?", 1926, WWA (transl. 1997, "How is Business Cycle Theory Possible at All?", Structural Change and Economic Dynamics)
- "Weitere Bemerkungen zur Konjunkturforschung", 1926, Wirtschaftdienst
- "Zur Möglichkeit der Konjukturtheorie: Antwort auf Frank Oppenheimer", 1927, WWA
- "Über den Einfluss monetärer Faktoren auf der Konjukturzyklus", 1928, in Diel, editor, Beiträge zur Wirstschaftstheorie
- "Kredit und Konjuktur", 1929, in Boese, editor, Wandlungen des Kapitalismus Auslandsanleihen
- "Reparationspolitik", 1930, Neue Blätter für den Sozialismus
- "Lohnabbau als Mittel der Krisenbekämpfung?", 1930, Neue Blätter für den Sozialismus
- "Der Sinn der Weltwirschaftskrise", 1931, Neue Blätter für den Sozialismus
- "Das gegenwartige Bildungsproblem der deutschen Universität", 1931, Die Erziehung
- "Über den Sinn und die Grenzen verstehender Nationalökonomie", 1932, WWA
- "Der Stand und die nächste Zukunft der Konjukturforschung in Deutschland", 1933, Festschrift fur Arthur Spiethoff
- "Some Theoretical Considerations of the Meaning of Trend", 1935, Proceedings Manchester Statistical Society
- Economics and Sociology: A plea for cooperation in the social sciences, 1935.
- "Economic Analysis and Social Structure", 1936, Manchester School.
- "The Social Productivity of Technical Improvements", 1937, Manchester School
- "The Task of Democratic Education: pre-Hitler Germany and England", 1937, Social Research
- The Price of Liberty: A German on contemporary Britain, 1937.
- "The Turn of the Boom", 1938, Manchester Statistical Society
- The Universities in Transformation, 1940.
- "A Reconsideration of the Law of Supply and Demand", 1942, Social Research.
- "The Trend in World Economics", 1944, American J of Econ and Sociology
- "On the Mechanistic Approach in Economics", 1951, Social Research.
- "A Structural Model of Production", 1952, Social Research
- "National Economic Planning", 1952, in Hanley, editor, Survey of Contemporary Economics
- "The Classical Theory of Economic Growth", 1954, Social Research.
- "Structural Analysis of Real Capital Formation", 1955, in Abramovitz, editor, Capital Formation and Economic Growth.
- "The Practical Uses of Theory: Comment", 1959, Social Research.
- "Wirtschaftstheorie - der nächtste Schritt", 1959, Hamburger Jahrbuch fur Wirtschafts und Gesellschaftspolitik
- On Economic Knowledge: Toward a science of political economics, 1965.
- "The Normative Roots of Economic Value",1967, in Hook, Human Values and Economic Policy.
- "Toward a Science of Political Economics", 1969, in Heilbroner, editor, Economic Means and Social Ends
- "Economic Means and Social Ends: A Rejoinder", 1969, in Heilbroner, editor, Economic Means and Social Ends
- "Toward a Science of Political Economics", 1970, in Phenomenology and Social Reality.
- "Adam Smith's System of Economic Growth", 1975, in Skinner and Wilson, editors, Essays on Adam Smith
- The Path of Economic Growth, 1976.
- "Prometheus Unbound: A new world in the making", 1978, in Spicker, editor, Organism, Medicine and Metaphysics
- "What is Evolutionary Economics? Remarks upon receipt of the Veblen-Commons Award", 1980, Journal of Economic Issues.
- "Is Economic Value Still a Problem?", 1981, Social Research
- "Is the Glass Half Full or Half Empty? A self-critique", 1982, Social Research.
- Has Freedom a Future?, 1988.

== Secondary sources ==
- Lissner, Will (January 1996). "In memoriam: Adolph Lowe, 1893-1995 - economist". The American Journal of Economics and Sociology. 55 (1). Archived from the original on June 21, 2006 – via FindArticles.
- Claus-Dieter Krohn: Der Philosophische Ökonom. Zur intellektuellen Biographie Adolph Lowes. 240 Seiten, Mai 1996 ISBN 3-89518-081-5
- Volker Caspari, Bertram Schefold: Franz Oppenheimer und Adolph Lowe. Zwei Wirtschaftswissenschaftler der Frankfurter Universität. 312 Seiten, 1996 ISBN 3-89518-088-2
- Claus-Dieter Krohn: Vertreibung und Akkulturation deutscher Wirtschaftswissenschaftler nach 1933 am Beispiel A.L.s und der 'University in Exile' an der New School for Social Research in New York in: Der Exodus aus Nazideutschland und die Folgen. Jüdische Wissenschaftler im Exil Hg. Marianne Hassler, Attempto, Tübingen 1997 ISBN 3-89308-265-4
