= Jennifer Wilby =

American business theorist

Jennifer M. Wilby (born 1953) is an American and UK management scientist, past director of the Centre for Systems Studies, and was a senior lecturer and researcher in management systems and sciences at The Business School, University of Hull. She served as president of the International Society for the Systems Sciences for the term 2010–2011.

== Biography ==
Jennifer Wilby received a BA in political science in 1978 from the University of California, Riverside, and an MSc in cybernetic systems from San José State University in 1992. In 1999 she also received a MPH in public health from the University of Leeds, and in 2007 a PhD in management systems at the University of Hull.

In 1978 Wilby started working in urban planning, followed by database programming and textbook publishing. From 1994 to 1997 she worked as a research assistant in the Centre for Systems Studies at the University of Hull and then from 1997 to 1999 at the University of Lincoln. From 1999 to 2004 she was a research fellow at the University of York in the Centre for Reviews and Dissemination, undertaking systematic reviews of health care interventions on behalf of the Department of Health (NICE). Since then, she has been a director of the Centre for Systems Studies and a senior lecturer and researcher in management systems and sciences at The Business School, University of Hull. From 2007 to 2009, she also held a part-time EPSRC post-doctoral fellowship researching the EmergeNet Emerging Sustainability Project.

Wilby has worked as vice president for administration and VP Research and Publications for the International Society for the Systems Sciences (ISSS), and past work has included honorary treasurer and executive board member of ARCISS (The Association of Research Centres in the Social Sciences), and a member of the board of the UKSS (United Kingdom Systems Society). In 1995, she received the Sir Geoffrey Vickers Memorial Award. In the year July 2010 to 2011, she served as president of the International Society for the Systems Sciences (ISSS) and hosted the ISSS conference in 2011 at the University of Hull, Hull, UK, and served on the board of the United Kingdom Systems Society (UKSS). In 2013, Wilby was inducted into the International Academy for Systems and Cybernetic Sciences (IASCYS).

She was also editor of Systema, the Bulletin of the International Society for the Systems Sciences and book reviews editor of Systemic Practice and Action Research.

== Awards ==
- 1995 - Sir Geoffrey Vickers Memorial Award for best student paper at the Amsterdam meeting of The International Society for the Systems Sciences.
- 2014 - McCulloch Award by the American Society for Cybernetics, for outstanding lifelong contributions to cybernetics.

== Work ==
Wilby's research interests is general systems theory and critical system theory and practice. This research includes a "systematic and critical review of systems methodologies; hierarchies in organisations; and the use of general system theory and critical systems theory in informing the development of international health policies that reflect both hard (technical) and soft (social) elements in a problem situation".

== Publications ==
Jennifer Wilby has published several books, papers and articles. A selection:

- 1995. Systems Methodology: Possibilities for Cross-cultural Learning and Integration : Proceedings of a Conference Held at the Institute of Systems Science, Beijing, China, May 23–25, 1995. University of Hull, Centre for Systems Studies, 1995. ISBN 0-85958-846-7
- 1996. The Second UK-China-Japan Workshop on Systems Methodology: Possibilities for Cross-cultural Learning and Integration; Proceedings of a Workshop Held at Konan University, Kyoto, Japan. Centre for Systems Studies. University of Hull, 1996. ISBN 0-85958-875-0
- 1997. Forum Three: Human Consciousness and Decision Making : Contributions to a Discussion Organised by the Centre for Systems Studies, University of Hull, June 16–18, 1997. With Wendy Gregory. Centre for Systems Studies, University of Hull, 1997. ISBN 0-85958-956-0
- 2001. Understanding complexity : a commemorative volume of the World Congress of the Systems Sciences and ISSS 2000, Toronto, Canada. Edited with Gillian Ragsdell. Kluwer Academic / Plenum Publishers. ISBN 0-306-46586-8
- 2002. Systems theory and practice in the knowledge age. Edited with Gillian Ragsdell and Daune West. Kluwer Academic/Plenum Publishers. ISBN 0-306-47247-3
- 2006. Proceedings of the 50th Annual Conference of ISSS Complexity, Democracy and Sustainability, July 9–14, 2006, Sonoma State University, Rohnert Park, California. The International Society for the Systems Sciences, 2006. ISBN 0-9740735-7-1
