= Systems Research and Behavioral Science =

- Discipline: Systems sciences
- Language: English
- Edited by: A. J. Gregory

Publication details
- History: 1997-present
- Publisher: John Wiley & Sons
- Impact factor: 2.700 (2022)

Standard abbreviations
- ISO 4: Syst. Res. Behav. Sci.

Indexing
- ISSN: 1099-1743

Links
- Journal homepage; Online access; Online archive

Systems Research and Behavioral Science is a peer-reviewed scientific journal for theory and research in the fields of systems sciences and cybernetics. It is the official publication of the International Federation for Systems Research.

== History ==
The journal originated from the merger of two journals, Systems Research (1974–1996) and Behavioral Science (1956–1996). The combined series commenced in January/February 1997 with volume 14, continuing the numbering of Systems Research. According to the Journal Citation Reports, the journal has a 2022 impact factor of 2.700.

== See also ==
- List of journals in systems science
