= Saybrook University =

Private university in Pasadena, California

- Former names: Humanistic Psychology Institute, Saybrook Graduate School and Research Center
- Type: Private university
- Established: 1971
- Parent institution: The Community Solution Education System
- Accreditation: WSCUC
- President: Jeremy Moreland
- Academic staff: 156
- Students: 622 (Fall 2016)
- Location: Pasadena, California, U.S.
- Campus: Urban
- Website: saybrook.edu

Saybrook University is a private university in Pasadena, California, United States. It was founded in 1971 by Eleanor Camp Criswell and others. It offers postgraduate education with a focus on humanistic psychology. It features low residency, master's, and doctoral degrees and professional certification programs. The university is accredited by the WASC Senior Colleges and University Commission. The university is classified an exclusively graduate institution with programs that are "Research Doctoral: Humanities/social sciences-dominant". As of Fall of 2017 the university had 785 students enrolled. The university reported 222 full-time and part-time academic faculty in 2017.

== History ==
Eleanor Camp Criswell, along with Rollo May, Clark Moustakas, and James Bugental, founded the Humanistic Psychology Institute at California State University, Sonoma in 1971. Author Michael Mayer recalls that the Saybrook name derives from Old Saybrook, Connecticut, where during a conference in 1964 several psychologists, including Rollo May and Carl Rogers, expressed a desire "to create a school that embodied the values of the 'human growth and potential movement' and to educate practitioner-scholars in the methods and philosophies of human-centered psychotherapy".

Under the leadership of Criswell and philosopher Thomas Louis Hanna, the school began offering graduate courses in humanistic psychology. In the 1970s, the school moved to the Burr Mansion in Cow Hollow, San Francisco. Later on it was renamed the Saybrook Graduate School and Research Center.

In 2009, the school was renamed Saybrook University. In 2014, Saybrook became affiliated with The Community Solution Education System, a shared-services university system created by The Chicago School, to provide administrative and financial services so that Saybrook could focus on teaching and research. The same year, the administrative offices of the school moved from San Francisco to Oakland, California. The administrative offices now are located in Pasadena, California.

== Academics ==
It offers programs in Psychology and Interdisciplinary Studies (non-clinical), Clinical Psychology, Psychophysiology, Mind-Body Medicine, Leadership and Management, Counseling, Integrative Wellness Coaching, Transformative Social Change, and Integrative and Functional Nutrition.

The school's president is Jeremy Moreland.

=== Colleges ===
The university awards Master of Arts, Master of Science, and Doctor of Philosophy degrees as well as certificates. These programs are housed in colleges and schools:

- College of Social Sciences
  - Department of Humanistic and Clinical Psychology
  - Department of Counseling
  - Department of Leadership and Management
  - Department of Transformative Social Change
  - Department of Business Administration
- College of Integrative Medicine and Health Sciences
  - Department of Integrative Wellness Coaching
  - Department of Integrative and Functional Nutrition
  - Department of Applied Psychophysiology
  - Department of Mind-Body Medicine

=== Rankings ===
Based on a survey of academic programs, U.S. News & World Report ranked Saybrook's psychology program in the bottom quartile of its 2013 ranking of graduate psychology programs. The precise rankings in this quartile are not published. The United States National Research Council rankings (NRC) ranked Saybrook in a tied tier between 173 and 174 out of 185 in its 2014 rankings of 185 psychology PhD programs.

== Accreditation ==
Saybrook University is accredited by the WASC Senior College and University Commission (WSCUC). Saybrook's M.A. in counseling is accredited by The Council for Accreditation of Counseling and Related Educational Programs (CACREP), however the remainder of its clinical mental health programs are not accredited by any major national accrediting body or major professional organizations' accrediting bodies like the American Psychological Association (APA) (which does not accredit distance-learning programs). This can cause problems with licensure or employment in certain agencies.

== Student demographics ==
Fall 2020 enrollment - Race/ethnicity
Program	Total Students	International	Latino/Hispanic	American Indian/Alaska Native	Asian	Black/African American	White	Two or More Races	Not Reported
Certificates	6	0%	0%	0%	16.7%	0%	83.3%	0%	0%
Master's	143	0%	11.3%	2.5%	1.8%	15.6%	58.8%	3.8%	6.9%
Doctoral	524	1.6%	12%	0.6%	4.5%	17.1%	48.3%	7.1%	8.2%
Total	785	1.3%	11.7%	0.8%	4.2%	16.7%	50.7%	6.4%	7.2%

Fall 2020 Enrollment - Gender
Program	Male	Female	Non Binary
Certificates	2	4	0
Master's	25	134	1
Doctoral	122	496	1
Total	149 (19%)	634 (80.8%)	2 (.3%)

== Notable faculty ==
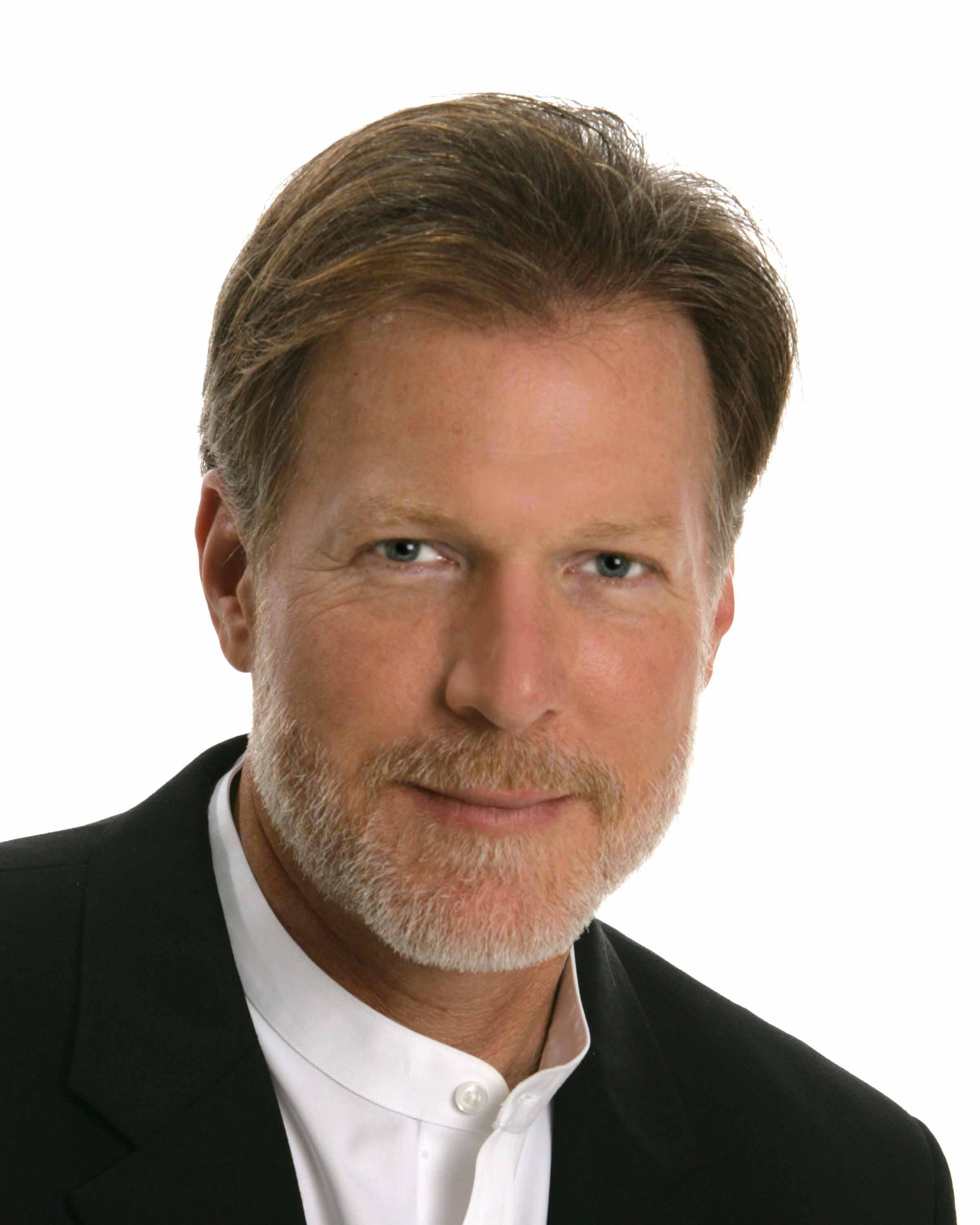
Gary S. Metcalf

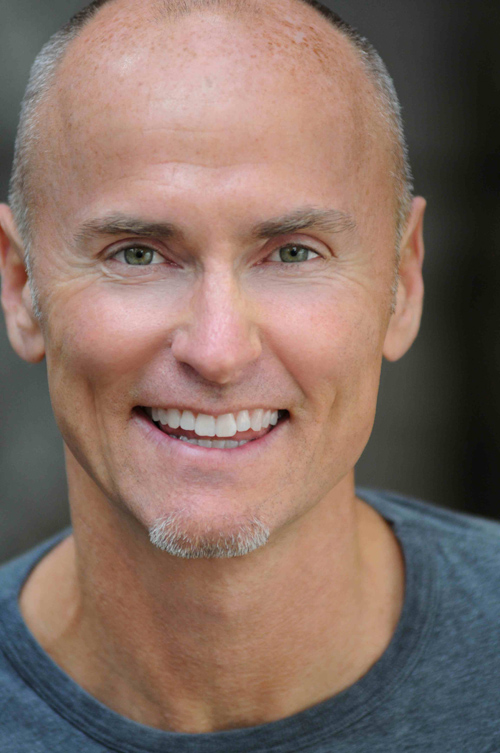
Chip Conley

Notable faculty include Gary S. Metcalf at the School of Organizational Leadership and Transformation and author Chip Conley.
