= Systems science =

Study of the nature of systems

Impression of systems thinking about society

Systems science, also referred to as systems research or simply systems, is a transdisciplinary field that is concerned with understanding simple and complex systems in nature and society, which leads to the advancements of formal, natural, social, and applied attributions throughout engineering, technology, and science itself.

To systems scientists, the world can be understood as a system of systems. The field aims to develop transdisciplinary foundations that are applicable in a variety of areas, such as psychology, biology, medicine, communication, business, technology, computer science, engineering, and social sciences.

Themes commonly stressed in system science are (a) holistic view, (b) interaction between a system and its embedding environment, and (c) complex (often subtle) trajectories of dynamic behavior that sometimes are stable (and thus reinforcing), while at various 'boundary conditions' can become wildly unstable (and thus destructive). Concerns about Earth-scale biosphere/geosphere dynamics is an example of the nature of problems to which systems science seeks to contribute meaningful insights.

== Associated fields ==
The systems sciences are a broad array of fields. One way of conceiving of these is in three groups: fields that have developed systems ideas primarily through theory; those that have done so primarily through practical engagements with problem situations; and those that have applied ideas for other disciplines.

=== Theoretical fields ===
==== Control theory ====
- Affect control theory
- Control engineering
- Control systems

==== Cybernetics ====
- Autopoiesis
- Conversation theory
- Engineering cybernetics
- Perceptual control theory
- Management cybernetics
- Second-order cybernetics
- Cyber-physical system
- Artificial intelligence
- Synthetic intelligence

==== General systems theory ====
- Systems theory in anthropology
- Biochemical systems theory
- Ecological systems theory
- Developmental systems theory
- General systems theory
- Living systems theory
- LTI system theory
- Social systems
- Sociotechnical systems theory
- Mathematical system theory
- World-systems theory

=== Practical fields ===
==== Soft systems methodology ====
The soft systems methodology was developed in England by academics at the University of Lancaster Systems Department through a ten-year action research programme. The main contributor is Peter Checkland (born 18 December 1930, in Birmingham, UK), a British management scientist and emeritus professor of systems at Lancaster University.

==== Systems analysis ====
Systems analysis branch of systems science that analyzes systems, the interactions within those systems, or interaction with its environment, often prior to their automation as computer models. Systems analysis is closely associated with the RAND corporation.

==== Systemic design ====
Systemic design integrates methodologies from systems thinking with advanced design practices to address complex, multi-stakeholder situations.

==== Systems dynamics ====
System dynamics is an approach to understanding the behavior of complex systems over time. It offers "simulation technique for modeling business and social systems", which deals with internal feedback loops and time delays that affect the behavior of the entire system. What makes using system dynamics different from other approaches to studying complex systems is the use of feedback loops and stocks and flows.

==== Systems engineering ====
Systems engineering (SE) is an interdisciplinary field of engineering, that focuses on the development and organization of complex systems. It is the "art and science of creating whole solutions to complex problems", for example: signal processing systems, control systems and communication system, or other forms of high-level modelling and design in specific fields of engineering. Systems Science is foundational to the Embedded Software Development that is founded in the embedded requirements of Systems Engineering.

- Aerospace systems
- Biological systems engineering
- Earth systems engineering and management
- Electronic systems
- Enterprise systems engineering
- Software systems
- Systems analysis

=== Applications in other disciplines ===
==== Earth system science ====
- Climate systems
- Systems geology

==== Systems biology ====
- Computational systems biology
- Synthetic biology
- Systems immunology
- Systems neuroscience

==== Systems ecology ====
- Ecosystem ecology
- Agroecology

==== Systems psychology ====
- Ergonomics
- Family systems theory
- Systemic therapy

== See also ==
- Antireductionism
- Evolutionary prototyping
- Holism
- Cybernetics
- System engineering
- System Dynamics
- Systemics
- System equivalence
- Systems theory
- Tektology
- World-systems theory
- Complex Systems
