= List of systems sciences organizations =

Impression of systems thinking about society

Systems science is the interdisciplinary field of science surrounding systems theory, cybernetics, the science of complex systems. It aims to develop interdisciplinary foundations, which are applicable in a variety of areas, such as engineering, biology, medicine and social sciences. Systems science and systemics are names for all research related to systems theory. It is defined as an emerging branch of science that studies holistic systems and tries to develop logical, mathematical, engineering and philosophical paradigms and frameworks in which physical, technological, biological, social, cognitive and metaphysical systems can be studied and developed.

This list of systems sciences organizations gives an overview of global and local organizations in the field of systems science. This list shows all kinds of organizations and institutes listed thematically.

== Awards ==
- Richard E. Bellman Control Heritage Award
- George B. Dantzig Prize
- Donald P. Eckman Award
- IEEE Simon Ramo Medal: award for exceptional achievement in systems engineering and systems science
- John von Neumann Theory Prize
- Rufus Oldenburger Medal
- A. M. Turing Award
- UKSS Gold Medallists by the United Kingdom Systems Society
- The Hellenic Society for Systemic Studies Medal
- Senior Researcher Award of the Complex Systems Society

== Research centers ==
=== General ===
==== America ====
- International Institute for General Systems Studies (IIGSS): an American non-profit scholastic organization for studies and education in Systems science in Pennsylvania, US
- International Systems Institute (ISI): a non-profit, public benefit scientific and educational corporation in Carmel, California, US
- Mental Research Institute: a center for systems theory and psychotherapy located in Palo Alto, California, US

==== Europe ====
- Institut für Unternehmenskybernetik, Germany

==== Asia ====
- Center of Excellence in Systems Science, IIT Jodhpur

=== Systems biology ===
- Department of Systems Biology
- Institute for Systems Biology
- Max Planck Institute for Biological Cybernetics

=== Systems ecology ===
- ETH Zurich, Terrestrial Systems Ecology
- University of Amsterdam, Systems Ecology Department
- University of Florida, Systems Ecology program
- State University of New York College of Environmental Science and Forestry, Systems Ecology Lab
- Stockholm University, Systems Ecology Department

=== Systems engineering ===
==== United States ====
- GTRI Electronic Systems Laboratory (ELSYS) at the Georgia Tech Research Institute, Atlanta, Georgia, US
- GTRI Aerospace, Transportation and Advanced Systems Laboratory at the Georgia Tech Research Institute, Atlanta, Georgia, US
- Western Transportation Institute at Montana State University, Montana, US

==== Europe ====
- Hasso Plattner Institute related to the University of Potsdam, Germany
- University of Reading Business School: Informatics Research Centre, Reading, Berkshire, England, UK
- École Polytechnique Fédérale de Lausanne: I2S – Institut d'ingénierie des systèmes in Lausanne, Switzerland
- University of the West of England CEMS, Systems Engineering Estimation and Decision Support (SEED) Bristol, England, UK
- University of Bristol, Systems Centre, Bristol, England, UK
- Technical University of Hamburg, Hamburg, Germany
- Mullard Space Science Laboratory: UCL Centre for Systems Engineering (UCLse), the London, England, UK
- Research Centre for Automatic Control (CRAN), joint research unit with Nancy-Université and CNRS, Nancy, France

== Educational ==
=== Europe ===
- Bristol Centre for Complexity Sciences, UK
- Institute for Complex Systems Simulation, University of Southampton, UK

=== Australia ===
- The University of Sydney offers a Master of Complex Systems

== Societies ==
=== Worldwide ===
- IEEE Systems, Man, and Cybernetics Society (IEEE SMCS)
- International Council on Systems Engineering (INCOSE)
- International Federation for Systems Research (IFSR)
- International Society for the Systems Sciences (ISSS)
- World Organisation of Systems and Cybernetics (WOSC)
- IEEE Systems Council
- Complex Systems Society (CSS)
- The International Academy for Systems and Cybernetic Sciences, an honor society initially created by the IFSR

=== America ===
- American Society for Cybernetics
- Asociacion Mexicana de Systemas y Cibernetica
- Grupo de Estudio de Sistemas Integrados (GESI) (Study Group of Integrated Systems), Argentina
- Instituto Andino de Sistemas (IAS), Peru
- International Systems Institute (US), California, San Francisco
- Los Alamos National Laboratory
- System Dynamics Society: a non-profit organization for further research into system dynamics and systems thinking based in Albany, New York, US

=== Asia ===
- International Society of Knowledge and Systems Science (ISKSS), Japan
- Japan Association for Social and Economic Systems Studies (JASESS)
- Korean Society for Systems Science Research, Korea
- Systems Engineering Society of China

=== Australia ===
- Australia and New Zealand Systems Group (ANZSYS)
- COSNet: An Australian-based network for Complex Open Systems research

=== Europe ===
- Association Francaise d'Ingénierie Système (French association for Systems Engineering), France
- Associazione Italiana per la Ricerca (AIR) (Italian Research Society)
- Associazione Italiana per la Ricerca sui Sistemi (AIRS) (Italian Systems Research Society)
- Bulgarian Society for Systems Research (BSSR), Bulgaria
- Centre for Hyperincursion and Anticipation in Ordered Systems (CHAOS)
- Croatian Interdisciplinary Society: a non-governmental organization for interdisciplinary education and research in complex systems in Croatia
- Cybernetics Society, London, UK
- Dutch Systems Group of Systemsgroep Nederland, The Netherlands
- Evolution, Complexity and Cognition group, subsumed within Center Leo Apostel (CLEA), VUB Free University of Brussels, Belgium
- Hellenic Society for Systemic Studies (HSSS) Ελληνική Εταρεία Συστημικών Μελετών
- Gesellschaft für Wirtschafts- und Sozialkybernetik e.V. (GWS), Germany
- Learned Society of Praxiology, Poland
- MSSI - Management Science Society of Ireland
- Österreichische Studiengesellschaft für Kybernetik (OSGK)(Austrian Society for Cybernetic Studies), Austria
- Polish Systems Society, Poland
- Slovenian Society for Systems Research (SDSR)
- Systemic Design Association (SDA): a non-profit scholarly association for research and practice in design for complex systems, based in Norway with international membership
- Sociedad Española de Systemas Generales, Spain
- United Kingdom Systems Society, UK

== See also ==
- List of journals in systems science
  - List of information systems journals
- List of systems engineering at universities
- List of systems engineers
- List of systems scientists
