= Peter Checkland =

British management scientist and systems theorist (1930–2026)

Peter Checkland (18 December 1930 – 17 May 2026) was a British management scientist and academic who was an emeritus professor of systems at Lancaster University. He was the developer of soft systems methodology (SSM): a methodology based on a way of systems thinking systems practice. Systems practice is the idea of uncovering an optimal solution within complex environments, thus leading to a thorough understanding of the system, analysing and adapting to change in the environment. In an important way his work preceded data science and change management disciplines in the next century.

== Life and career ==
Checkland was born in Birmingham on 18 December 1930. He attended George Dixon's Grammar School, and in 1954 received a M.A. degree in chemistry at St John's College, Oxford, where he graduated with 1st class honours.

He worked in the industry for 15 years as a manager in ICI's chemicals business. At the end of the 1960s he joined the pioneering department of Systems Engineering at Lancaster University, where he became professor of Systems. At Lancaster he led a programme of action research. This research team developed a new way of tackling problem situations faced by managers – Soft Systems Methodology. The SSM approach is now used and taught worldwide. Since the 1990s he was Professor Emeritus of Systems in Lancaster University Management School.

Checkland worked on the editorial board of journals such as European Journal of Information Systems; the International Journal of Information Management; the International Journal of General Systems; the Systems Practice; and the Systems Research journal.

In 1986, Checkland was president of the Society for General Systems Research, now International Society for the Systems Sciences. In May 1996 he was awarded an honorary degree from the Open University as Doctor of the University. In 2004 he was awarded an honorary doctorate by the University of Economics, Prague. In 2007 he was awarded the Beale Medal by the OR Society, in recognition of his sustained and significant contribution to the philosophy, theory and practice of operational research. In 2008 he received the INCOSE Pioneer Award.

Checkland died on 17 May 2026, aged 95.

== See also ==
- Brian Wilson
- Rich picture

== Publications ==
Checkland wrote four books on Soft Systems Methodology and several articles and papers:

- 1981, Systems Thinking, Systems Practice, Wiley [rev 1999 ed] ISBN 978-0-471-98606-5
- 1990, Soft Systems in Action, Wiley (with Jim Scholes) [rev 1999 ed] ISBN 978-0-471-98605-8
- 1998, Information, Systems and Information Systems, Wiley (with Sue Holwell) ISBN 978-0-471-95820-8
- 2006, Learning For Action: A Short Definitive Account of Soft Systems Methodology, and its use Practitioners, Teachers and Students, Wiley (with John Poulter) ISBN 978-0-470-02554-3
