= Luc Hoebeke =

Luc Hoebeke (27 December 1941 - 26 September 2026) was a Belgian consultant, author and lecturer in the field of self-organization, innovation processes and human activity systems, known for his book Making Work Systems Better: A Practitioner's Reflections (1994).

== Life and work ==
Born in Kortrijk, Belgium, Hoebeke received his Master of Science in Engineering in Electrical Engineering, Nuclear Physics and Management Science.

He has been working as consultant, author and lecturer. He assisted the University of Amsterdam in the development of a curriculum for the new study of Information Management and new Media, and also assisted the University of Leiden similar developments. He has been lecturer at the Sioo, Dutch institute for management studies, and from 2002 to 2010 he has been lecturer at the University of Cape Town Graduate School of Business.

Hoebeke has been active in the Metaphorum community and fora on the viable system model (VSM).

Hoebeke died on 26 September 2026, aged 84.

== Work ==
In his book Making Work Systems Better: A Practitioner's Reflections (1994) he developed a work system model based on the insights of Peter Checkland and Brian Wilson in soft systems methodology, Humberto Maturana and Francisco Varela's development of autopoiesis theory, and Stafford Beer's development of the viable system model.

The notion of a work system is defined by Hoebeke as "... a purposeful definition of the real world in which people spend effort in more or less coherent activities for mutually influencing each other and their environment."

In the work systems model Hoebeke describes the generic transformation processes, control information, audit information and development information for human activities using four overlapping time domains:

1. Added-value domain: This domain spans periods between 1 day and 2 years in which processes are characterized by throughput time, volume requirements, quality requirements and price requirements.
2. Innovation domain: This domain spans periods between 1 and 10 years in which processes are characterized by desirability, feasibility, transferability and systemicity.
3. Value-systems domain: This domain spans periods between 5 and 20 years in which processes are generative, tolerant, dialectical and congruent.
4. Spiritual domain: This domain spans periods longer than 20 years, up to 50 years. The generic transformation process in this domain is: "To materialize through works of art or mere behaviour the universal understanding of one's own mortality".

The notion of a transformation process is central in Hoebeke's work. Hoebeke defined it as "... a basic purpose behind the work system and transforms a specified input into a specified output. The output must contain the input, which has been transformed during the process."

The mentioned time domains (added-value, innovation, value-systems and spiritual) are overlapping. To handle this overlap Hoebeke uses the concept of process levels, of which there are seven to span the time between 1 day and 50 years. Process level is defined as:

A process of a higher order is one whose output creates conditions for one of a lower order. Processes can be differentiated in a hierarchy. To avoid confusion with what is seen in organisational terms as hierarchical levels we call this the process level.

Hoebeke also defined the following concepts in terms not found in contemporary management literature:

- Contributions of people
- Responsibility and accountability
- Clients, actors, owners (as stakeholders of the process)
- Environmental constraints and Weltanschauung
- The management process

To complete the models' dimensions Hoebeke defined three information processes:

- Strategic: All information processes that contribute to management, we call strategic information processes. These create, convey and develop meaning to all people involved in a work system.
- Control: Control information processes are those which lead to a corrective, regulative action by the people contributing to transformation processes.
- Audit: Audit information processes are those that lead actors to a more profound understanding of why the process is carried out, what it does, with what means it is performed and how these means are used.

== Selected publications ==
=== Books ===
- 1994, Making Work Systems Better: A Practitioner's Reflections, John Wiley & Sons, Diss. Internet edition 2000.

=== Articles, a selection ===
- Hoebeke, Luc. "From work ethics towards work esthetics: Work as art and technological choice." Human Systems Management 7.4 (1988): 333–340.
- Hoebeke, Luc. "Measuring in organisations." Journal of applied systems analysis 17 (1990): 115–122.
- Hoebeke, Luc. "Identity: the paradoxical nature of organizational closure." Kybernetes 35.1/2 (2006): 65–75.
- Hoebeke, Luc. "Dilemmas and paradoxes in organizing change processes." Dynamics of organizational change and learning (2004): 149–172.
