= Kyoichi Kijima =

Japanese systems scientist (born 1951)

Kyoichi Jim Kijima (木嶋 恭一, born 1951) is a Japanese systems scientist and professor of Decision Systems Science at the Tokyo Institute of Technology.

== Biography ==
Jim Kijima received an M.A. from Tokyo Institute of Technology in 1976 and a PhD in 1980. Later, in 1988, he spent a year in England to familiarize himself with soft systems engineering. In 1997 he spent another four months in England in collaboration with members of the United Kingdom Systems Society (UKSS) to further familiarize himself with the soft systems approach.

In 1980 Jim Kijima started working as an assistant professor in the Department of Industrial Engineering and Management at the Tokyo Institute of Technology. After he returned from England in 1988 he was appointed associate professor of Management Systems in the same department. In 1996 he became professor of Decision Systems Sciences in a new "Department of Value and Decision Science" and in the "Graduate School of Decision Science and Technology". Since 2006 he has been a visiting professor at the Hull University Business School.

He is a member of the UK Society for Systems Sciences and the International Society for the Systems Sciences, where he served as president of the society in 2007. He is also vice president of International Society for Knowledge and Systems Sciences. He further has served as a member of the international editorial board of Systems Research and Behavioral Science, the official journal of the International Federation of Systems Research. He was the editor-in-chief of Journal of Japan Society for Management Information in 2003–04.

== Work ==
Kijima's research interests are in systems-science-based approach to decision making and information. In particular, recently, he proposed a new paradigm called "poly-agent systems". It tries to deal with complexity involved in decision situations consisting of plural and autonomous decision makers. He is interested in integrating what we call hard and soft systems approaches to decision-making and management, by advocating Decision Systems Sciences. In 2006 he received a major grant from the government on agent-based modelling and systems research.

== Publications ==
Kijima has written some books and has published more than fifty refereed papers in high-quality international journals.

=== Books ===
- 1996. Encyclopedia of Operations Research and Management Science. Kluwer Academic Publications.
- 2003. Applied General Systems Research on Organizations. With Shingo Takahashi and Ryo Sato. Springer Verlag.
- 2007. Agent-based Approaches in Economic and Social Complex Systems. With T. Terano, Hajime Kita and Hiroshi Deguchi. Post Proceedings of the AESCS International Workshop 2005, No. 4. Springer Series on Agent Based Social Systems.

Articles, a selection:

- 1993. "Develop or Copy Decision of New Information Technology".
- 1995. "SOFT Science and Technology: Its Aims, Scope and Implementation".
- 1997. "Internet-Based Entrepreneurial Networking To Evolve The Japanese Industrial", with Hikari Akizawa.
- 1997. "Truth-telling Problems in Virtual Society: Higher Order Hypergame".
- 2000. "Why Does IT-based Entrepreneurs Society Emerge Hierarchy of the Networks?".
- 2001. "Enterprise Science for Technology-intensive Company and its Elaboration by Systems Thinking". With Hugo Tschirky.
- 2003. "Agent-based Simulation of Alliance Formation and its Stability Analysis: Application to Aviation Industry".
- 2004. "Beyond Needs Analysis: Soft Systems Methodology for Meaningful Collaboration in EAP Course Design". In: Journal of English for Academic Purpose, Vol 4, no 1, pp. 27-42.
- 2004. "Project Management Methodology for Stimulating Strategic Communication in Japan: Soft Systems Approach for Knowledge Creation", in: Systems Research and Behavioral Science, Vol 21 pp. 1-13.
- 2005. "Contingent Framework for Supporting Participatory Decision Making". In: International Journal of Knowledge and Systems Sciences. Vol 1, pp. 19-24.
- 2006. "Misrepresentation-proof Strategies". In: European Journal of Operational Research. Vol 172, pp. 574-587.
- 2006. "Soft Systems Approach to Project-based Education and its Practice in a Japanese University". In: Systems Research and Behavioral Science. Vol 23, pp. 89-105.
- 2007. "Systems of system failures: Meta system methodology to prevent system failures". With Takafumi Nakamura, Paper ISSS SIG on Systems Applications in Business and Industry at Tokyo 2007.
