= Systemic design =

Interdisciplinary design field concerned with systems

Systemic design is an interdiscipline that integrates systems thinking and design practices to address complex, multi-stakeholder problems. The field distinguishes itself through its focus on understanding and intervening in entire systems rather than isolated components, and its attention to relationships, patterns, and emergent behaviors within complex social, ecological, and technical contexts.

Systemic design is a pluralistic field with multiple approaches and methodologies, including systems-oriented design, institutional approaches focused on sustainability and circular economy, and frameworks for addressing climate and social challenges. Theoretical influences include critical systems thinking, second-order cybernetics, and soft systems methodology. The field has been applied to domains including healthcare, urban planning, public policy, education, and sustainability.

== History and development ==
=== Origins in design methods movement ===
Systems thinking in design has historical roots in the design methods movement of the 1960s and 1970s. Horst Rittel's concept of "wicked problems" and Christopher Alexander's pattern language represented early attempts to address systemic complexity in design. Buckminster Fuller's comprehensive anticipatory design science proposed design as a systemic discipline for addressing global challenges.

The Ulm School of Design and the broader design methods movement explored connections between systems theory and design practice, though these early attempts often emphasized rationalistic approaches that were later critiqued by designers.

=== Contemporary emergence ===
The contemporary articulation of systemic design as a distinct interdiscipline emerged in the 2010s, drawing on renewed interest in complexity theory, sustainability, and participatory design practices. Multiple academic institutions and research groups began developing systemic design programs and methodologies, often independently but with shared concerns about addressing complex adaptive systems and social complexity.

In 2013, the term "systemic design" was proposed to distinguish the broader field from specific methodological approaches like systems-oriented design, allowing for pluralistic development of the interdiscipline. The Design Council (UK) incorporated systemic design into their revised Double Diamond framework in 2021, signaling broader institutional recognition.

== Theoretical foundations ==
=== Systems thinking integration ===
Systemic design integrates concepts from multiple traditions of systems thinking. From soft systems methodology, it adopts attention to multiple stakeholder perspectives and acknowledgment of conflicting worldviews. Critical systems thinking provides frameworks for boundary critique and methodological pluralism. From second-order cybernetics, systemic design incorporates recognition of the observer's role in system definition and the recursive nature of design interventions.

=== Complexity theory ===
Systemic design addresses complex adaptive systems, acknowledging that many contemporary design challenges involve emergence, nonlinearity, and feedback loops. Drawing on complexity theory, systemic designers recognize that interventions in complex systems can have unintended consequences and that system behavior emerges from relationships between components rather than from components in isolation.

=== Design theory ===
Systemic design maintains distinctly design-oriented characteristics including abductive reasoning, prototyping, visualization, and iterative development. This distinguishes it from systems engineering and other rationalistic approaches to system design, emphasizing creativity, human experience, and the situated nature of design practice.

== Approaches and methodologies ==
=== Systems-oriented design ===
Systems-oriented design (SOD), developed by Birger Sevaldson at the Oslo School of Architecture and Design, emphasizes designerly approaches to systems thinking. Key methods include gigamapping (large-scale visual systems mapping), rich design space exploration, and integration of qualitative and quantitative research methods.

=== Sustainability-focused approaches ===
The Politecnico di Torino developed systemic design methodologies focused on environmental sustainability and circular economy, analyzing material flows, energy systems, and territorial relationships. This approach emphasizes industrial ecology, waste as resource, and regenerative design principles.

=== Other approaches ===
Additional variations include frameworks focused on service design, public policy, organizational change, and transition design.

== Methods and practices ==
Systemic design employs diverse methods adapted from both systems thinking and design practice:

Systems analysis and mapping:

- Causal loop diagrams
- Stakeholder mapping
- Gigamapping and rich pictures
- System dynamics modeling
- Network analysis

Designerly methods:

- Prototyping at system level
- Scenario planning
- Co-design and participatory workshops
- Design fiction and speculative design
- Service blueprinting

Hybrid approaches:

- Systems-oriented visualization practices
- Synthesis mapping
- Transition pathways design
- System intervention design

== Applications ==
Systemic design has been applied across multiple domains:

Healthcare: Redesigning patient pathways, addressing public health challenges, improving care coordination

Urban planning: Addressing mobility, housing, and urban metabolism

Sustainability: Circular economy implementation, sustainable food systems, industrial symbiosis

Public policy: Participatory budgeting, policy innovation, democratic processes

Organizational change: Business model innovation, organizational restructuring, strategic planning

== Academic programs and research groups ==
Multiple universities worldwide offer programs and courses in systemic design or related approaches:

- Politecnico di Torino: Master of Science in Systemic Design
- Oslo School of Architecture and Design: Systems Oriented Design programs
- OCAD University: Strategic Foresight and Innovation (incorporates systemic design)
- Georgetown University: Communication, Culture & Technology
- National Institute of Design (India): Systems Thinking and Design
- Université de Montréal: Design and Complexity

Research groups and centers include the Systemic Design Lab (Politecnico di Torino), Systemic Design and Sustainability Research Group (Oslo Metropolitan University), Strategic Innovation Lab (OCAD University), the Radical Methodologies Research Group at the University of Brighton, Systems Engineering Design research group at Chalmers University of Technology, Gothenburg, Sweden and others.

Academic discourse is supported by scholarly organizations including the Systemic Design Association, which organizes the annual Relating Systems Thinking and Design symposium and publishes the journal Contexts—The Systemic Design Journal.

== Publications ==
Since 2014 several scholarly journals have acknowledged systemic design with special publications, and in 2022, the Systemic Design Association launched "Contexts—The Journal of Systemic Design." The proceedings repository, Relating Systems Thinking and Design, exceeded 1000 articles in 2023.

Special Publications
| Date | Publication | Title | Editors |
|---|---|---|---|
| 2014 | FORMakademisk | Relating Systems Thinking and Design I (Practice Issue) | Birger Sevaldson, Alex J. Ryan |
| 2014 | FORMakademisk | Relating Systems Thinking and Design II (Theory Issue) | Peter Jones |
| 2017 | FORMakademisk | Relating Systems Thinking and Design III | Jodi Forlizzi, Birger Sevaldson, Alex Ryan |
| 2018 | FORMakademisk | Relating Systems Thinking and Design IV | Birger Sevaldson |
| 2018 | SHE JI Journal of Design, Economics, and Innovation | The Systemic Turn: Leverage for World Changing Vol 3, Issue 3 | Peter Jones |
| 2019 | FORMakademisk | Relating Systems Thinking and Design V | Michael Ulrich Hensel, Defne Sunguroğlu Hensel, Birger Sevaldson |
| 2019 | SHE JI Journal of Design, Economics, and InnovationSHE JI Journal of Design, Economics, and Innovation | Pathways to Systemic Design, Vol 5, Issue 2 | Birger Sevaldson, Peter Jones |
| 2020 | FORMakademisk | Relating Systems Thinking and Design VI | Marie Davidova, Ben Sweeting, Birger Sevaldson |
| 2020 | Strategic Design Research Journal | Special Issue: Relating Systems Thinking and Design. Systemic Design and Co-creation Processes for Territorial Enhancement | Silvia Barbero, Amina Pereno |
| 2021 | Touchpoint | Special Issue: Service Design and Systems Thinking | J. Tuomas Harviainen, Josina Vink |
| 2022 | Policy Design and Practice | Volume 5, Issue 1 | Kidjie Saguin, Benjamin Cashore |

=== Relating Systems Thinking and Design (RSD) ===
Since 2012, host organisations have held an annual symposium dedicated to systemic design, Relating Systems Thinking and Design (RSD). Proceedings are available via the searchable repository on RSDsymposium.org.

RSD Symposia
| Year | Hosts | Theme |
|---|---|---|
| RSD13-2024 | Oslo School of Architecture and Design | Rivers of Conversations |
| RSD12-2023 | Georgetown University | Entangled in Emergence |
| RSD11-2022 | University of Brighton | Possibilities and Practices |
| RSD10-2021 | TU Delft | Playing with Tensions |
| RSD9-2020 | National Institute of Design | Systemic Design for Well-Being |
| RSD8-2019 | IIT Institute of Design | Complex Spaces of Innovation |
| RSD7-2018 | Politecnico di Torino | Challenging Complexity |
| RSD6-2017 | Oslo School of Architecture and Design | Flourishing Together |
| RSD5-2016 | OCAD University and MaRS | Systemic Design for Social Complexity |
| RSD4-2015 | Systemic Design Research Network | Developing a Systemic Design Research Network |
| RSD3-2014 | Oslo School of Architecture and Design | Relating Systems Thinking and Design |
| RSD2-2013 | Oslo School of Architecture and Design | The Systemic Design Movement |
| RSD1-2012 | Oslo School of Architecture and Design | Seminar: Relating Systems Thinking and Design |

== See also ==
- Systems thinking
- Systems-oriented design
- Design thinking
- Service design
- Transition design
- Participatory design
- Wicked problem
- Complex adaptive system
- Systemic Design Association
