= Food Processing Technology Building =

Georgia Tech campus structure

Coordinates: 33.77042°N 84.40347°W

- Interactive map of the Food Processing Technology Building area

General information
- Location: Atlanta, Georgia, USA, 640 Strong Street
- Current tenants: GTRI Food Processing Technology Division
- Completed: Spring 2005
- Inaugurated: May 19, 2005
- Owner: Georgia Institute of Technology

The Food Processing Technology Building is a Georgia Institute of Technology and Georgia Tech Research Institute facility. It houses the Food Processing Technology Division of GTRI, which includes the Agricultural Technology Research Program (ATRP) and Georgia’s Traditional Industries Program for Food Processing. It opened on March 1, 2005, and was dedicated on May 19, 2005.

== Facilities ==
The Food Processing Technology Building contains over 36,000 square feet of office and laboratory space, including a 4,370 square foot high-bay testing and fabrication space, a 16-by-24-foot climate-controlled experiment chamber, an indoor environmental pilot area, a full-service chemical wet laboratory, and a 48-seat auditorium. The building houses five research laboratories: an automation research laboratory, an electronics lab, a systems development and integration laboratory, an environmental laboratory, and an optics laboratory. The building's lower lobby area features an interactive exhibit about the role of technology in poultry and food processing.
