= ATRP =

ATRP may refer to:

- GTRI Agricultural Technology Research Program
- Atom transfer radical polymerization
- Avios Travel Rewards Programme
