= HID =

HID may refer to:

== Science and technology ==
- Hardware interface design, a cross-disciplinary design field that shapes the physical connection between people and technology
- Helium ionization detector
- High-intensity discharge, a type of lamp
- Human-implantable device, a device that can be installed in the human body
- Human interface device, a computer device that interacts with humans
  - USB human interface device class (USB HID class)
- Hystrix-like ichthyosis–deafness syndrome

== Organizations ==
- HID Global, an American manufacturing company
- Croatian Interdisciplinary Society (Croatian: Hrvatsko interdisciplinarno društvo), a non-governmental organization
- Most–Híd, a political party in Slovakia

== Places ==
- Hall i' th' Wood railway station (Station code), in England
- Horn Island Airport, in Queensland, Australia
- Hidalgo (state), Mexico (abbreviated: HID or MX-HID)

== Other uses ==
- Hidatsa language, spoken in the United States
- Stefani Hid (born 1985), Indonesian writer

== See also ==
- HIDS (disambiguation)
