= Applied Artificial Intelligence =

- Discipline: Artificial intelligence
- Language: English
- Edited by: Robert Trappl

Publication details
- History: 1987–present
- Publisher: Taylor & Francis
- Frequency: 10/year
- Impact factor: 2.777 (2021)

Standard abbreviations
- ISO 4: Appl. Artif. Intell.

Indexing
- CODEN: AAINEH
- ISSN: 0883-9514 (print); 1087-6545 (web)
- LCCN: 87654263
- OCLC no.: 728399177

Links
- Journal homepage; Online access; Online archive

Applied Artificial Intelligence is a peer-reviewed scientific journal covering applications of artificial intelligence in management, industry, engineering, administration, and education, as well as evaluations of existing AI systems and tools and their economic, social, and cultural impact.

== Abstracting and indexing ==
The journal is abstracted and indexed in:

- ACM Guide to Computing Literature
- CompuMath Citation Index
- Current Contents/Engineering
- Computer & Information Systems Abstracts
- Electronics & Communications Abstracts
- Mechanical Engineering Abstracts
- Inspec
- PsycINFO
