= Matjaž Mulej =

Slovenian academic (born 1941)

- Born: 20 January 1941 (age 85)
- Education: University of Maribor
- Occupation: Academic

Matjaž Mulej (born Maribor, 20 January 1941) is a Slovenian academic. He is a member of the European Academy of Sciences and Arts.

== Personal life ==
He has a B.A. in economic analysis, a M.A. in Development Economics, as well as Doctorates in Economics/Systems Theory, and in Management/Innovation Management.

Matjaž Mulej is also known as an active sportsman. He is a two-time Yugoslavian tennis champion and has been a sports official for more than 35 years.

He has been married for more than 50 years and has two adult children and four grandchildren.

== Career ==
Mulej worked as a full professor and scientific associate at the Institute for Entrepreneurship and Management of Small Businesses. From 1987 to 1991 he was the Dean of the Faculty of Economics and Business and Vice-Rector of the University of Maribor.

He retired from University of Maribor as Professor Emeritus in Systems and Innovation Theory. He has more than 1,600 publications in more than 40 countries. He has more than 60 publications and close to 400 citations. He was visiting professor abroad for 15 semesters - including Cornell University and other Universities in Austria, China, Germany, Mexico and USA. He has served as consultant or speaker in/for enterprises - about 500 times in six countries.

He is the former (2006-2010) President of the IFSR (international systemic research) and member of several editorial committees of magazines and conferences, including almost all 30 PODIM conferences, all 9 Stiqe conferences and all 5 IRDO conferences.

== Bibliography ==
- Dialectical Systems Theory
- Innovative Business Paradigm for countries/enterprises
- Methods of creative interdisciplinary cooperation

== Recognition ==
Mulej was nominated to become a member of the New York Academy of Sciences in 1996, the European Academy of Sciences and Arts, Salzburg (2004), the European Academy of Sciences, Arts and Humanities, Paris in 2004 and the International Academy for Systems and Cybernetic Sciences in 2010. He served as the President of the latter until 2012. He was President of the International Federation for Systems Research from 2006 to 2010.

He received many rewards for his work on the systems approach to innovation in Yugoslavia, Slovenia, Maribor and University of Maribor.
