= Koppelaar =

Koppelaar is a surname. Notable people with the surname include:

- Frans Koppelaar (born 1943), Dutch painter
- Henk Koppelaar (born 1953), Dutch computer scientist
- Rutger Koppelaar (born 1993), Dutch athlete
