= Activity system =

Activity system can refer to different systems:

In medicine or anatomy:

- As an older name for the Musculoskeletal system

As shorthand for:

- A model employed in Soft systems methodology
