= Proposed wildlife crossings in Jackson, Wyoming =

2019 ballot proposal in Jackson, Wyoming, US

Many animal migration patterns are still intact in the greater Jackson area due to the large quantity of protected land. Large animals such as elk, mule deer, and pronghorn have separate winter and summer habitats and are moving in the spring and fall. Elk, moose, and other large animals also converge in the low-lying areas around Jackson during the winter months to escape deep snow at higher elevations. All of this movement increases the likelihood of wildlife-vehicle collisions on roads.

Jackson and Teton County have recorded over 5,000 wildlife–vehicle collisions since 1990. As a result, the Western Transportation Institute (WTI) was tasked with completing a report to examine the feasibility of a wildlife-crossing master plan. In May 2018, the WTI and Teton County published the Teton County Wildlife Crossing Master Plan. The master plan studied and identified seven highway segments suitable for wildlife crossings and other vehicle-collision mitigation. These highways include U.S. Route 191 (US 191), US 26, US 89, US 26, Wyoming Highway 220 (WYO 22) and WYO 390.

== Overview ==
From 2010 to 2018, 43 animal species were recorded in Teton County's wildlife–vehicle collision database. Elk (327 collisions), moose (143), and mule deer (1,427) had the largest numbers of collisions in the Jackson area. The WTI examined crash and carcass data when it developed the Teton County Wildlife Crossing Master Plan. Although the data tends to reflect large- and medium-sized collisions, safety and conservation concerns extend beyond these documented encounters; ecological concerns extend to aquatic habitats and fish populations.

Although traffic and animal-migration patterns vary by season, there is a constant presence of vehicular traffic and large mammals in and around Jackson. Each of the seven identified highways averages 10,000 vehicles per day, with volumes varying from 23,000 vehicles per day at peak season on one road to 1,500 vehicles per day on the lowest-volume stretch of highway.

=== Human safety and economic impact ===
Vehicle collisions with large mammals can result in property damage, injury and death. The Wyoming Department of Transportation (WYDOT) estimates that there is a 79-percent chance of a driver's colliding with wildlife on Wyoming roads. WYDOT also estimates that these collisions result in $50 million in damage per year (vehicle damage and personal-injury costs). WYDOT estimates that the average animal collision in Wyoming will cost a driver $11,600. In a 2003 study by the Jackson Hole Wildlife Foundation, it was estimated that wildlife collisions in Teton County cost $1.2 million per year. More recently, the Jackson Hole Wildlife Foundation completed an economic impact assessment for 2016-2017 that found total economic loss from wildlife collisions to be $3,172,837 in Teton County.

The Nature Conservancy (TNC) estimates that wildlife collisions cost Wyoming drivers $25 million in injury and property damage, and $24 million to taxpayers in lost wildlife productivity. TNC also estimates that Wyoming wildlife collision costs involving mule deer, elk and moose are $10,500, $25,319, and $37,873, respectively. A number of studies document the economic value of wildlife, including the major local economic drivers of tourism, recreation and hunting. Studies indicate that there are approximately 211 fatalities and 29,000 human injuries in the United States each year due to vehicle collisions with wildlife.

=== Biological conservation ===
Wildlife is impacted by roads and traffic in five broad categories: loss of habitat, road mortality, barriers to wildlife movement, decreases in habitat quality, and the introduction of non-native species. These categories are used to estimate the impact of roads on biological conservation. In addition to deer, elk and moose, animals with high conservation value in the area include river otter, lynx, grizzly bear, and bison. According to Anthony Clevenger of the WTI, "generalizations about the conservation value of habitat corridors remain elusive because of the species-specific nature of the problem". Due to the complex nature of habitats in and around Jackson, the Teton County Wildlife Crossing Master Plan evaluates the biological conservation value of each roadway based on the migration patterns of large and medium-sized mammals most likely to encounter vehicle traffic on a specific route.

The Jackson Hole Wildlife Foundation (JHWF) demonstrated the urgency of this problem by tracking moose-specific deaths due to vehicle collisions in the Jackson area. JHWF tracked 50 moose deaths due to collisions over a decade, and compared that to the estimated 70 moose that live near town. Their research indicates that this moose population could be at risk due to the frequency of collisions. JHWF believes that it "can save an average of 190 moose, 210 elk and 360 deer every 20 years" with the construction of wildlife crossings.

In assessing biological conservation value, the concept of ecological permeability becomes an important element of the master plan. Ecological permeability has broad scientific consensus. Although vehicle–wildlife collisions are the most acute aspect of biological conservation with respect to wildlife overpasses, the ability for species to migrate and interact with the larger ecosystem is considered crucial for the health and maintenance of species and ecosystem. Research also demonstrates that facilitating permeability requires that wildlife crossings be species-specific; for example, ungulates prefer overpasses and carnivores prefer underpasses. The Teton County Master Plan takes these biological-conservation and permeability factors into account in its analysis and planning process.

== Proposed locations ==
The Teton County Wildlife Crossing Master Plan has identified 12 crossing priorities, and has ranked the locations based on eight criteria: land security, political viability, key-partner support, technical feasibility, long-term solution, human-safety impact, wildlife-mortality impact, and habitat connectivity value. Among other data sets, the master-plan research team used extensive nature mapping, collision data, WYDOT traffic data, and migration data for mule deer, elk and moose to compile the rankings.

Research indicates that combining wildlife crossings with other mitigation measures can result in an 83-percent reduction in collisions. Without complex planning and the integration of multiple measures, an average mitigation reduces collisions by 40 percent. Some advocates cite statistics indicating that a combination of fencing and crossing structures can reduce collisions by 90 percent.

Recommended crossing locations are ranked as follows:

1. Highway 22 / 390 Intersection / Snake River Bridge
2. Highway 22 Spring Creek to Bar Y
3. Camp Creek (near-term, non-structural measures)
4. Camp Creek (Hoback Junction to Hoback Canyon)
5. North of Jackson to Fish Hatchery
6. South of Jackson to Rafter J
7. Horse Creek to Hoback Junction
8. Broadway (Flat Creek Bridge near five-way intersection to High School Road)
9. Teton Pass west side (WY 22 and ID 33)
10. Game Creek, Dog Creek (South of Highway 89)
11. Blackrock / Togwotee
12. WY 390 north of the Highway 22 / 390 intersection.

The Teton County Wildlife Crossing Master Plan evaluates and recommends the site-specific use of warning signs and animal-detection systems, speed management, wildlife fencing, wildlife crossings (overpasses and underpasses), and multiple-use structures.

Wildlife-collision mitigation systems vary in complexity, cost and design. A number of studies indicate a high success rate when mitigation measures are designed with target species in mind, rather than being applied broadly to a region. Other studies indicate the highest rate of success when several mitigation measures, such as crossing structures and fencing, are used in conjunction.

=== Wildlife warning signs and animal-detection systems ===
Studies indicate that wildlife warning signs can reduce collisions by nine to 50 percent, and Teton County has a variety of warning signs in place. Animal-detection systems that alert drivers when an animal is active in the area can reduce collisions by 33 to 97 percent.

=== Speed management ===
Speed limits vary along the target roads between 25 and 65 miles per hour (40 and 105 km/h), with the average speed limit 55 miles per hour (89 km/h) (variable speed limits, depending on daylight, are set along two stretches of highway). Since research shows that most collisions occur at dawn and dusk, Teton County has implemented variable speed limits that decrease driving speeds at night. The master plan does not recommend a general reduction in speed limits, however, due to a possible negative impact on safe highway driving.

=== Wildlife fences ===
The master plan cites four studies indicating that wildlife fences are "one of the most effective and robust mitigation measures to reduce collisions with large animals." Wildlife fencing can keep animals off the road and funnel them to safe crossing locations. Best practices should be used to ensure that fencing is species-specific, minimizing larger ecological impacts.

=== Wildlife crossings ===
There are numerous types of wildlife crossings that can be implemented in Teton County. These include overpasses, open span bridges, underpasses and pipes. Similar to wildlife fencing, the success of crossings depends on their design process and how they relate to target species. The Master Plan used existing research to make recommendations based on animal type, including six ungulate species and eight carnivore species.

=== Multiple-use structures ===
Multiple use structures facilitate the movement of humans and wildlife. Although the master plan evaluated their feasibility, it does not recommend them due to their potential to increase the number of vehicle-wildlife collisions.

== Funding ==
Teton County allocated $150,000 in the 2019 fiscal year budget to jump-start early planning and design for wildlife crossing and other mitigation. Although the county has used the master plan to prioritize projects, it does not have a public assessment of their total cost. In addition to the Teton County plan, WYDOT has completed a project along a 12-mile (19 km) stretch of US Highway 191. The project built six underpasses, two overpasses and installed fencing to enhance safety during the annual pronghorn-sheep migration.

WYDOT has allocated $3.5 million for a crossing at the HWY 22 / 390 intersection, with an estimated total project cost of $7.5 million. It also plans to set aside $900,000 to extend an animal underpass along the same stretch of road.

To facilitate the construction of wildlife crossings closer to Jackson, advocacy groups lobbied to include a $15 million wildlife-crossing program in the list of items funded by a special-purpose excise tax (SPET). The SPET, which will be voted on in November 2019, would enable Jackson and Teton County to begin the construction of wildlife crossings and supplement WYDOT funding for specific projects.

On July 15, 2019, Teton County and Jackson officials approved a ballot initiative that allows residents to vote for 10 projects totaling $77 million. The language approved by officials allows citizens to select any or all of the initiatives, which would be funded by a one-percent sales tax. After a brief discussion about bundling the 10 projects into an all-or-nothing ballot measure, elected officials opted to let voters choose each item independently. In the vote removing the "bundling" language, officials elected to add a $10 million initiative for wildlife crossings ($5 million less than the amount proposed by advocates) within the list of 10 projects put to voter approval in November 2019.
