= De Vree =

De Vree is a surname. Notable people with the surname include:

- Henk de Vree (1954), Dutch politician
- Nicolaes de Vree (1645–1702), Dutch Golden Age painter
- Johan de Vree (1938–2017), Dutch political scientist
- Freddy de Vree (1939–2004), Belgian poet, literary critic, and radiomaker
