= Complexity (journal) =

- Discipline: Complex systems
- Language: English

Publication details
- History: 1995–present
- Publisher: John Wiley & Sons
- Frequency: Continuously
- Impact factor: 2.833 (2020)

Standard abbreviations
- ISO 4: Complexity

Indexing
- CODEN: COMPFS
- ISSN: 1076-2787 (print); 1099-0526 (web)
- LCCN: 95641033
- OCLC no.: 30446118

Links
- Journal homepage; Online archive (2017-present); Online archive (1995-2016)

Complexity is a peer-reviewed open-access scientific journal covering the field of complex adaptive systems. The journal's scope includes Chaos theory, genetic algorithms, cellular automata, neural networks, evolutionary game theory, and econophysics. It was established in 1995 and is published by John Wiley & Sons.

== Abstracting and indexing ==
The journal is abstracted and indexed in:

- Biological Abstracts
- BIOSIS Previews
- CompuMath Citation Index
- Computer & Information Systems Abstracts
- Computing Reviews
- Current Index to Statistics
- Elsevier BIOBASE
- Inspec
- Science Citation Index Expanded
- Scopus

The journal was also initially indexed in some mathematical databases:

- MathSciNet (1995–2018)
- ZbMATH Open (1995-2020)

According to the Journal Citation Reports, the journal has a 2020 impact factor of 2.833.

== See also ==
- List of systems science journals
