= List of systems science journals =

Systems science is an interdisciplinary field of science that studies the nature of complex systems in nature, society, and science. It aims to develop interdisciplinary foundations, which are applicable in a variety of areas, such as engineering, biology, medicine and social sciences.

Systems sciences covers formal sciences fields like complex systems, cybernetics, dynamical systems theory, and systems theory, and applications in the field of the natural and social sciences and engineering, such as control theory, operations research, social systems theory, systems biology, systems dynamics, systems ecology, systems engineering and systems psychology.

== A ==
- Advances in Systems Science and Applications
- Annals of Systems Research: from 1971 until 1978
- Annual Review of Ecology, Evolution, and Systematics

== B ==
- Behavioral Science: from 1956 until 1996, then became Systems Research and Behavioral Science

== C ==
- Complex Systems
- Complexity

== E ==
- Enacting Cybernetics
- Ecological Complexity
- European Journal of Information Systems

== G ==
- General Systems Yearbook: from 1956 until 1987, and then published in Systems Research and Behavioral Science

== I ==
- IEEE Intelligent Systems
- IEEE Transactions on Systems, Man, and Cybernetics
- IEEE Transactions on Control Systems Technology
- Information Systems Research
- Interdisciplinary Description of Complex Systems
- Interfaces: An International Journal of the Institute for Operations Research and the Management Science
- International Journal of General Systems

== K ==
- Kybernetes

== J ==
- Journal of the Association for Information Systems
- Journal of Computer and System Sciences
- Journal of Environmental Engineering
- Journal of Management Information Systems
- Journal of Research Practice
- Journal of Systems and Software

== M ==
- Mathematics of Operations Research

== S ==
- Systems Research and Behavioral Science: since 1996, formed from Behavioral Science (1956–1996) and Systems Research (1984–1995)

== See also ==
- List of systems engineering at universities
- List of systems engineering books
- List of systems scientists
