= The Journal of Defense Modeling and Simulation =

- Discipline: Engineering, computing
- Language: English
- Edited by: Jerry M. Couretas

Publication details
- History: 2004-present
- Publisher: SAGE Publications
- Frequency: Quarterly

Standard abbreviations
- ISO 4: J. Def. Model. Simul.

Indexing
- ISSN: 1548-5129
- LCCN: 2004212102
- OCLC no.: 488590415

Links
- Journal homepage; Online access; Online archive

The Journal of Defense Modeling and Simulation is a quarterly peer-reviewed academic journal that covers the field of engineering, especially modeling and simulation as it relates to the military and defense. The editor-in-chief is Jerry M. Couretas (Lockheed Martin Corporation). It was established in 2004 and is currently published by SAGE Publications on behalf of the Society for Modeling and Simulation International.

== Abstracting and indexing ==
The Journal of Defense Modeling and Simulation is abstracted and indexed in:

- Biostatistica
- CompuMath Citation Index
- Current Contents/Engineering, Computing, & Technology
- Current Index to Statistics
- Engineering Citation Index
- Scopus
