= Cybernetics and Systems =

Scientific journal of cybernetics and systems science

- Discipline: Cybernetics, systems science, artificial intelligence
- Language: English
- Edited by: Robert Trappl

Publication details
- Former name: Journal of Cybernetics
- History: 1971-present
- Publisher: Taylor & Francis
- Frequency: 8/year
- Impact factor: 2.423 (2020)

Standard abbreviations
- ISO 4: Cybern. Syst.

Indexing
- ISSN: 0196-9722 (print); 1087-6553 (web)
- LCCN: 80648526

Links
- Journal homepage; Online access

Cybernetics and Systems is a peer-reviewed scientific journal of cybernetics and systems science, including artificial intelligence, computer science, cybernetics, human computer intelligence, information and communication technology, machine learning, and robotics. The journal was established in 1971 as Journal of Cybernetics and obtained its current title in 1980. It is published by Taylor & Francis in cooperation with the Austrian Society for Cybernetic Studies and the editor-in-chief is Robert Trappl.

== Abstracting and indexing ==
Cybernetics and Systems is abstracted and indexed in:

- ACM Guide to Computing Literature
- BIOSIS Previews
- CompuMath Citation Index
- CSA Computer Abstracts
- CSA Computer & Information Systems Abstracts
- CSA Electronics & Communications Abstracts
- CSA Environmental Engineering Abstracts
- CSA Environmental Sciences & Pollution Management Database
- CSA Solid State & Superconductivity Abstracts
- Current Contents/Engineering
- Engineering Information
- Inspec
- Scopus
- Science Citation Index Expanded
- Zentralblatt MATH

According to the Journal Citation Reports, the journal has a 2016 impact factor of 1.434, ranking it 12th out of 22 journals in the category "Computer Science, Cybernetics"
