= Gerrit Broekstra =

Dutch scientist and professor

Gerrit Broekstra (born 1 August 1941, Alkmaar, Netherlands), is a Dutch scientist and professor in the field of organization behavior and systems sciences at the Erasmus Universiteit, Rotterdam, Northwestern University, Chicago, and Nyenrode Business University in the Netherlands.

== Biography ==
Broekstra was born in 1941 in Alkmaar in the Netherlands. He received an Engineer's degree in physics in 1966 from the Delft University of Technology and earned his PhD in physics in 1973 at the Eindhoven University of Technology in The Netherlands.

From 1966-1973 he was a manager of the fast-growing Physics Department of the National Defense Organization of TNO. In 1978 he was the first engineer to be elected as a Research Fellow of the Netherlands Institute for Advanced Study (NIAS) in Wassenaar, the Netherlands. In 1973 he joined the business school which became later the Rotterdam School of Management of the Erasmus University, of which he was the first dean. Since the 1980s he is a professor of organization behavior and systems sciences at the Erasmus Universiteit in Rotterdam, the Kellogg School of Management, Northwestern University in Chicago and the Nyenrode Business University in the Netherlands. He also serves on the editorial boards of various international journals.

Broekstra has been organisationally active in the systems movement. For eight years he was the President of the Dutch Systems Society, the 'Systeemgroep Nederland'. He was the third President of the International Federation for Systems Research in Vienna. He is on the Advisory Board of the International Institute for General Systems Studies. He was program director of the Rabobank Executive MBA and executive dean of the Nyenrode Executive Management Development Center.

== Work ==
During his career Broekstra has focused on themes such as intelligent organizations and organizational renewal through applying concepts from chaos, complexity and systems science. He has also initiated or spearheaded various educational programs, and "consulting projects for multi-nationals such as SHV, KLM, Mercedes-Benz, Cosun, Arcadis, Ten Cate, Rabobank, and more, and has a substantial record in designing and facilitating Strategic Search Conferences for both business and government".

== Publications ==
Broekstra has written over a hundred books and articles in international journals and conference proceedings. Books, a selection:

- Systemen en Toekomstverkenning: Onder Auspiciën Van De Systeemgroep Nederland', with J. S. Knipscheer and the Dutch Systems Group, E. Stenfert Kroese, ISBN 90-207-0643-8 (90-207-0643-8)
- 1989, Creating intelligent organizations. Delft: Eburon.
- 1992, Science, Management and Entrepreneurship, with J. Bartel, Leiden: Stenfert Kroese Publishers.
- 2009, Deep leadership: the secret of right action in uncertain times. Kampen: TenHave (in Dutch).
- 2014, Building high-performance, high-trust organizations: Decentralization 2.0. London: PalgraveMacmillan.

Articles, a selection:

- 1994, 'Problems of chaotic simplicity: Weaver revisited', in: Robert Trappl (ed.) Cybernetics & Systems '94. Singapore: World Scientific.
- 1996, 'A complexity perspective of organizing', in: Robert Trappl (ed.) Cybernetics & Systems '96. Vienna: Austr. Soc. Cybernetics Studies.
- 1996, 'The triune brain metaphor: the evolution of the living organization', in: D. Grant & C. Oswick (eds.) Metaphor and organizations. London: Sage Publications.
- 1997, Organizations are Closed Systems, in: Glanville, "Problems of Excavating Cybernetics and Systems," Special Issue of Systemica. Southsea (UK): BKS.
- 1998, 'Unmanagement: Do the Emperors still have Clothes,' in: Robert Trappl, Cybernetics and Systems '98. Vienna: Austrian Society for Cybernetic Studies.
- 1998, 'An organization is a conversation', in: D. Grant, T. Keenoy & C. Oswick (eds.), Discourse and organization. London: Sage Publications.
- 2002, 'A synergetics approach to disruptive innovation', Kybernetes, the Int. J. Systems & Cybernetics, vol. 31, no 9/10, pp. 1249–1259.
- 2005, 'Bubble, critical zone and the crash of Royal Ahold' (with Didier Sornette & Wei-Xing Zhou), Physica A 346, pp. 529–560.
