= Paolo Petta =

Italian computer and cognitive scientist

Paolo Petta is an Italian computer and cognitive scientist who is the head of the Intelligent Software Agents and New Media Research Group at the Austrian Research Institute for Artificial Intelligence. His main research areas include cognitive modelling of emotions, human aspects in interactions with artificial systems and coordination of situated cognitive systems.

== Biography ==
Paolo Petta earned his Ph.D. in Computer Science (specialisation: Artificial Intelligence) from the Vienna University of Technology (Technische Universität Wien) in 1994. Since 1996, he is the head of the Intelligent Agents and New Media group at the Austrian Research Institute for Artificial Intelligence (OFAI) in Vienna, Austria. Since 1989, he has been teaching at the University of Vienna, the Vienna University of Technology, and the Medical University of Vienna on selected topics of Artificial Intelligence, Agent-based Technologies and Cognitive Science.

== Publications ==
- 1997. Creating Personalities for Synthetic Actors, Heidelberg/New York: Springer.
- 2003. Emotions in Humans and Artifacts, Cambridge: MIT Press.
- 2008. Intelligent Information Agents: The AgentLink Perspective, Heidelberg/New York: Springer.
- 2011. Emotion-Oriented Systems: The Humaine Handbook, Springer, Heidelberg/Dordrecht/London/New York, 2011.
