= Henk Volberda =

Henk W. Volberda (born 1964) is a Dutch organizational theorist, management consultant, and Professor of Strategic Management and Innovation at Amsterdam Business School, University of Amsterdam. He is known for his contributions in the field of strategic renewal, coevolution and new organizational forms.

== Biography ==
Born in Sneek, Volberda received his MA in Business Administration at the University of Groningen in 1987, and his PhD in 1991 under guidance of Ton de Leeuw for the thesis "Organizational flexibility: change and preservation : a flexibility audit & redesign method".

In 1987 Volberda started as management consultant trainee for the Dutch consultancy firm Twynstra Gudde, and as Assistant Professor at the University of Groningen. In 1991 he moved to Rotterdam, where he became Assistant Professor of Strategic Management at the Rotterdam School of Management of the Erasmus University Rotterdam, in 1995 Associate Professor and from 1998 to 2018 Professor of Strategic Management & Business Policy. Since January 2019 he is faculty at the University of Amsterdam.

Volberda is member of the editorial boards of Long Range Planning, the Journal of International Business Studies, the Global Journal of Flexible Systems Management, Management Executive, and member of the editorial review boards of the Journal of Management Studies, and the Journal of Strategy and Management, Organization Science and Organization Studies.

Volberda was awarded the NCD Award, the ERASM Research Award, the Erasmus University Research Award, the Igor Ansoff Strategic Management Award, Cap Gemini Ernst & Young Strategy Award, the Erim Impact Award and the SAP Strategy Award.

== Publications ==
Books, a selection:

- 1991. Organizational flexibility: change and preservation : a flexibility audit & redesign method. University of Groningen.
- 1998. Building the Flexible Firm: How to Remain Competitive. Oxford University Press
- 2001. "Rethinking Strategy", editor together with Tom Elfring. Sage
- 2004. "De Flexibele Onderneming, Strategieën voor Succesvol Concurreren." Deventer : Kluwer.
- 2011. "Innovation 3.0 - Slimmer". Dutch only. Amsterdam: Mediawerf.
- 2011. "Strategic Management: Competitiveness and Globalization, Concepts and Cases", 1st Edition, together with others. Cengage Learning Emea.

Articles, a selection:

- De Leeuw, Antonius CJ, and Henk W. Volberda. "On the concept of flexibility: a dual control perspective." Omega 24.2 (1996): 121–139.
- Volberda, Henk W. "Toward the flexible form: How to remain vital in hypercompetitive environments." Organization science 7.4 (1996): 359–374.
- Van Den Bosch, Frans AJ, Henk W. Volberda, and Michiel De Boer. "Coevolution of firm absorptive capacity and knowledge environment: Organizational forms and combinative capabilities." Organization Science 10.5 (1999): 551–568.
- Lewin, Arie Y., and Henk W. Volberda. "Prolegomena on coevolution: A framework for research on strategy and new organizational forms." Organization science 10.5 (1999): 519–534.
- Jansen, Justin JP, Frans AJ Van Den Bosch, and Henk W. Volberda. "Managing potential and realized absorptive capacity: how do organizational antecedents matter?." Academy of Management Journal 48.6 (2005): 999–1015.
- Jansen, Justin JP, Frans AJ Van Den Bosch, and Henk W. Volberda. "Exploratory innovation, exploitative innovation, and performance: Effects of organizational antecedents and environmental moderators." Management science 52.11 (2006): 1661–1674.
