= Borgharen =

- Town
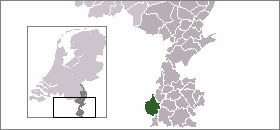

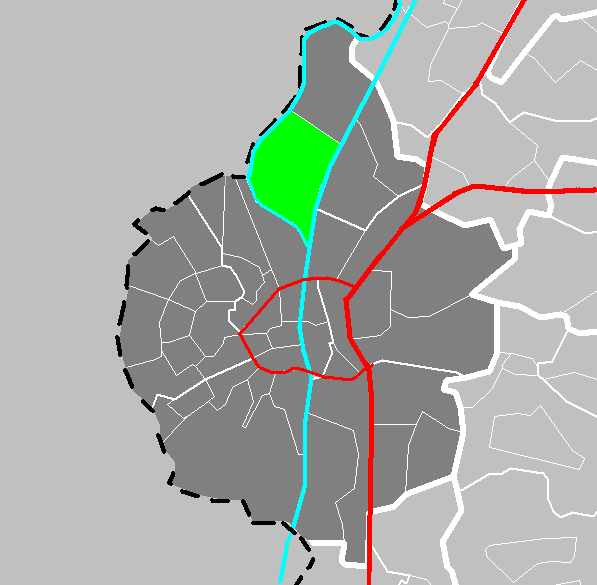
- Coordinates: 50°53′N 5°41′E
- Country: Netherlands
- Province: Limburg
- Municipality: Maastricht

Area
  - Total: 3.52 km^{2} (1.36 sq mi)

Population
  - Total: 1,857

Borgharen (Dutch pronunciation: [ˌbɔr(ə)xˈɦaːrə(n)]; Limburgish: Hare [ˈɦaːʀə]) is a town in the Dutch province of Limburg. It is a part of the municipality of Maastricht, and lies about 3 km north of Maastricht. Until 1970, it was a separate municipality.

In 2001, Borgharen had 1814 inhabitants. The built-up area of the town was 0.34 km^{2} (0.13 sq mi), and contained 732 residences.

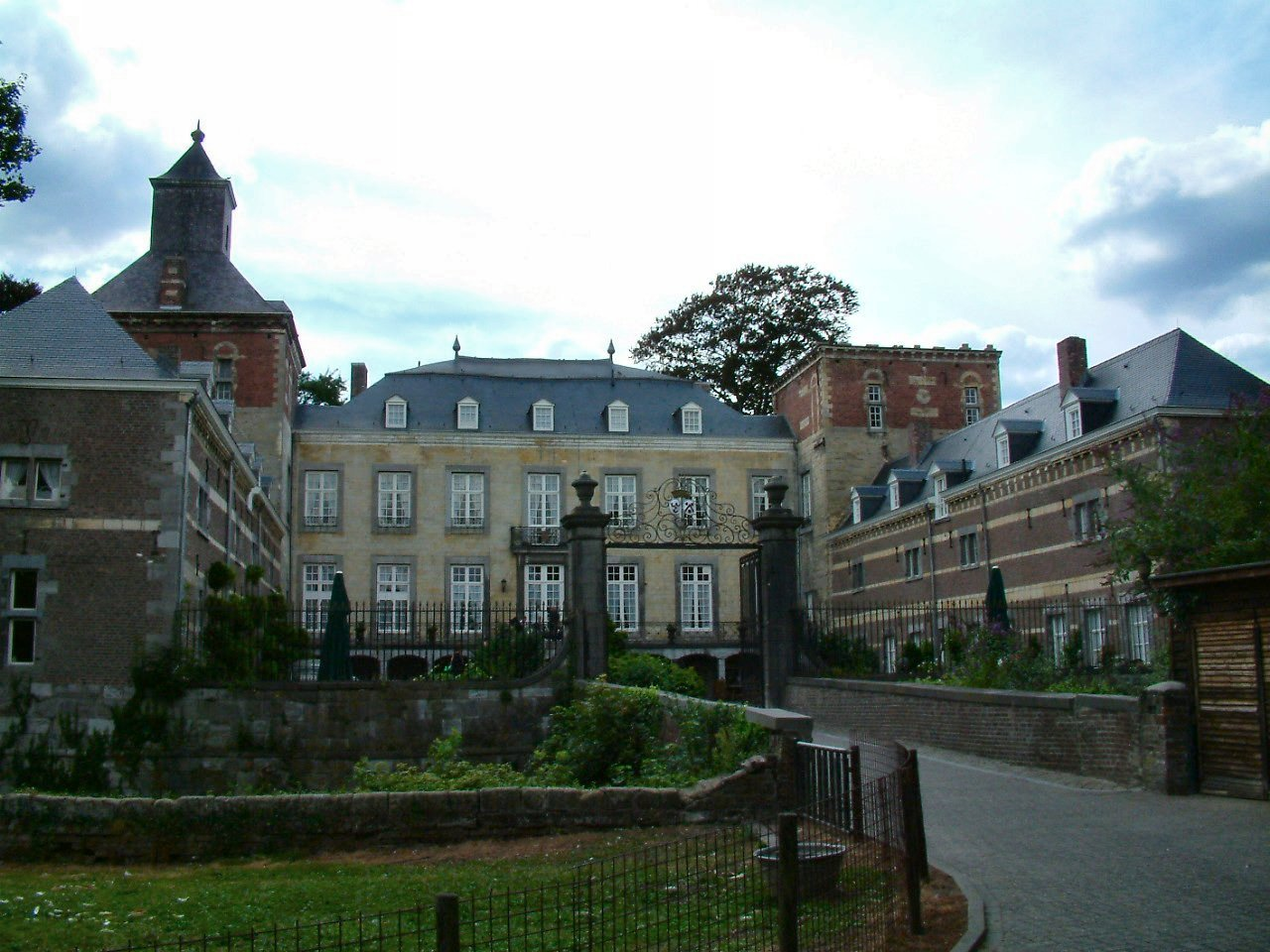
Borgharen Castle

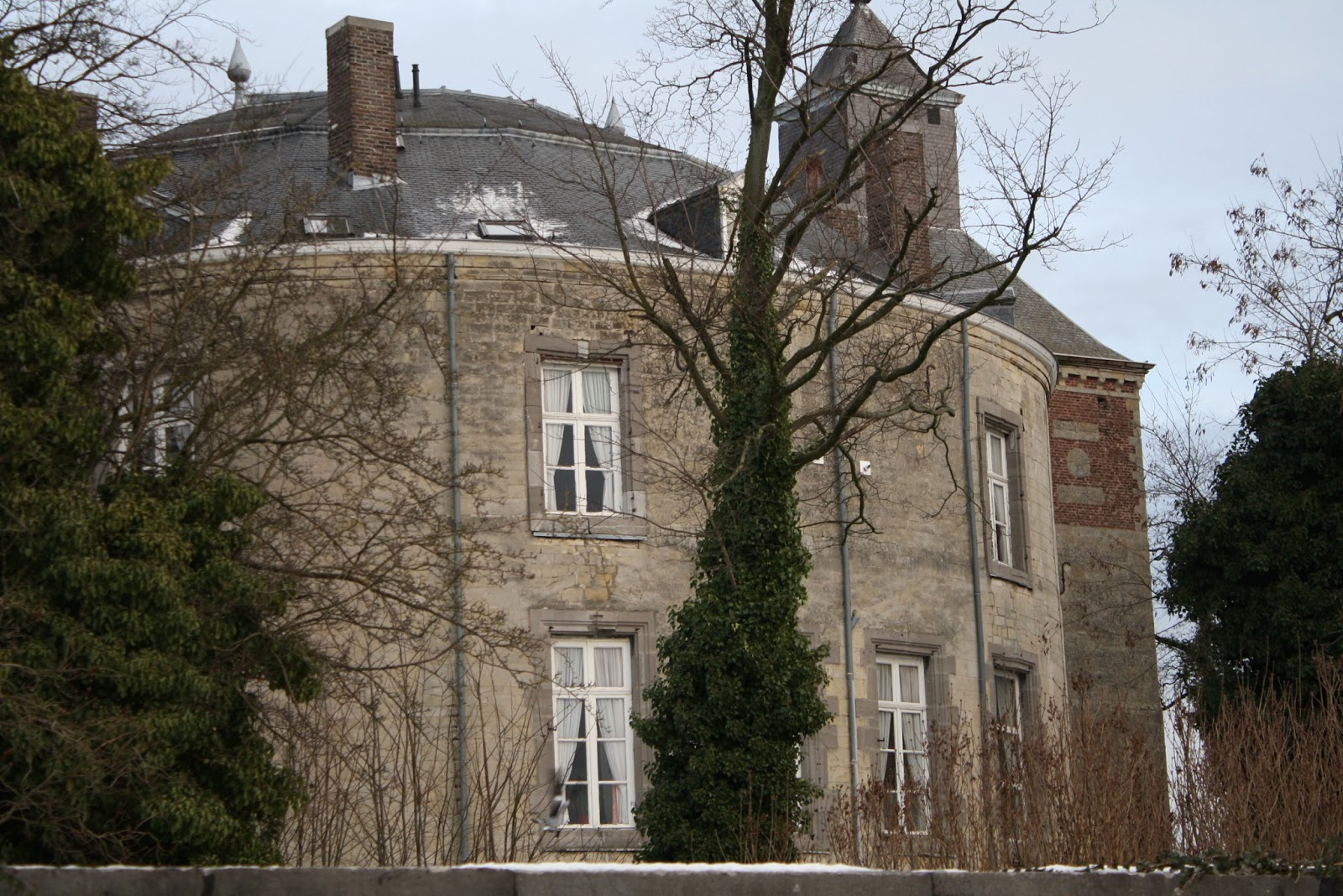
Borgharen Castle (view to the West)

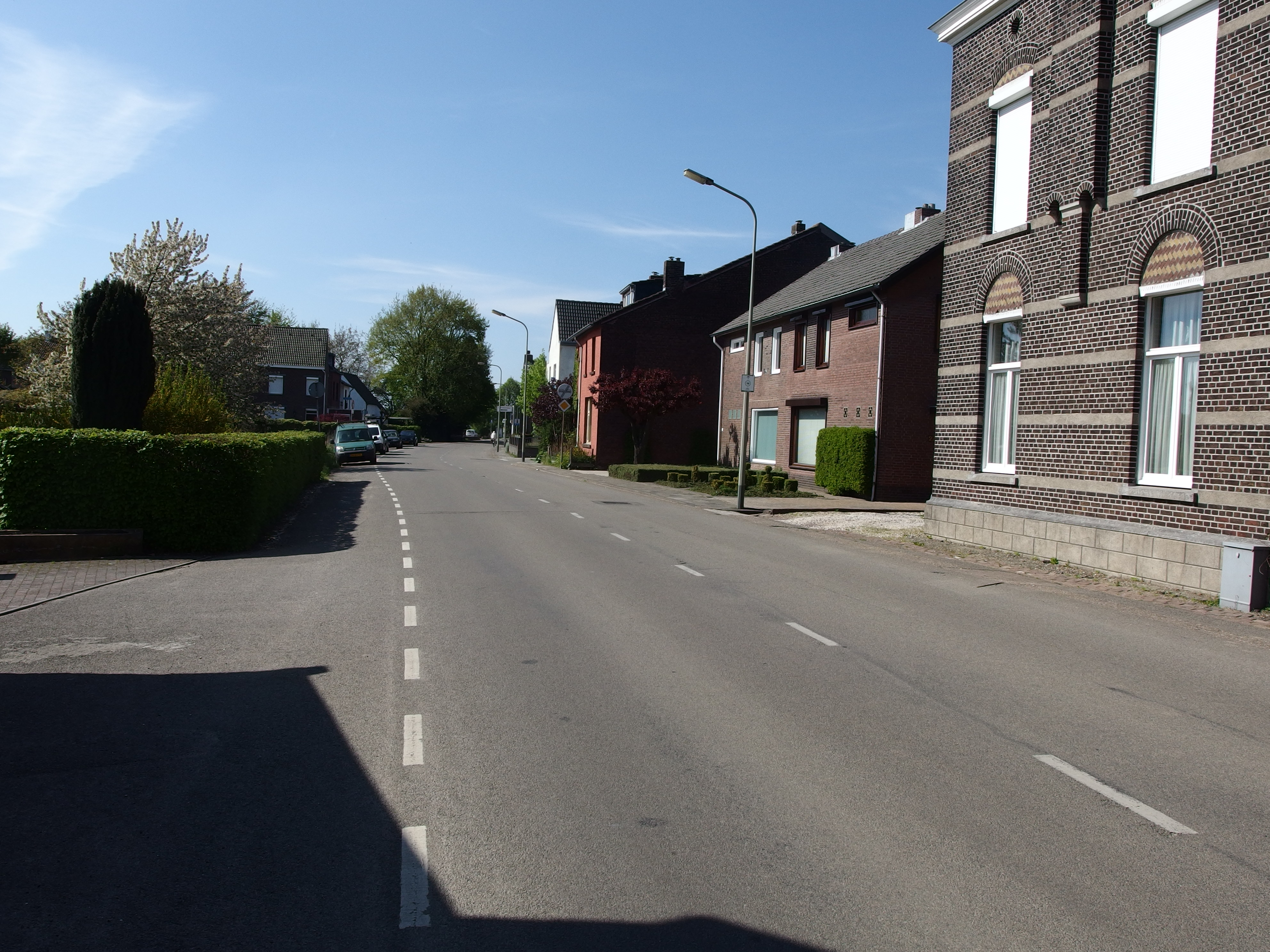
A Borgharen street

== People from Borgharen ==
- Paul Panhuysen (1934–2015), composer
- Johan de Vree (1938-2017), Dutch political scientist
