= International Journal of General Systems =

- Discipline: Systems sciences
- Language: English
- Edited by: Radim Belohlavek

Publication details
- History: 1974–present
- Publisher: Taylor and Francis
- Frequency: 8/year
- Impact factor: 1.637 (2014)

Standard abbreviations
- ISO 4: Int. J. Gen. Syst.

Indexing
- ISSN: 0308-1079 (print); 1563-5104 (web)
- OCLC no.: 49941638

Links
- Journal homepage; Online access; Online archive

The International Journal of General Systems is a peer-reviewed scientific journal covering research on basic and applied aspects of systems science and systems methodology. Its focus is on "general systems" – systems ideas that have general applicability. The founding editor of the journal was George Klir, who served as editor-in-chief from 1974 to 2014. Since 2015, the editor-in-chief has been Radim Belohlavek.

According to the Journal Citation Reports, the journal has a 2014 impact factor of 1.637.

== See also ==
- List of systems science journals
