= Joop Koppenjan =

Dutch political scientist

- Born: Johannes Franciscus Maria Koppenjan; 1955
- Education: Erasmus University Rotterdam
- Known for: Policy network analysis
- Scientific career
- Fields: Public Administration
- Workplaces: Erasmus University Rotterdam; Delft University of Technology
- Website: https://www.eur.nl/people/joop-koppenjan

Johannes Franciscus Maria (Joop) Koppenjan (born 1955) is a Dutch political scientist and Professor of Public Administration at the department of Public Administration at the Erasmus University Rotterdam. He is especially known for work on policy network analysis and his 2004 book Managing uncertainties in networks written with Erik-Hans Klijn.

Koppenjan started his studies at the teachers' academy St-Lucia Rotterdam in 1973, where he obtained his BA is 1979. He continued to study history at the Erasmus University Rotterdam, where he obtained his MA in social history in 1984. Subsequently, in 1986, he started his graduate studies at the Erasmus Universiteit Rotterdam, where he obtained his PhD in Public Administration in 1993.

Koppenjan started his academic career at the Erasmus University Rotterdam as a research assistant in 1985, and later assistant professor. In 1996 he moved to Delft University of Technology, where he became associate professor in public management. In this position he was projectleader of the research project "The Management of the RandstadRail Project" in 2007. Since 1995 he also participate in the Netherlands Institute of Government (NIG), where he became as senior staff member. In 2010 he was appointed Professor of Public Administration at the Erasmus University Rotterdam.

== Selected publications ==
- Kickert, Walter Julius Michael, and Johannes Franciscus Maria Koppenjan. Public management and network management: An overview. Netherlands Institute of Government, 1997.
- Kickert, Walter JM, Erik-Hans Klijn, and Johannes Franciscus Maria Koppenjan, eds. Managing complex networks: strategies for the public sector. Sage, 1997.
- Koppenjan, Johannes Franciscus Maria, and Erik-Hans Klijn. Managing uncertainties in networks: a network approach to problem solving and decision making. Psychology Press, 2004.
