= Albert Hanken =

Dutch mathematician and inventor

Albert Frederik Gerhard Hanken (9 October 1926, Hillegersberg, – Amstelveen, 21 December 2016) was a Dutch mathematician, inventor, and Emeritus Professor of systems theory at the University of Twente, known for his contributions to the field of systems theory and social analysis.

== Biography ==
Hanken studied mathematics and physics at the University of Twente and the VU University Amsterdam, and received his PhD in 1954 at the Ohio State University with the thesis, entitled "A method and a model for the analysis and description of car-following performance."

From 1955 to 1967 Hanken studied and worked in the United States. Early 1960s he worked for the Industrial Nucleonics Corporation in Ohio, where he developed and patented several measuring systems. From 1965 to 1967 he taught systems engineering at the Georgia Institute of Technology. In 1967 he moved back to the Netherlands to teach systems theory at the University of Twente and the Eindhoven University of Technology. From 1974 to 1986 he was Professor of Systems Theory at the University of Twente, specifically focussing on systems concepts and methods in the social sciences. Among his students were Ton de Leeuw, Walter Kickert and Nic Kramer.

Hanken made an important contribution to the introduction and spreading of systems theory in the Netherlands. In 1970 with Gerard de Zeeuw he cofounded the Dutch Systems Group. After his retirement in 1986 Hanken published several books on Eastern philosophy and mysticism.

Hanken died at home in Amstelveen and was buried at Zorgvlied.

== Work ==
=== Cybernetics and Society, 1981 ===
In his 1981 "Cybernetics and Society: An Analysis of Social Systems," Hanken explains, that there are different ways to analyse societies as a social systems. A common approach is to see society as a network of interacting persons or groups, called actors. In those days these actors were "usually represented by either stimulus response or normative models."

The problem with these analysis-techniques of social systems was, according to Hanken, that they were not detailed enough. They didn't "include a number of essential psychological attributes." In his work he proposed to extend the existing methods, and presented a new framework to make this possible.

=== Classification of social systems ===
Hanken (1981) argued that in the social systems can be classified in three main types:

- Autocratic systems
- Collective systems, and
- Democratic systems

This systems differ in ways of decision-making, social interaction, dominance relationship, principles of coordination, communication, bargaining, coalitions, etc.

The social system itself can be pictured with three types of subsystems:

- The system S
- The environment E, and
- The decision-maker D

Furthermore, these systems contain five essential variables: the control variables, the input variables, the state variables, the output variables, and the information variables.

=== Reception ===
In the sociocybernetics of the 1980s, it was an ongoing question what constitutes social systems. In his 1981 Cybernetics and Society, Hanken stated that social systems consists of actors, inline with Tom Baumgartner in his 1978 paper entitled "An actor-oriented systems model for the analysis of industrial democracy measures." Other scientists in those days defined the components of social systems simply as individuals, or communications.

In summarizing the different approaches in cybernetics on evaluation processes Levin-Rozalis (2010) stated that developments has led to "relativist and subjective perceptions of knowledge." Is this matter Hanken (1981) had shown that "two actors in the same system will not absorb the same information from sources either outside or inside the system, nor will they perceive or weight it in the same way."

== Selected publications ==
- Hanken, A. F. G., and H. A. Reuver. "Introduction to Systems Analysis (Inleiding tot de Systeemleer)." Stenfert Kroese, 1973.
- Hanken, Albert FG. Cybernetics and Society: An Analysis of Social Systems. Vol. 6. CRC Press, 1981.
- Hanken, Albert FG, and H. A. Reuver. Social systems and learning systems. M. Nijhoff, 1981, Vol. 4. Springer Science & Business Media, 2012.
- Hanken, Albert FG. Balanceren tussen Boeddha en Freud, Utrecht : Het Spectrum, 1994.
- Hanken, Albert FG. De mystiek ontsluierd, Budel : Damon, 2002.
- Hanken, Albert FG. Religie zonder god. Eburon Uitgeverij, 2007.
- Hanken, Albert FG. Mysticism without Mystery. Eloquent Books, 2010.

=== Articles, a selection ===
- Hanken, A. F. G., and B. G. F. Buijs. "Systems analysis and business models." Annals of Systems Research. Springer US, 1971. 9–16.
- Hanken, A. F. G., and J. C. Zadoks. "Kunst, kitsch of kunde: het vraagstuk van de integratie en de integriteit der wetenschappen." (1978).

== Patents ==
- Hanken, Albert FG. "Measuring system." U.S. Patent No. 3,044,297. 17 July 1962.
- Hanken, Albert FG. "Measuring system for determining the mass of a dielectric material utilizing a capacitive probe at two frequencies." U.S. Patent No. 3,155,900. 3 November 1964.
- Hanken, Albert FG. "Backscatter thickness measuring gauge utilizing different energy levels of bremsstrahlung and two ionization chambers." U.S. Patent No. 3,412,249. 19 November 1968.
- Hanken, Albert FG. "Multiple energy detection for mixture analysis." U.S. Patent No. 3,452,192. 24 June 1969.
