= HIDS =

HIDS may refer to:

- Host-based intrusion detection system, in computing
- Hyper-IgD syndrome, in medicine

== See also ==
- HID (disambiguation)
