= Jacques Thomassen =

Dutch organizational theorist

Jacques J.A. Thomassen (born 23 September 1945) is a Dutch organizational theorist, Emeritus Professor of Political Science at the University of Twente, and member of the Royal Netherlands Academy of Arts and Sciences, known for his work on the theory of political and policy representation.

== Biography ==
Born in Diessen, Thomassen obtained his MA in Sociology in 1968 at the Tilburg University, where in 1976 he also obtained his PhD in the Social Sciences.

In 1968 he started his academic career as assistant professor at the Tilburg University. After his graduation in 1977 he was appointed Professor of Political science at the University of Twente, where he served the rest of academic career. He was Dean of the faculty of Political science in the years 1985–87 and 1993–93. Over the years he has been Visiting Professor at the University of Michigan, Harvard University, Mannheim University, European University Institute and Australian National University.

In the years 1986–87 and 2002–03 he was fellow at the Netherlands Institute for Advanced Studies in the Social Sciences (NIAS). Since 1991 he is member of the Royal Netherlands Academy of Arts and Sciences.

His research interests include "Democratic theory, political representation, electoral research and legitimacy in the European Union."

== Selected publications ==
- Schmitt, Hermann, and Jacques Thomassen. Political representation and legitimacy in the European Union. Oxford University Press, 1999.
- Kickert, Walter JM, and Jacques JA Thomassen. Governance in modern society: Effects, change and formation of government institutions. Kluwer Academic Publishers, 2000.
- Thomassen, Jacques JA. The European voter. A comparative study of modern democracies. Oxford University Press, 2005.

Articles, a selection:

- Thomassen, Jacques, and Hermann Schmitt. "Policy representation." European Journal of Political Research 32.2 (1997): 165–184.
