= Systems-oriented design =

Principle in design thinking

Systems-oriented design (SOD) uses system thinking in order to capture the complexity of systems addressed in design practice. The main mission of SOD is to build the designers' own interpretation and implementation of systems thinking. SOD aims at enabling systems thinking to fully benefit from design thinking and practice and design thinking and practice to fully benefit from systems thinking. SOD addresses design for human activity systems and can be applied to any kind of design problem ranging from product design and interaction design through architecture to decision-making processes and policy design.

SOD is a variation in the pluralistic field of Systemic Design. It is one of the most practical and design-oriented versions of relating and merging systems thinking and design.

== Background ==
Design is getting more and more complex for several reasons, for example, due to globalisation, need for sustainability, and the introduction of new technology and increased use of automation. Many of the challenges designers meet today can be considered wicked problems. The characteristics of a wicked problem include that there is no definitive formulation of the problem and that the solutions are never true or false but rather better or worse. A traditional problem-solving approach is not sufficient in addressing for such design problems. SOD is an approach that addresses the challenges the designer faces when working with complex systems and wicked problems, providing tools and techniques which make it easier for the designer to grasp the complexity of the problem at hand. With a systems-oriented approach towards design, the designer acknowledges that the starting point for the design process is constantly moving and that "every implemented solution is consequential. It leaves "traces" that cannot be undone." (see Rittel and Webber's 5th property of wicked problems).

Designers are well suited to work with complexity and wicked problems for several reasons:

- They are trained and experienced in creative thinking and idea generation;
- They know how to synthesise solutions from complex and fuzzy material;
- Designers can visualise, which is an enormous advantage for understanding and communicating complexity.

SOD emphasises these abilities as central and seeks to further train the designer in systems thinking and systems practice as a skill and an art.

== History ==
SOD was developed and defined over time by Birger Ragnvald Sevaldson and colleagues at the Oslo School of Architecture and Design (AHO). Though there were earlier traces, it started in 2006 with a studio course for master students called "The Challenge of Complexity" " named after a conference in Finland in the early 1990s.

The initiative was purely design-driven, and it implied using large graphic maps as visual thinking tools and embracing very complex visualisations of systems. These were around 2008, dubbed "Gigamaps" by Sevaldson. In 2012, Sevaldson organised a seminar called "Relating Systems Thinking and Design" (RSD). A group from the international design community was invited and presented at the seminar.

After the seminar, this group got together in the loft of the Savoy hotel and there founded the informal network that later was called Systemic Design Research Network.

RSD developed into an annual conference with the first three conferences at AHO. In 2013, The emerging new movement of systems thinking in design shifted from being called Systems Oriented Design to Systemic Design. Sevaldson initiated this change to, on the one hand, maintain the development of SOD into a designerly approach while, on the other hand, allowing the bigger field to grow pluralistically into different variations. Harold Nelson suggested the name Systemic Design.

This allowed SOD to develop into a more designerly way where practice and praxeology became ever more important. Parallel to this, SOD was clarifying its theoretical bases by relating to diverse historical systems theories but, most importantly, to Soft Systems and Critical Systems Thinking. Especially Gerald Midgley became important. Also the crystallisation of SOD developed through the publication of the book mentioned above in 2022.

Through the years, the collaboration with Andreas Wettre, a business consultant, becoming a full-time employee at AHO has been crucial. He brought in organisational perspectives amongst others Stacey

== Influences ==
Systems-oriented design builds on systems theory and systems thinking to develop practices for addressing complexity in design. There are many of the classical first and second-wave systems theorists that have been influential that won't be mentioned here. Soft systems methodology (SSM) was influential, acknowledging conflicting worldviews and people's purposeful actions, and a systems view on creativity. However, more important, SOD is inspired by critical systems thinking and approaches systems theories in an eclectic way transforming the thoughts of the different theories to fit the design process. The design disciplines build on their own traditions and have a certain way of working with problems, often referred to as design thinking (Note: The definition of design thinking is not completely agreed upon and the term is used somewhat differently by different people. There is currently considerable academic and business interest in developing further understanding of what design thinking is.) or the design way. Design thinking is a creative process based on the "building up" of ideas. This style of thinking is one of the advantages of the designer and is the reason why simply employing one of the existing systems approaches into design, like, for example, systems engineering, is not found sufficient by the advocates of SOD.

Compared with other systems approaches, SOD is less concerned with hierarchies and borders of systems, modelling and feedback loops, and more focused on the whole fields of relations and patterns of interactions. S.O.D. seeks richness rather than simplification of the complex systems.

== Systems thinking in the design process ==
Methods and techniques from other disciplines are used to understand the complexity of the system, including for example, ethnographic studies, risk analysis, and scenario thinking. Methods and concepts unique to SOD include, for example, the Rich Design Space, Gigamapping, and Incubation Techniques.

Incubation is one of the 4 proposed stages of creativity: preparation, incubation, illumination, and verification.

== Further development and applications ==
The concept of systems-oriented design was initially proposed by professor Birger Sevaldson at the Oslo School of Architecture and Design (AHO) . The SOD approach is currently under development through teaching and research projects, as well as through the work of design practitioners. AHO provides Master courses in Systems Oriented Design each term as part of their Industrial Design program. In these courses, design students are trained in using the tools and techniques of SOD in projects with outside partners. Research projects in systems-oriented design are carried out at the Centre for Design Research at AHO in order to develop the concept, methods and tools further. In 2016 the project Systemic Approach to Architectural Performance was announced as an institutional cooperation between the Faculty of Art and Architecture at the Technical University of Liberec and the Oslo School of Architecture and Design. Its mission is to link the methodology of systems-oriented design with performance-oriented architecture on the case study Marie Davidova's project Wood as a Primary Medium to Architectural Performance.

== See also ==
- Creative problem solving process
- Creativity techniques
- Systems thinking
