= International Federation for Systems Research =

International federation for global and local societies

The International Federation for Systems Research (IFSR) is an international federation for global and local societies in the field of systems science and cybernetics. This federation is a non-profit, scientific and educational agency founded in 1980, and constituted of more than thirty member organizations around the globe.

== Organisation ==
The overall purpose of the Federation is to advance cybernetic and systems research and systems applications and to serve the international systems community as a peakbody. For this purpose the federation wants to coordinate systems research among member organizations. They are focused on the organization and sponsorship of research and development, international meetings and workshops in the field. More specifically, the federation wants to develop and promote international programs and publications in the area of systems research and applications.

Other tasks include the development and promotion of:

- Resource materials development in systems education;
- Standards of competence in systems research and systems education;
- A knowledge base in the cybernetic and systems sciences;

For its member organizations the federation seeks coordinating programs and provides assistance to them.

The IFSR was founded on 12 March 1980 by the American Society for General Systems Research (now ISSS), the Austrian Society for Cybernetic Studies, and the Dutch Systems Group with George Klir as first president of the IFSR.

The International Academy for Systems and Cybernetic Sciences (IASCYS) was founded 2010 by the International Federation for Systems Research, later becoming independent and then being dissolved in 2026.

=== Member organizations ===
The IFSR is a member organizations of over thirty systems science organizations worldwide:

- American Society for Cybernetics (ASC) (website), USA
- Association Française des Sciences et Technologies de l'Information et des Systèmes / Association Française de Science des Systèmes, France
- AR+, USA
- Analytics Society of Ireland, Ireland
- Applied Systems Thinking in Practice (ASTiP) by the Open University (OU), UK
- Australia and New Zealand Systems Group (ANZSYS)
- Bertalanffy Center for the Study of Systems Science, Austria
- Business Systems Laboratory, Italy
- Cybernetics Society (website), London, UK
- Deutsche Gesellschaft fuer Kybernetik, Germany
- Dutch Systems Group, The Netherlands
- European School of Governance, Germany
- European Union for Systemics – Union européenne de systémique (EUS-UES), EU
- Forum of the Future/School of Systems Change, UK
- Gesellschaft für Wirtschafts- und Sozialkybernetik, Germany
- Hai Phong Systems Science Society (HPSSS), Vietnam
- Hellenic Society for Systemic Studies (HSSS), Greece
- International Council on Systems Engineering (INCOSE) (website)
- International Research Institute for Advanced Systems, Russia
- International Society for Knowledge and Systems Sciences, China
- International Society for the Systems Sciences (ISSS) (website), USA
- International Sociological Association, Research Committee 51 on Sociocybernetics, Spain
- Malik Management Institute, Switzerland
- Österreichische Studiengesellschaft für Kybernetik / Austrian Society for Cybernetic Studies, Austria
- SCiO Systems and Complexity in Organisation, UK
- System Dynamics Society (SDS) (website), USA
- Systems Engineering Society of China / Academy of Mathematics and Systems Science, China
- Sociedad Española de Sistemas Generales, Spain
- Slovenian Society for Systems Research, Slovenia
- Systemic Design Association (website), Canada and Norway
- The Oroborus Foundation, Switzerland
- Laboratoire Théorie des systèmes en architecture (tsa-lab), Belgium
- UK Systems Society, UK
- WCSA - World Complexity Science Academy, Italy

=== Journal, book series, and newsletter ===
- Systems Research and Behavioral Science

The IFSR Journal of Systems Research was established in 1984 but was merged with the International Society for the Systems Sciences's Journal of Behavioural Science in 1997, forming the Journal of Systems Research and Behavioural Science. The Journal aims to stimulate disciplined inquiry and provides transdisciplinary focus for the exchange of ideas and knowledge; relating to the analysis, design, development, and management of systems and programs. The journal (ISSN 1092-7026), is edited by Michael C. Jackson and is published six times a year.

- International Series on Systems Science and Engineering

This IFSR Book Series provides a publication avenue for high quality systems literature. George Mobus (University of Washington at Tacoma) is the current Editor-in-Chief (see Editor-in-Chief and Editorial Board) of the book series. Until 2016, George Klir (State University New York City, Springer Publishing) was the editor. At the time, the editorial board for the IFSR International book series included:

- Gerrit Broekstra, Nyenrode University, The Netherlands Business School, Netherlands
- John L. Casti, Santa Fe Institute, NM, USA
- Brian R. Gaines, Dept. of Computer Science, University of Calgary, Calgary, Alberta, Canada
- Ivan M. Havel, Center for Theoretical Study, Charles University, Czech Republic
- Klaus Kornwachs, Brandenburgische Technische Universität Cottbus, Germany
- Franz Pichler, Institute of Systems Science, Johannes Kepler University of Linz, Austria

- IFSR Newsletter

The IFSR Newsletter is the informal newsletter of the IFSR (hard copy: ISSN 1818-0809, online: ISSN 1818-0817), published once or twice a year since 1981, edited by Paul F de. P. Hanika (1981–1985), Robert Trappl (1985), Steven Sokoloff (1986 – 1994), Gerhard Chroust (1993–2018) and Louis Klein (2019-present). The newsletter informs member societies about new academic work, updates on fellow member societies and prominent scientists, updates on past systems conferences and plans for future conferences. Back issues of newsletters are available on the IFSR.org web site.

=== IFSR Conversations ===
The Conversations, initially held in Fuschl near Salzburg, Austria, were established by the IFSR in 1980 and are held biennially. The Conversations convene approximately 30 - 40 systems scientists from around the world to discuss systemic issues and develop understanding relevant for society and its environment. The last IFSR Conversation was held in 2016 in St. Magdalena, Linz, Austria. Work is currently underway, post pandemic, in planning alternative formats IFSR Conversation.

The Conversations were established primarily under the guidance of Bela H. Banathy, as an alternative to traditional conferences. A number of systems professionals found that they were disillusioned with a format in which the majority of the time was spent on papers being read or presented to passive listeners, with minimal time for discussion and interaction about the ideas. As described by Bela, they were to be:

- a collectively guided disciplined inquiry,
- an exploration of issues of social/societal significance,
- engaged by scholarly practitioners in self-organized teams,
- on a theme for their conversation selected by participants,
- initiated in the course of a preparation phase that leads to an intensive learning phase.

"Conversations were introduced by Bela H. Banathy around 1980 as an alternative to the classical conferences which usually consist only of presentation of streamlined papers and short question slots. In a Conversation a small group of systems scientists and practitioners meets for several days to discuss in a self-guided way a topic of scientific and social importance. A Conversations is preceded by an intensive off-line preparation phase (including exchanges of ‘input papers’), followed by the face-to-face discussion at the Conversation and followed by a post-conversation consolidation period. No papers are presented during the conversation, the participants discuss face-to-face their topic, often modifying it in the course of the conversation."

The results of the conference are published in the Proceedings of the IFSR Conversations. This document publishes the team reports plus several contributed papers. A short description of the IFSR's activities completes the proceedings. The Proceedings are distributed to member societies and conference attendees. The 2012 Proceedings are available at: The Proceedings of the IFSR Conversation 2012, St. Magdalena, Linz. The 2014 Proceedings are available at:. The 2016 Proceedings are available through print-on-demand at 2016 IFSR Conversation Proceedings: Systems Literacy. Proceedings prior to 2012 are available online in the Archives section of the IFSR website (see https://www.ifsr.org/index.php/publications/conversations/).

The Conversations have led to significant development of a theoretical basis for Systems Engineering, progress in the evolution of Cybernetics to Second Order Science, continuing elucidation of GST* (General Systems Theory), and informing Systems Research (https://www.springer.com/us/book/9789811002625). These developments are described in the IFSR Newsletter.

=== Past presidents ===
More prominent system scientists have been officers of the IFSR since 1980. Presidents of the federation were:

- 1980: George J. Klir
- 1984: Robert Trappl
- 1988: Gerrit Broekstra
- 1992: Gerard de Zeeuw
- 1994: Bela H. Banathy
- 1998: Michael C. Jackson
- 2000: Yong Pil Rhee
- 2002: Jifa Gu
- 2006 Matjaz Mulej
- 2008 Matjaz Mulej
- 2010 Gary S. Metcalf
- 2012 Gary S. Metcalf
- 2014 Gary S. Metcalf
- 2016 Mary C. Edson
- 2018 Ray Ison
- 2026 Nora Bateson

=== IFSR 2024-2026 Executive Committee ===
- Ray Ison, President
- Louis Klein, Secretary General
- Pamela Buckle, Vice President
- Rika Preiser, Vice President
- Nam Nguyen, Vice President
- Philippe Vandenbroeck, Vice President

=== International Academy for Systems and Cybernetic Sciences ===
On April 7, 2010 the General Assembly of the IFSR approved the founding of the International Academy for Systems and Cybernetic Sciences (IASCYS).

- Aims

IASCYS aims to honor and activate outstanding members of IFSR member-associations. While no one can apply for membership in IASCYS as an individual, every member association of the IFSR can suggest candidates in an official letter supplying data on the candidate's scientific and professional achievements in accordance with the criteria of the IASCYS.

- Motivations

IASCYS fills the gap resulting from the failure of national and international academies of sciences and arts to include systems and cybernetics in their list of sciences and arts.

- Intentions

In order to honor the most distinguished systems and cybernetics professionals and simultaneously to promote the systems thinking world view, each year during a ceremonial assembly, a selected academic receives the Bertalanffy/Wiener medal of the Academy.

The IASCYS was dissolved in 2026.

== See also ==
- List of systems science organizations
- Charles François
