= Walter Kickert =

Dutch academic

Walter Julius Michael Kickert (born 1950) is a Dutch academic, and Professor of Public Management at the department of Public Administration, Erasmus University Rotterdam, known for his work on "Public policy and administration sciences in the Netherlands."

== Biography ==
Kickert obtained his MA in experimental physics from the University of Utrecht, and his PhD from the Eindhoven University of Technology in 1980 under supervision of Albert Hanken with the thesis, entitled "Organisation of Decision-Making."

After his graduation in Utrecht, Kickert had started his academic career as research assistant at the Queen Mary College, London University in the mid 1970s. There he worked in the field of fuzzy set theory, and published his first book entitled "Fuzzy Theories on Decision-Making." After his graduation in Eindhoven he was appointed lecturer at the Radboud University Nijmegen. From 1984 to 1990 he worked for the Dutch government in the ministry of Education and Sciences. In 1990 he moved back to the academic world to the Erasmus University Rotterdam, where he was appointed Professor of public management. He was scientific director of the Netherlands Institute of Government, an inter-university research school, from 2006 to 2013. He retired in 2015.

== Selected publications ==
- Kickert, Walter Julius Michael, and Frans van Vught, eds. Public policy and administration sciences in the Netherlands. Prentice Hall, 1995.
- Kickert, Walter JM, Erik-Hans Klijn, and Johannes Franciscus Maria Koppenjan, eds. Managing complex networks: strategies for the public sector. Sage, 1997.
- Kickert, Walter Julius Michael, and Richard Joseph Stillman, eds. The modern state and its study: New administrative sciences in a changing Europe and United States. Edward Elgar Pub, 1999.
- Kickert, Walter JM, and Jacques JA Thomassen. Governance in modern society: Effects, change and formation of government institutions. Kluwer Academic Publishers, 2000.
- Kickert, Walter Julius Michael. Public management reforms in the Netherlands: Social reconstruction of reform ideas and underlying frames of reference. Eburon, 2000.
- Kickert, Walter Julius Michael. The history of governance in the Netherlands: continuity and exceptions. Elsevier Overheid, 2004.

Articles, a selection

- Kickert, Walter JM, and Henk Koppelaar. "Application of fuzzy set theory to syntactic pattern recognition of handwritten capitals." IEEE Transactions on Systems, Man, and Cybernetics 2 (1976): 148-151.
- Kickert, Walter JM. "Public Governance in the Netherlands: An Alternative to Anglo‐American ‘Managerialism’." Public administration 75.4 (1997): 731–752.

== See also ==
- Policy network analysis
