= European Journal of Information Systems =

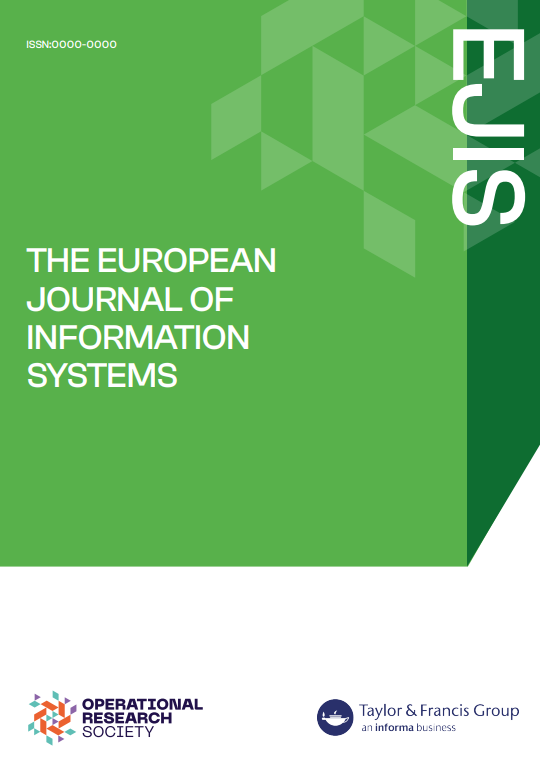
- Discipline: Information systems management
- Language: English
- Edited by: Kieran Conboy, Virpi Tuunainen

Publication details
- History: 1991-present
- Publisher: Taylor & Francis
- Frequency: Bimonthly
- Impact factor: 7.3 (2023)

Standard abbreviations
- ISO 4: Eur. J. Inf. Syst.

Indexing
- ISSN: 0960-085X

Links
- Journal homepage; Online access

The European Journal of Information Systems is a bimonthly peer-reviewed scientific journal covering the theory and practice of information systems. It was established in 1991 and is an official journal of the Operational Research Society. The journal covers a diverse range of topics including technology, development, implementation, strategy, management, and policy related to the theory and practice of information systems.

According to the Journal Citation Reports, the journal has a 2023 impact factor of 7.3.

== See also ==
- List of systems science journals
