= Dutch Systems Group =

Dutch professional organization

Dutch Systems Group (SGN)
- Founded: 1970
- Type: Professional Organization
- Purpose: Systems sciences
- Location: Amsterdam, The Netherlands
- Method: Systemica: Journal of the Dutch Systems Group
- Key people: Loet Leydesdorff (former president)
- Website: homepage

The Dutch Systems Group, or Netherlands Society for Systems Research or Systeemgroep Nederland, is a society in the Netherlands for systems theory, and its applications. Systems theoretical problems the society focuses on are, for example evolution, innovation, selection, variation, translation, participation and methodological innovation.

== Overview ==
The Dutch Systems Group was initiated by Albert Hanken and Gerard de Zeeuw and others in 1970. The activities of the Dutch Systems Group, according to de Zeeuw (2006), made an important contribution to the introduction of the area of systems studies in the Netherlands. Other early participant have been Felix Geyer, Henk Koppelaar, Ton de Leeuw and Geert Jan Olsder.

In the beginning of the 1980s the Dutch Systems Group cofounded the International Federation for Systems Research together with the international American based Society for General Systems Research and the Austrian Society for Cybernetic Studies.

During the 1970s the Dutch Systems Group published the refereed journal Systemica, edited by Ranulph Glanville and Gerard de Zeeuw.

Since the 1980s the Dutch systems group has held more than 18 conferences on systems science in Amsterdam. Together with the IFSR they organised biannual International Conferences.

The last president was Loet Leydesdorff, and previous presidents were Gerrit Broekstra for eight years and Gerard de Zeeuw.

== Annals of Systems Research ==
From 1971 until 1978 the Dutch Systems Group published the Annals of Systems Research. This journal published "original papers in the field of general systems research, both of a mathematical and non-mathematical nature. Research reports on special subjects which are of importance for the general development of systems research activity as a whole are acceptable for publication". The journal was edited by Bob van Rootselaar.
