= Interdisciplinary Description of Complex Systems =

Interdisciplinary Description of Complex Systems (INDECS) is a peer-reviewed scientific journal on complex systems, published in Zagreb, Croatia. It is published by a non-governmental organization, the society znanost.org.

== See also ==
- Croatian Interdisciplinary Society
