= GTRI Aerospace, Transportation and Advanced Systems Laboratory =

Aerospace, Transportation and Advanced Systems Laboratory
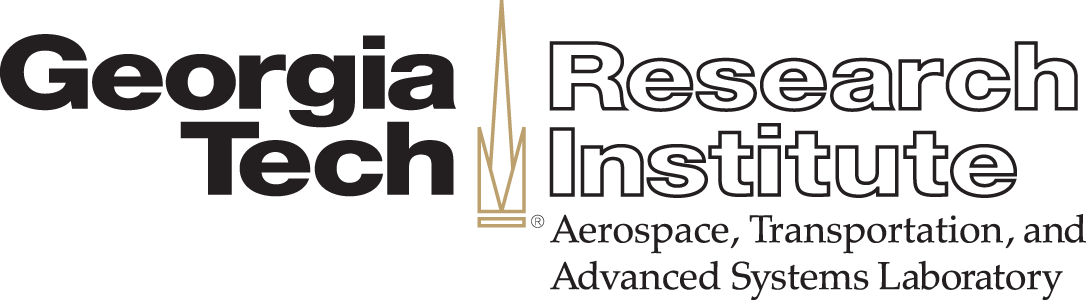
- Company type: Nonprofit
- Industry: Aerospace systems, power and energy systems, threat systems
- Headquarters: Atlanta, Georgia, USA
- Key people: Rusty Roberts; Laboratory Director
- Parent: Georgia Tech Research Institute
- Website: www.gtri.gatech.edu/atas

The Aerospace, Transportation and Advanced Systems Laboratory (ATAS) is one of eight labs in the Georgia Tech Research Institute and one of three labs under the Sensors and Intelligent Systems directorate. ATAS develops advanced systems concepts and performs research related to aerospace systems, power and energy systems, threat systems, intelligent autonomous systems, and systems engineering methodologies. The lab also develops advanced technologies and performs research in a range of areas relevant to aerospace and ground transportation as well as to national defense.

== Research areas ==
Current contracts include work in aerodynamics and flow control, aeroacoustics, computational aeroelasticity, wind tunnel testing, aircraft structural analysis, rotorcraft, intelligent systems, fuel cell and battery technologies, smart small scale projectiles, embedded computing, unmanned aerial vehicles, and flight stability and control.

The lab also performs applied research and development of radar-related technologies in support of national defense preparedness. The lab's prototype development capabilities span the spectrum from mechanical and electronics design and fabrication to full system integration including embedded computing and control systems. ATAS has also achieved a national reputation for its expertise in threat systems, advanced transmitter technology, radar system development, and weapon systems interpretation.

Within ATAS, the Food Processing Technology Division's (FPTD) Agricultural Technology Research Program (ATRP) conducts significant research in improving the production and quality of food while minimizing the environmental impacts of the industry. This program is designed to enhance the productivity of Georgia's agribusiness and the competitiveness of Georgia's food processing, applying computer vision, robotics, plant ergonomics, biosensors, and wearable computer technology.

== Location ==
The ATAS main research facility is located at the Cobb County Research Facility in Smyrna, Georgia.
