= Henk Koppelaar =

Dutch computer scientist (born 1953)

- Born: Hendrik Koppelaar; February 1953
- Education: Utrecht University; University of Amsterdam; Delft University of Technology
- Known for: "Application of fuzzy set theory to syntactic pattern recognition of handwritten capitals" (1976)
- Scientific career
- Fields: Knowledge engineering
- Workplaces: University of Amsterdam; Delft University of Technology

Hendrik (Henk) Koppelaar (born February 1953) is a Dutch computer scientist and emeritus professor at the Delft University of Technology, knows for his work in knowledge engineering.

Koppelaar started his studies at the Utrecht University in 1971, where he graduated in Physics in 1976. In 1981 he started his graduate study at the University of Amsterdam, where he obtained his PhD in Computer and Information Sciences and Support Services in 1984. Under supervision of Gideon J. Mellenbergh and J.K. de Vree (1938-2017) he wrote his thesis on the theory and new ways of data processing in modeling in the social sciences.

Koppelaar was appointed Professor at the University of Amsterdam in 1986. In 1986 he moved to Delft University of Technology, where he served as Professor of the Computer Science until 2004. In 1986 he was founder of the Dutch Artificial Intelligence Association, which merged into the Belgian Dutch Artificial Intelligence Association in 1988. In the 1970s he had joined the Dutch Systems Group, where he served as editor of its newsletter from 1973 to 1988.

Early research of Koppelaar focussed on automatic recognition of handprinted characters, where they had developed a method of syntactic pattern recognition using fuzzy set theory. Their research had focussed on handwritten capitals. Later in the 1980s his research had focussed the application of chaos theory in the social science. In 1994 he published a methodological analysis of these applications.

== Selected publications ==
- Koppelaar, Henk. Twee nieuwe wegen voor modelbouw in de sociale wetenschappen: theorie- en dataverwerking. PhD thesis, University of Amsterdam, 1986.

Articles, a selection

- Kickert, Walter JM, and Henk Koppelaar. "Application of fuzzy set theory to syntactic pattern recognition of handwritten capitals." IEEE Transactions on Systems, Man, and Cybernetics 2 (1976): 148–151.
- Faber, Jan, and Henk Koppelaar. "Chaos theory and social science: a methodological analysis." Quality and Quantity 28.4 (1994): 421–433.
