= Systemic Design Association =

Scholarly association based in Norway

- Abbreviation: SDA
- Formation: October 23, 2018
- Type: Non-profit scholarly association
- Purpose: Research and practice of design for complex systems
- Headquarters: Tønsberg, Norway
- Region served: International
- Official language: English
- Website: systemic-design.org

The Systemic Design Association (SDA) is a non-profit scholarly association that leads research and practice in design for complex systems. Founded on October 23, 2018, and registered with the Brønnøysund Register Centre in Norway, the organization serves as an international hub for systemic design scholarship and practice.

== History ==
The association emerged from the Relating Systems Thinking and Design (RSD) symposia. The first RSD symposium was held in 2012 as a graduate seminar at the Oslo School of Architecture and Design (AHO), organized by Birger Sevaldson to explore relationships between systems thinking, design thinking, and design practice.

Between 2012 and 2018, the organization operated as the Systemic Design Research Network (SDRN), a cooperative research group between AHO and OCAD University. The network was organized by Birger Sevaldson, Harold G. Nelson, Peter Jones, and Alex Ryan to advance systemic design as an integrated design discipline. In October 2018, at RSD7 held at Politecnico di Torino, the organization was formally incorporated as the Systemic Design Association, with Silvia Barbero and Jodi Forlizzi forming a standing committee.

The SDA is recognized as a systems society of the International Federation for Systems Research.

== Activities ==
=== RSD Symposium ===
The annual Relating Systems Thinking and Design (RSD) symposium serves as the association's flagship event. Since RSD2 in 2013, proceedings have been documented and published as a foundation for research and inquiry in the discipline.

RSD proceedings are published annually (ISSN 2371-8404) and serve as a searchable repository of peer-reviewed work in systemic design, with over 1,500 articles catalogued. The symposium employs a "Scholars Spiral" publishing model—a cyclic, non-hierarchical approach to advancing scholarship that reduces competitive hierarchies and encourages developing authors in the field.

=== Publications ===
In 2022, the SDA launched Contexts—The Systemic Design Journal, a peer-reviewed open-access academic journal covering research in systemic design. Peter Jones serves as editor-in-chief. The journal follows a continuous publishing model and publishes articles in HTML and PDF formats.

RSD proceedings have also contributed to special issues in other design journals including FORMakademisk and She Ji: The Journal of Design, Economics, and Innovation, as well as edited volumes in the Springer Systems Science series.

== See also ==
- Design methods
