= Johan de Vree =

Dutch political scientist

- Born: Johan Karel de Vree; April 16, 1938; Borgharen
- Died: May 28, 2017
- Education: University of Amsterdam
- Scientific career
- Fields: Political science
- Workplaces: Utrecht University
- Thesis: Studies on educational tests (1971)
- Doctoral advisor: Hans Daudt
- Doctoral students: Henk Koppelaar

Johan Karel de Vree (April 16, 1938 – May 28, 2017) was a Dutch political scientist, and professor of Theory of International Relations at Utrecht University, known for his "scientists" approach to political science.

== Biography ==
De Vree started the Geodesy study in 1959 at the Delft University of Technology. The next year in 1960 he moved to the University of Amsterdam, where he obtained his MA in political and social sciences in 1967. He continued his graduate study and obtained his PhD in 1972 under Hans Daudt with the thesis Political integration: the formation of theory and its problems.

After his graduation in 1967 De Vree started his academic career as lecturer at the Europa Institute of the University of Amsterdam. In 1973 he was appointed Professor Theory of International Relations at the Utrecht University, where he retired in 1999. De Vree was na active member of the Dutch Political Science Association, where he was president from 1975 to 1983. He was also a member of the American Association for the Advancement of Science and of the New York Academy of Sciences.

De Vree is particularly known for the comprehensive formal theory of human behavior, that he had built on throughout his career. He felt related to the theoretical physicists, who strived for a theory of everything. He is looking for the systems that underlay human behavior. This approach he thought would eventually lead to "a kind of socio-political weather forecast".

== Selected publications ==
- De Vree, Johan K. Political integration: the formation of theory and its problems, PhD thesis University of Amsterdam, 1967.
- De Vree, Johan K. Het stervensuur van Leviathan? Beschouwingen over de ontwikkeling van staat en internationale samenleving. Inaugural lecture Utrecht University, 1973.
- De Vree, Johan K. Foundations of social and political processes: the dynamics of human behavior, politics and society. Bilthoven : Prime Press, 1982.
- De Vree, Johan K. Order and disorder in the human universe: the foundations of behavioral and social science. 3 Volumes. Bilthoven : Prime Press, 1990. was published.

Articles, a selection

- De Vree, Johan K. "The behavioral function: An inquiry into the relation between behavior and utility." Theory and Decision 15.3 (1983): 231–245.
- De Vree, Johan K., and Johan C. Dagevos. "The structure of action and interaction: The structural similarity of systems in social science." Journal of Mathematical Sociology 19.2 (1994): 91–127.
- De Vree, Johan K. "A note on information, order, stability and adaptability." BioSystems 38.2-3 (1996): 221–227.

About his work

- Dagevos, J.C., Towards a model of social interaction : on the dynamics of science, power, and dependence. PhD thesis Utrecht University, Bilthoven : Prime Press, 1994.
