= Ton de Leeuw (organizational theorist) =

Dutch organizational theorist

Antonius Cornelis Joannes (Ton) de Leeuw (born 10 September 1941) is a Dutch organizational theorist and Emeritus professor of business administration at the University of Groningen, known for his contributions in the field of systems theory and methodology applied to business administration, management and innovation.

== Biography ==
Born in Eindhoven, De Leeuw started to study electrical engineering at the Eindhoven University of Technology in 1962, and received his Msc in Electrical Engineering in 1968. Six years later, in 1974 in Eindhoven he also received his PhD under Henk Feitsma and Albert Hanken, with the thesis entitled "Systeemleer en organisatiekunde" (System engineering and organizational studies).

De Leeuw started his academic career in 1974 as Assistant Professor at the department of Business Administration at the Technical University of Eindhoven, which was chaired by Bert Hulshof. In 1979 De Leeuw was appointed Professor of Business Administration at the University of Groningen next to Professor Maarten van Gils. Together they founded and developed the study of Business Administration at the University of Groningen. From 1983 to 1990 De Leeuw was also dean of the faculty. In 2006 De Leeuw retired, and was awarded a Knight in the Order of the Netherlands Lion for his work as organizational theorist.

Among his PhD students were Dirk Pieter van Donk, Nic J.T.A Kramer, Rubya Maduro, Bartjan Pennink, Henk W. Volberda, and Jan-Peter Vos.

== Work ==
De Leeuw's research interests are in the fields of organizational theory, managerial methodology, management of change processes, and strategy in professional organizations. In these fields De Leeuw has developed fundamental and practical tools based on principles of system theory and control theory.

== Selected publications ==
- de Leeuw, Antonius Cornelis Joannes. Systeemleer en organisatiekunde. Diss. 1974.
- Leeuw, Antonius Cornelis Joannes. Organisaties: management, analyse, ontwerp en verandering: een systeemvisie. Van Gorcum, 1986.
- Leeuw, Antonius Cornelis Joannes. Bedrijfskundige methodologie. Uitgeverij Van Gorcum, 1996.
- De Leeuw, A. C. J. Bedrijfskundig management. Uitgeverij Van Gorcum, 2000.

Articles, a selection

- De Leeuw, A. C. J. "The control paradigm is an aid for understanding and designing organizations." Third European Meeting on Cybernetics and Systems Research, Vienna. 1976.
- De Leeuw, Antonius CJ, and Henk W. Volberda. "On the concept of flexibility: a dual control perspective." Omega 24.2 (1996): 121–139.
- Omta, S. W. F., and A. C. J. De Leeuw. "Management control, uncertainty, and performance in biomedical research in universities, institutes and companies." Journal of Engineering and Technology Management 14.3-4 (1997): 223–257.
