= Hard systems =

Hard systems is a problem-solving approach in systems science. It can be contrasted with soft systems, for which systems thinking must handle many ill-defined, or not easily quantified elements.

Hard systems approaches such as systems analysis (structured methods), operations research and so on, assume that the problems associated with such systems are well-defined and likely to have a single, optimum solution, so a problem-solving approach will work well as technical factors tend to predominate.

== Developments in hard systems thinking ==
Hard systems began to emerge as a distinct philosophy in the 1950s.

== See also ==
- Systems engineering
- Systems analysis
- Systems dynamics
