= Croatian Interdisciplinary Society =

Croatian Interdisciplinary Society (Croatian: Hrvatsko interdisciplinarno društvo, abbrev. HID) is a non-governmental organization operating in Croatia. It acts to promote interdisciplinary education and research, primarily but not exclusively in the domain of complex systems. They are a member society of the International Federation for Systems Research.

== Activities ==
- INDECS, a peer-reviewed scientific journal
- DECOS, Describing Complex Systems, an academic conference
- AtoS, a seminar for students
- Sustavi, a popular science magazine
