= Robert Trappl =

Austrian scientist

Robert Trappl 2016

Robert Trappl (born 16 January 1939, in Vienna) is an Austrian scientist and head of the Austrian Research Institute for Artificial Intelligence in Vienna, which was founded in 1984. He is known for his work in the field of cybernetics and artificial intelligence.

== Biography ==
In the 1960s, Trappl received in Vienna a degree in electrical engineering, a degree in sociology from the Institute of Advanced Studies (Vienna), and a PhD in psychology, with a minor in astronomy.

Since the 1970s, Trappl has been working at the Medical University of Vienna, Austria. Since the 1980s he has been the director of the Austrian Research Institute for Artificial Intelligence and later until 2006 he also was head of the Institute of Medical Cybernetics and Artificial Intelligence at the Medical University of Vienna. Besides his work at the university he has advised several national and international companies and organizations.

In the 1970s, Trappl was President of the Austrian Society for Cybernetic Studies. In this position, he co-founded in 1980 the International Federation for Systems Research of which he became vice-president and from 1986 to 1988 president.

Trappl is also editor-in-chief of the scientific journals Applied Artificial Intelligence and Cybernetics and Systems, and a member of the editorial boards of several other journals.

== Publications ==
Trappl has published over 180 articles and cooperated in some 34 books. A selection:

- 1992. Advanced Topics in Artificial Intelligence, Heidelberg/New York: Springer.
- 1997. Creating Personalities for Synthetic Actors, Heidelberg/New York: Springer.
- 2001. (eds)Multi-Agent Systems and Applications, Heidelberg/New York: Springer.
- 2003. Emotions in Humans and Artifacts, MIT Press.
- 2004. Agent Culture. Human-Agent Interaction in a Multicultural World, Lawrence Erlbaum.
- 2005. Wissenschaft und Medizin, 3rd ed., Vienna: Facultas.
- 2006. Cybernetics and Systems 2006, 2 vols. Vienna: ASCS.
- 2006. Programming for Peace: Computer-Aided Methods for International Conflict Resolution and Prevention, Dordrecht, NL: Springer, .
