= Ray Ison =

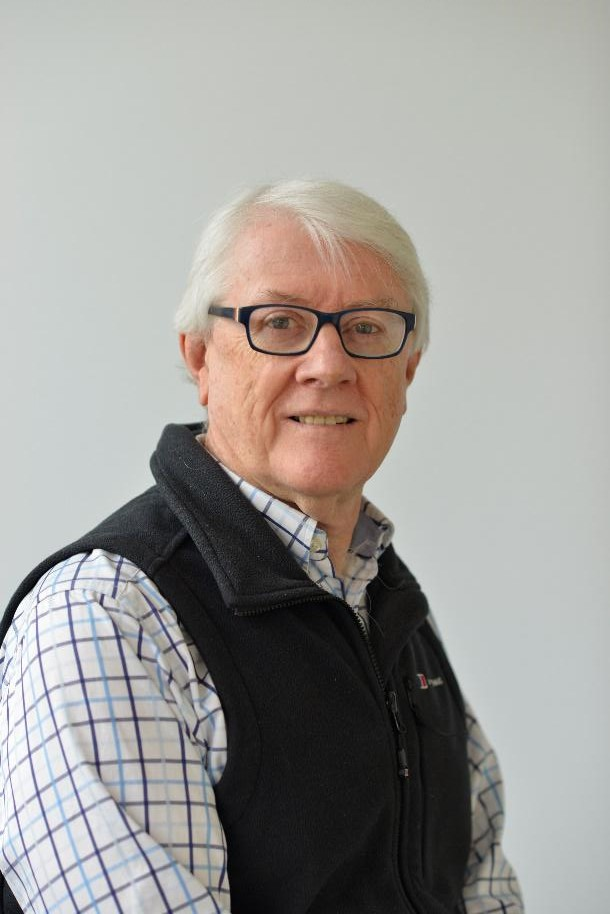

Raymond L. (Ray) Ison (born July 2, 1953 (age 73)) is an Australian environmental scientist, and Professor of Systems at the Open University in the UK. He was also Professor Systems for Sustainability at Monash University, and fellow at the Centre for Policy Development, and President of the International Society for the Systems Sciences in the year 2014-15. He is known for his work on rural development and sustainable management.

== Life and work ==
After attending the Bathurst High School in Bathurst, New South Wales from 1965 to 1970, Ison received his BSc in Agricultural Science from the University of Sydney in 1974, and his PhD in Plant Ecophysiology from the University of Queensland in 1981.

Ison started his academic career as Lecturer at the University of Western Sydney in 1982. In 1986 he moved to the University of Sydney, where he was appointed Senior Lecturer in the School of Crop Sciences. In 1994 he moved to the UK and was appointed Professor of Systems at the Open University, where he contributed to the ″Masters in Systems Thinking in Practice″ program. From 2008 to 2016 he was also at Monash University in its Monash Sustainability Institute.

From 2008 to 2012 Ison co-directed the Sustainable Development Institute with Richard Bawden and Roger Packham, and in the same period he also was Adjunct Professor at the Institute for Sustainable Futures.

In 2014, Ison became president of the International Society for the Systems Sciences for a term of one year.

== Selected publications ==
=== Books ===
- With Pearson, Craig J. Agronomy of grassland systems. Cambridge University Press, 1997.
- With Russell, David. Agricultural extension and rural development: breaking out of knowledge transfer traditions. Cambridge University Press, 2007.
- Systems Practice: How to Act in a Climate Change World. Springer Science & Business Media, 2010.

=== Articles ===
Selected articles:

- With Ray, Niels Röling, and Drennan Watson. "Challenges to science and society in the sustainable management and use of water: investigating the role of social learning." Environmental Science & Policy 10.6 (2007): pp. 499–511.
- With Collins, Kevin. "Jumping off Arnstein's ladder: social learning as a new policy paradigm for climate change adaptation." Environmental Policy and Governance 19.6 (2009): pp. 358–373.
- With Russell, David Fruits of Gregory Bateson’s epistemological crisis: embodied mind-making and interactive experience in research and professional praxis. Canadian Journal of Communication, 42(3) (2017): pp. 485–514.
