= GTRI Agricultural Technology Research Program =

Agricultural Technology Research Program at Georgia Tech
- Type: Nonprofit
- Industry: Research and Development; Engineering; Science
- Founded: Atlanta, Georgia (1973)
- Headquarters: Atlanta, Georgia, USA
- Key people: Gary McMurray; Division Chief, ISTD; Doug Britton; Associate Division Chief, ISTD; ATRP Program Manager
- Parent: Georgia Tech Research Institute
- Website: www.atrp.gatech.edu

The Agricultural Technology Research Program (ATRP) is part of the Aerospace, Transportation and Advanced Systems Laboratory of the Georgia Tech Research Institute. It was founded in 1973 to work with Georgia agribusiness, especially the poultry industry, to develop new technologies and adapt existing ones for specialized industrial needs. The program's goal is to improve productivity, reduce costs, and enhance safety and health through technological innovations.

ATRP conducts state-sponsored and contract research for industry and government agencies. Researchers focus efforts on both immediate and long-term industrial needs, including advanced robotic systems for materials handling, machine-vision developments for grading and control, improved wastewater treatment technologies, and biosensors for rapid microbial detection. With guidance from the Georgia Poultry Federation, ATRP also conducts a variety of outreach activities to provide the industry with timely information and technical assistance. Researchers have complementary backgrounds in mechanical, electrical, computer, environmental, and safety engineering; physics; and microbiology.

ATRP is one of the oldest and largest agricultural technology research and development programs in the nation, and is conducted in cooperation with the Georgia Poultry Federation with funding from the Georgia General Assembly.

== Research and development areas ==
=== Robotics and automation systems ===
Robotics/automation research studies focus heavily on integrated, "intelligent" automation systems. These systems offer major opportunities to further enhance productivity in the poultry and food processing industries. They incorporate advanced sensors, robotics, and computer simulation and control technologies in an integrated package and tackle a number of unique challenges in trying to address specific industrial needs.

=== Advanced imaging and sensor concepts ===
Advanced imaging and sensor concepts research studies focus on the design of systems for grading and inspection using stereoscopic 3D, time-of-flight, visible, IR, and UV imaging modalities. The program has already introduced several commercially viable designs. Two recent examples include improving the deboning of chicken and the baking of buns.

=== Environmental and energy systems ===
Environmental and energy research studies focus on emerging technologies that help to reduce water usage and waste generation, while also facilitating the recovery of waste heat and value-added byproducts from processing operations. Improved recycling technologies, in particular, are pursued to assist not only in recycling water but also in recycling marinades, brines, etc., thereby reducing their impact on waste treatment operations. Studies also focus on understanding of how waste is generated and how to more effectively remove it from air and water streams. Researchers have also begun to develop new processes designed to enhance the conversion of low-quality waste oils and grease to high-grade fuels.

=== Worker safety technologies ===
Worker safety research focuses on finding new ways to reduce the risk of injury. Research conducted by the program into ergonomic risk quantification demonstrates the value of technology in addressing this challenge. In an effort to help the industry pursue a scientific base for assessing and controlling injury, researchers have developed an Ergonomic Work Assessment System (EWAS) to measure exposure in the actual processing plant.

=== Product safety technologies ===
Product safety research focuses on technologies to improve control of process and product quality. The program's innovative biosensor development is being used in studies with other sensing technologies as screening and control systems for microbial/chemical intervention and water recycling processes.

== Industry outreach ==
=== Technical assistance ===
ATRP engineers provide engineering technical assistance at no charge to members of the Georgia poultry industry. Designed to help companies and individuals who do not otherwise have access to engineering expertise, this program draws upon engineers and consultants from the Georgia Tech community in a variety of specialized areas, such as automation, waste management, ergonomics, economic impact, and plant safety and health.

More than 30 technical assists are provided annually to firms and individuals across the state. These assists range from simple inquiries regarding information or help needed to address a problem to extensive on-site consultation, in which researchers analyze a problem and provide a full report of their findings and recommendations. The program uses input from these assists to gauge opportunities calling for new research initiatives.

=== Technology transfer and outreach ===
ATRP uses newsletters, seminars, research reviews, topical reports, research reports, technical papers, and articles in industry trade publications to transfer its research findings and expertise. Specifically, the program produces PoultryTech, a newsletter published three times a year and distributed free of charge to subscribers. ATRP, in conjunction with the Georgia Poultry Federation, the National Chicken Council, and the National Turkey Federation, annually hosts the National Safety Conference for the Poultry Industry. Each year, more than 90 safety professionals and exhibiting vendors from across the United States attend the three-day conference, which provides a national forum for information transfer on safety management in the poultry industry.
