= System Dynamics Society =

System Dynamics Society SDS
- Formation: 1983
- Type: not-for-profit membership organization
- Headquarters: Littleton, MA, U.S.
- Location(s): 451 King Street #542; Littleton, MA 01460-0542 USA; United States
- Region served: Worldwide
- Members: in over 35 countries
- Official language: English
- President: Shayne Gary – University of New South Wales (2022)
- Immediate Past President: Paulo Gonçalves – University of Lugano, Switzerland
- Executive Director: Rebecca Niles
- Website: www.systemdynamics.org

The System Dynamics Society is an international, nonprofit organization formed in 1983.

== History ==
The society was formed in 1983 through resolution passed by 120 delegates naming Jay Forrester as the first president.

The activity of the society has thereafter continued both to hold an international, annual conference and to sponsor publications of research in the area.

== Governance ==
The society is structured into officers and policy council members, standing committees and Home office teams.

== List of presidents of the System Dynamics Society ==
- 2023 - Shayne Gary – University of New South Wales - Australia
- 2022 - J. Bradley Morrison – Brandeis University - United States of America
- 2021 - Paulo Gonclaves - University of Lugano, Switzerland
- 2020 - Birgit Kopainsky - University of Bergen, Norway
- 2019 - Martin F. G. Schaffernicht – Universidad de Talca, Chile
- 2018 - I. Martínez-Moyano – Argonne National Laboratory, United States of America
- 2017 - Leonard Malczynski - Sandia National Laboratories - United States of America
- 2016 - Etiënne A.J.A. Rouwette - Radboud University - The Netherlands
- 2015 - Jürgen Strohhecker - Frankfurt School of Finance and Management - Germany
- 2014 - Edward G. Anderson - University of Texas - United States of America
- 2013 - Kim Warren - London Business School - United Kingdom
- 2012 - David Ford - Texas A&M University - United States of America
- 2011 - David Lane - London School of Economics - United Kingdom
- 2010 - Rogelio Oliva - Texas A&M University - United States of America
- 2009 - Erling Moxnes - University of Bergen - Norway
- 2008 - James M. Lyneis - Worcester Polytechnic Institute - United States of America
- 2007 - Qifan Wang - Huazhong University of Science and Technology - China
- 2006 - Michael J. Radzicki - Worcester Polytechnic Institute - United States of America
- 2005 - Graham Winch - University of Plymouth - United Kingdom
- 2004 - Robert Eberlein - Worcester Polytechnic Institute - United States of America
- 2003 - Pål I. Davidsen - University of Bergen - Norway
- 2002 - James H. Hines, Jr. - Massachusetts Institute of Technology - United States of America
- 2001 - Ali N. Mashayekhi - Sharif University of Technology - Iran
- 2000 - Jac A. M. Vennix - Radboud University - The Netherlands
- 1999 - Alexander L. Pugh, III - Pugh-Roberts Associates - United States of America
- 1998 - Yaman Barlas - Bogazici University - Turkey
- 1997 - George P. Richardson - State University of New York at Albany - United States of America
- 1996 - John D. W. Morecroft - London Business School - United Kingdom
- 1995 - Khalid Saeed - Asian Institute of Technology - Thailand
- 1994 - Andrew Ford - Washington State University - United States of America
- 1993 - Peter M. Milling - University of Stuttgart - Germany
- 1992 - John D. Sterman - Massachusetts Institute of Technology - United States of America
- 1991 - Erich K. O. Zahn - University of Stuttgart - Germany
- 1990 - Peter Gardiner - University of Southern California - United States of America
- 1989 - Eric F. Wolstenholme - University of Bradford - United Kingdom
- 1987-1988 - Nathan B. Forrester - Massachusetts Institute of Technology - United States of America
- 1986-1987 - Dennis L. Meadows - Dartmouth College
- 1985-1986 - Jørgen Randers - Ministry of Long-Term Planning - Norway
- 1984-1985 - David F. Andersen - State University of New York at Albany - United States of America
- 1983-1984 - Jay W. Forrester - Massachusetts Institute of Technology - United States of America

== Chapters ==
The society has the following chapters as of 2021:

- African Regional
- ASEAN
- Benelux
- Brazil
- China
- German
- Indian
- Indonesian
- Iranian
- Italian
- Japanese
- Korean
- Latin American
- Nigerian
- Oceania (Australasian)
- Pakistani
- Russian
- South African
- Student
- Swiss
- United Kingdom

=== Economics Chapter ===
The Economics Chapter of the System Dynamics Society is a part of the System Dynamics Society, which deals with different objectives concerning system dynamics. The objectives of this chapter are;

- To identify, extend and unify knowledge contributing to the understanding and betterment of economic systems through the use of System Dynamics.
- To promote the development of the fields of Economics and System Dynamics.
- To encourage and develop educational programs related to the behavior of economic systems.
- To promote pluralism within the economics profession.

To accomplish these objectives the Economics Chapter proposes to conduct chapter meetings and to publish a journal, newsletter, website, books, and other materials. The president in 2007 is I. David Wheat, Jr., Senior Lecturer in System Dynamics, University of Bergen, Norway. Immediate Past-President is Oleg V. Pavlov, Assistant Professor, Worcester Polytechnic Institute, USA. And there are currently 71 members in this chapter.

== Special Interest Groups ==
As of 2021, the System Dynamics Society has the following Special Interest Groups (SIG)

- Agriculture & Food
- Asset Dynamics
- Biomedical
- Business
- Conflict, Defense, and Security
- Economics
- Education
- Energy
- Environmental
- Health Policy
- Model Analysis
- Pre-College Education
- Psychology and Human Behavior
- Social Impact
- Structural Racism
- Transportation
- Water

== See also ==
- Institute for Operations Research and the Management Sciences
