= Western Transportation Institute =

US research center

The Western Transportation Institute (WTI) is a center of rural transportation research and education, located in the College of Engineering at Montana State University in Bozeman, MT. The WTI was founded in 1994 as a collaboration between Montana State University, the Montana Department of Transportation, and the California Department of Transportation, and is devoted to the improvement of transportation and travel in rural America.

The WTI has been affiliated with the engineering department at Montana State University since its inception, and the Institute has professional and student offices on the university's campus. Montana State University also leases the office space that house the WTI's primary off-campus facilities, which include meeting spaces, as well as state-of-the-art laboratories.

== Affiliation with U.S. Department of Transportation ==
The Western Transportation Institute was established as a national University Transportation Center (UTC) by the U.S. Department of Transportation in 1998, and was formally reauthorized as a UTC in 2005. As a UTC, the WTI is recognized as a federal transportation center whose specific focus area is mobility in rural transportation and travel. The significance of the federal designation is summarized in the UTC's mission statement, which states that the program's objective is "to advance U.S. technology and expertise in the many disciplines comprising transportation through the mechanism of education, research, and technology transfer at university-based centers of excellence."

Due to UTC designation, the WTI receives federal funding and its annual budget is more than $5 million.

== Areas of research ==
The WTI does extensive research into eight primary areas related to rural travel and transportation; these areas are:

- infrastructure maintenance and materials,
- logistics and freight management,
- mobility and public transportation,
- road ecology,
- safety and operations,
- systems engineering development and integration,
- transportation planning and economics.
- winter maintenance and effects,
