= Brian Wilson (systems scientist) =

British systems scientist

Brian Wilson (born 1933 in Newton-le-Willows, Lancashire) is a British systems scientist and honorary professor at Cardiff University, known for his development of soft systems methodology (SSM) and enterprise modelling.

== Biography ==
After graduating from University of Nottingham with a B.Sc. and Ph.D. in electrical engineering, nuclear power engineering and control system design, Wilson joined the United Kingdom Atomic Energy Authority where he studied the control and spatial stability of gas-cooled reactors and power plants. In 1966, he left the world of nuclear power engineering and control system design, and became a founder member of the Department of Systems Engineering at the University of Lancaster.

Wilson has had an association with Cardiff University for a number of years, in a variety of roles, and has recently been conferred as an honorary professor in the Department of Computer Science.

He left the University of Lancaster in 1992 and built his own consultancy company, Brian Wilson & Associates, where he continued to develop and apply his particular brand of SSM, leading to the uses of SSM in enterprise model building.

== Work ==
During his time at the University of Lancaster, Wilson was involved in the development of a particular form of business analysis known as soft systems methodology (SSM). This development was driven by the action research programme carried out in that department, in which his particular interest was the application of SSM to information and organisation-based analysis. The work appeared in the book, Systems: Concepts, methodologies and Applications, (editions 1 & 2), published by John Wiley.

He has 40 years of experience of tackling organisation-based problems of various kinds and he has undertaken projects in the pharmaceutical industry, the Met Office, the Office of Government Commerce (OGC), the Ministry of Defence (MoD), the Police, the National Health Service and a variety of other organisations in both private and public sectors.

His most recent work has been focused with the development of SSM-based models to bring about the integration of children's services within Tameside; to contribute to the MOD's "Carrier Strike" programme and to explore the organisation of the detection and containment of illegal importation and use of nuclear and radiological materials as part of the anti-terrorist programme, "Cyclamen". Also, a contribution was made to the development of an "enterprise" architecture for information assurance in the public sector and to the development of new information support across a number of publishing companies within Hachette Livre.

== Publications ==
Books:

- 1980, Systems: Concepts, methodologies and Applications, John Wiley.
- 2001, Soft Systems Methodology—Conceptual model building and its contribution, J.H.Wiley.

Papers:

- 2006, Deriving Information Requirements
