= Rich picture =

Visual thinking method

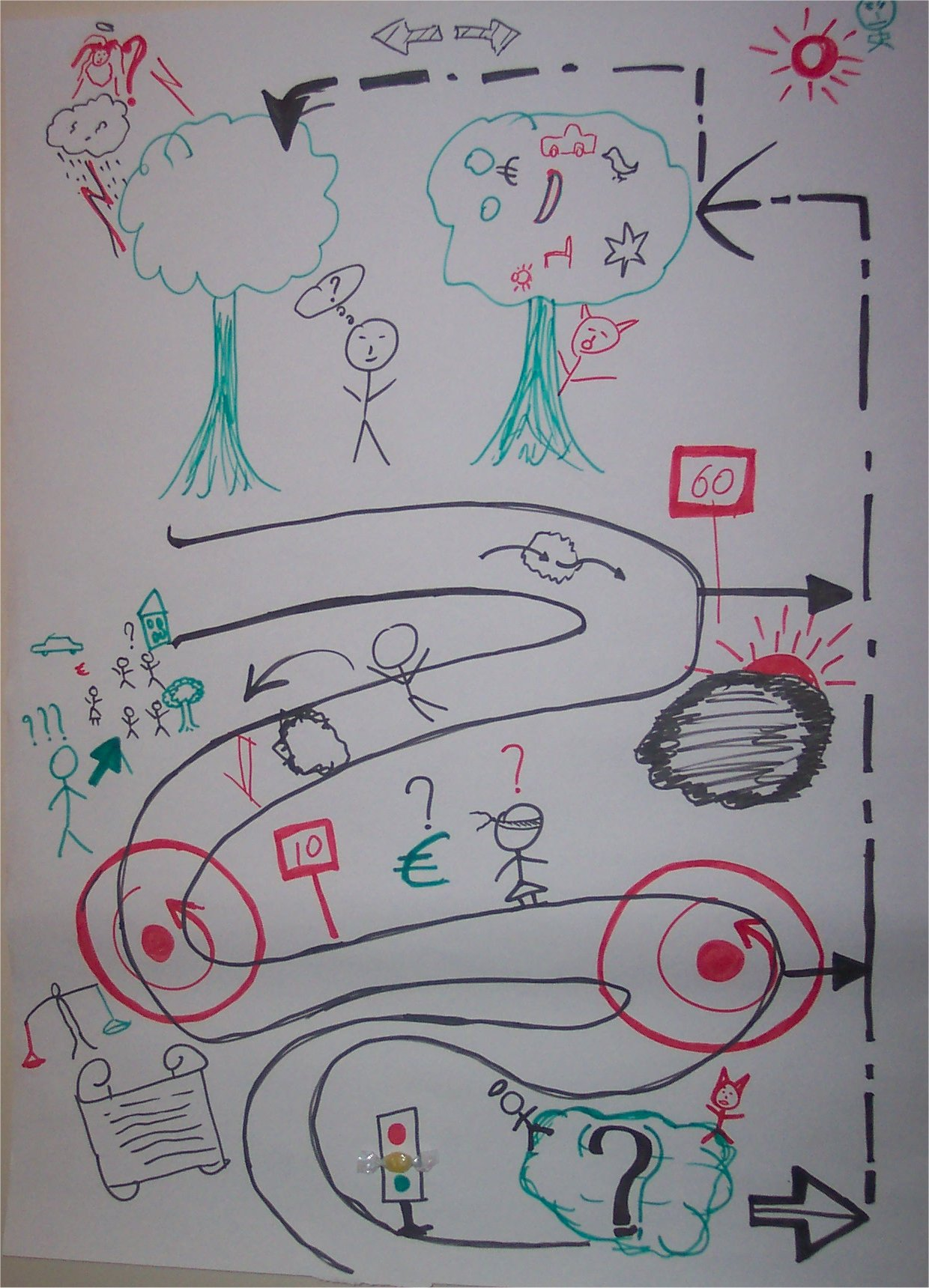
An example of a rich picture

Part of the soft systems methodology, rich pictures provide a mechanism for learning about complex or ill-defined problems by drawing detailed ("rich") representations of them. Typically, rich pictures follow no commonly agreed syntax, usually consist of symbols, cartoons, sketches or doodles and can contain as much (pictorial) information as is deemed necessary. The finished picture may be of value to other stakeholders of the problem being described since it is likely to capture many different facets of the situation, but the real value of this technique is the way it forces the creator to think more deeply about the problem and understand it well enough to express it pictorially (a process known as action learning).

Rich pictures are a diagrammatic way of relating your own experiences and perceptions to a given problem situation through the identification and linking of a series of concepts. The creation of a rich picture provides a forum in which to think about a given situation. Rich pictures should concentrate on both the structure and the processes of a given situation.

Rich pictures are a part of the understanding process, not just a way of recording what you know of a given situation or creating a work of art. The use of metaphor in rich pictures means that their interpretation by others can often be difficult. This is of little consequence as it is the personal learning aspects that are important to this method.

It is also possible to produce rich pictures as part of a group. By having everybody contribute to a rich picture they can be used to help develop a shared understanding of a given situation.

Mind maps are often considered to be rich pictures, but since these tend to be mainly text-based and do dictate a degree of formality with respect to their structure, clear distinctions can be drawn. Generally, the two notations serve different purposes (for example, in the field of systems engineering).

== See also ==
- Graphic facilitation
