= CompuMath Citation Index =

CompuMath Citation Index is an indexing service published by Thomson Reuters, and was first available in 1982 as an Institute for Scientific Information database. Coverage of the index included the literature pertaining to pure and applied mathematics, computer science, mathematical physics, econometrics, statistics, systems analysis, biometrics, psychometrics, and computer related medical fields.
