= Soft systems methodology =

Problem-solving method

Soft systems methodology (SSM) is an organised way of thinking applicable to problematic social situations and in the management of change by using action. It was developed in England by academics at the Lancaster Systems Department on the basis of a ten-year action research programme.

== Overview ==
The Soft Systems Methodology was developed primarily by Peter Checkland, through 10 years of research with his colleagues, such as Brian Wilson. The method was derived from numerous earlier systems engineering processes, primarily because traditional 'hard' systems thinking was not able to account for larger organisational issues with many complex relationships. SSM has a primary use in the analysis of these complex situations, where there are divergent views about the definition of the problem.

These complex situations are known as "soft problems". They are usually real world problems where the goals and purposes of the problem are problematic themselves. Examples of soft problems include: How to improve the delivery of health services? and How to manage homelessness with young people? Soft approaches take as tacit that people's view of the world will change all the time and their preferences of it will also change.

Depending on the current circumstances of a situation, trying to agree on the problem may be difficult as there might be multiple factors to take into consideration, such as all the different kinds of methods used to tackle these problems. Additionally, Peter Checkland had moved away from the idea of 'obvious' problems and started working with situations to make concepts of models to use them as a source of questions to help with the problem. Soft systems methodologies then started to emerge as an organised learning system.

Purposeful activity models could be declared using worldviews, meaning they were never models of real-world action. Still, those relevant to disclosure and argument about real-world action led to them being called epistemological devices that could be used for discourse and debate. The distinction between the everyday world and systems thinking was to draw attention to the conscious use of systems language in developing intellectual devices which were used to structure debates or an exploration of the problem situation being addressed.

In its 'classic' form the methodology consists of seven steps, with initial appreciation of the problem situation leading to the modelling of several human activity systems that might be thought relevant to the problem situation. By getting all the relevant people who are the decision-makers in this situation to come together, sit down in discussion and exploration about the definition of the problem. Only then will the decision makers in said situation will more likely arrive at a mutual agreement which will settle any arguments or problems and help get to the solution over exactly what kind of changes could be either systemically desirable and feasible in the situation at hand.

Later explanations of the ideas give a more sophisticated view of this systemic method and give more attention to locating the methodology with respect to its philosophical underpinnings. It is the earlier classical view which is most widely used in practice (created by Peter Checkland). A common criticism of this earlier methodology is that it follows an approach that is too linear. Checkland himself agreed that the earlier methodology is 'rather bald'. Most advanced SSM analysts will agree, though, that the classical view is an easy way for inexperienced analysts to learn the SSM methodology.

SSM has been successfully used as a business analysis methodology in various fields. Real-world examples of SSM's wide range of applicability include research applying SSM in the sugar industry leading to improvements in business partner relationships, successful use as an approach in project management by directly involving stakeholders or aiding in business management by improving communication between stakeholders. It has proven to be a useful analysis approach to teaching and learning processes, as it does not require a specific problem to be identified as its starting point – which has led to "outside of the box" suggestions for improvement. SSM was even used by the UK government as part of the revaluation of their Structured Systems Analysis and Design Method (SSADM) system development methodology.

Even professional researchers who are to take the change for face value structure of thinking, show the same tendency to distort perceptions of the world rather than change the mental structure which we give our bearings with. Failure of classic systems in rich 'management' problem situations during the research programme led to examining the adequacy of the systems thinking.

The methodology has been described in several books and many academic articles.

SSM remains the most widely used and practical application of systems thinking, and other systems approaches such as critical systems thinking have incorporated many of its ideas.

== Representation evolution ==
SSM had a gradual development process of the methodology as a whole from 1972 to 1990. During this period of time, four different representations of SSM were designed, becoming more sophisticated and at the same time less structured and broader in scope.

=== Blocks and arrows (1972) ===
The first studies in the research programme were carried out in 1969, and the first account of what became SSM was published in a paper three-years later titled "Towards a systems-based methodology for real-world problem solving" (Checkland 1972). In this paper, soft systems methodology is presented as a sequence of stages with iteration back to previous stages.The sequence was as follows: analysis, root definition of relevant systems, conceptualisation, comparison and definition of changes, selection of change to implement, design of change and implementation and appraisal.

The overall aim to implement change instead of introducing or enhancing a system implies that the thinking was ongoing as a result of these early experiences, even if the straight arrows in the diagrams and the rectangular blocks in some of the models can now be misleading!

=== Seven stages (1981) ===
Soft systems methodology (SSM) is a powerful tool that is utilised to analyse very complex organisational and systemic problems, that do not have an obvious solution. The methodology incorporates seven steps to come up with a viable solution for the problem defined. The seven steps are;

1. Enter situation in which a problem situation(s) have been identified
2. Address the issue at hand
3. Formulate root definitions of relevant systems of purposeful activity
4. Build conceptual models of the systems named in the root definitions : This methodology comes into place from raising concerns/ capturing problems within an organisation and looking into ways how it can be solved. Defining the root definition also describes the root purpose of a system.
5. The comparison stage: The systems thinker is to compare the perceived conceptual models against an intuitive perception of a real-world situation or scenario. Checkland defines this stage as the comparison of Stage 4 with Stage 2, formally, "Comparison of 4 with 2". Parts of the problem situation analysed in Stage 2 are to be examined alongside the conceptual model(s) created in Stage 4, this helps to achieve a "complete" comparison.
6. Problems identified should be accompanied now by feasible and desirable changes that will distinctly help the problem situation based in the system given. Human activity systems and other aspects of the system should be considered so that soft systems thinking, and Mumford's needs can be achieved with the potential changes. These potential changes should not be acted on until step 7 but they should be feasible enough to act upon to improve the problem situation.
7. Take action to improve the problem situation

=== Two streams (1988) ===
The two-stream model of SSM recognizes the crucially important role of history in human affairs, and for a given group of people their history determines what will be noticed as significant and how it will be judged. This expression of SSM is presented as an approach embodying not only a logic-based stream of analysis (via activity models) but also a cultural and political stream which enable judgements to be made about the accommodations between conflicting interests which might be reachable by the people concerned and which would enable action to be taken.

This particular expression of SSM removes the dividing line between the world of the problem situation and the systems thinking world.

=== Four main activities (1990) ===
The four-activities model is iconic rather than descriptive and subsumes the cultural stream of analysis in the four activities. The seven stage model gave an approach which applies real world situations, both large and small and public and private sector. The four main activities were created as a way to capture the more flexible use of SSM and to include more of the cultural aspect of the workplace into the concept of SSM. The four activities are used to show that SSM does not have to be used rigidly; it's there to show real life and not be constrained. The four main activities should be seen as an individual concept rather than a descriptive which incorporates the cultural stream of analysis. The four activities are:

1. Finding out about a problem situation, including culturally/politically
2. Formulating some relevant purposeful activity models: Creating and drawing specific diagrammatic illustrations of activity processes that occur in an organisation, which shows the relevant processes that take place in a structured order, and depicts any problem situation visually by showing the flow of one action to another. An example of this would be a diagram of a Soft Systems Methodology method, which is a 'Conceptual Model', which is a representation of a systems' human actions, or an 'Architecture System Map', which is a visual representation of the implementation of sections of a software system.
3. Debating the situation, using the models, seeking from that debate both:
  - changes which would improve the situation and are regarded as both desirable and (culturally) feasible, and
  - the accommodations between conflicting interests which will enable action
4. Taking action in the situation to bring about improvement

== CATWOE ==
In 1975, David Smyth, a researcher in Checkland's department, observed that SSM was most successful when the root definition included certain elements. These elements, captured in the mnemonic CATWOE, identified the people, processes and environment that contribute to a situation, issue or problem that required analyzing.

This is used to prompt thinking about what the business is trying to achieve. In further detail, CATWOE helps explore a system by underlining the roots which involve turning the inputs into outputs. CATWOE helps businesses as it analyses a gap between current and useful systems. Business perspectives help the business analyst to consider the impact of any proposed solution on the people involved. This mainly involves stakeholders which allows them to test assumptions they have made as stakeholders will all have different opinions about certain problems and opportunities. CATWOE's method helps gain better and achievable results, as well as avoiding additional problems using six elements. The six elements of CATWOE are:

- Customers – Who are the beneficiaries of the highest level business process and how does the issue affect them?
- Actors - The person or people directly involved in the transformation (T) part of CATWOE (Checkland & Scholes, 1999, p. 35). Implementation and involvement by the actors allows for the input to be transformed into an output (Checkland & Scholes, 1999, p. 35). Actors are also stakeholders as their actions can affect the transformation process and the system as a whole. As actors are directly involved, they also have a 'holon' by which they interpret the world outside (Checkland & Scholes, 1999, p. 19) and so how they view the situation would impact their work and success.
- Transformation process – Change, in one word, is the centre of the transformation system; the process of the transformation is more important for the business solution system. This is because the change is what the industry 5.0 sustainability system intends. The purpose behind the transformation system where change is applied holds value. For example, when converting grapes into wine the purpose for Change is to supply to grape consumers more value of the grape (product), thus sustaining the product value systemically. What is the transformation that lies at the heart of the system - transforming grapes into wine, transforming unsold goods into sold goods, transforming a societal need into a societal need met? This means change, in one word, is the centre of the transformation system; the process of becoming is more important than the business solution system. This is because the change is what the industry 2.0 systemic sustainability system practice purpose solves. The purpose behind the transformation system where change is provides the change, thus the results. For example when converting grapes into wine the purpose for Change is to supply to members of the public interest or involvement in grapes more value of the product, thus sustaining the product value more systemically.
- Weltanschauung (or Worldview) – What is the big picture and what are the wider impacts of the issue? "The word Weltanschauung is a German word that has no real English equivalent. It refers to "all the things that you take for granted" and is related to our values". But the closest translation would be "world view", which is the collective summary of the stakeholders belief that gives meaning to the root definition. Model of the human activity system as a whole.
- Owner – Who owns the process or situation being investigated and what role will they play in the solution?
- Environmental constraints – What are the constraints and limitations that will impact the solution and its success?

CATWOE can also be related to the holistic multi-benefit analysis due to the multiple perspectives that are taken into consideration. It further understands the perspectives and concerns of different stakeholders involved in the human activity systems adhering to the core values of soft systems thinking allowing multiple perspectives to be appreciated with good knowledge management

== Human activity system ==
A human activity system can be defined as "notional system (i.e. not existing in any tangible form) where human beings are undertaking some activities that achieve some purpose".

Within most systems there will be many human activity systems integrated within it to form the whole system. Human activity systems can be used in SSM to establish worldviews (Weltanschauung) for people involved in problematic situations. The human activity systems approach assumes that all actors will act according to their own worldviews.

== See also ==
- Enterprise modelling
- Hard systems
- Holism
- List of thought processes
- Problem structuring methods
- Rich picture
- Structured systems analysis and design method
- Systems theory
- Systems philosophy
