= List of systems scientists =

This is a list of systems scientists, people who made notable contributions in the field of the systems sciences:

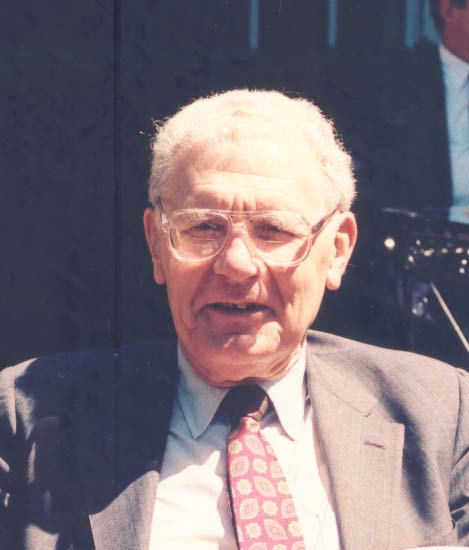
Russell Ackoff

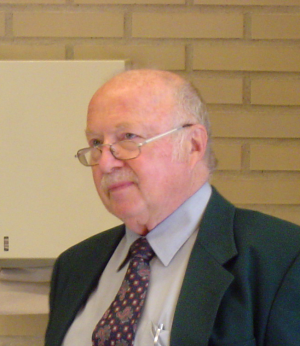
Gerhard Chroust

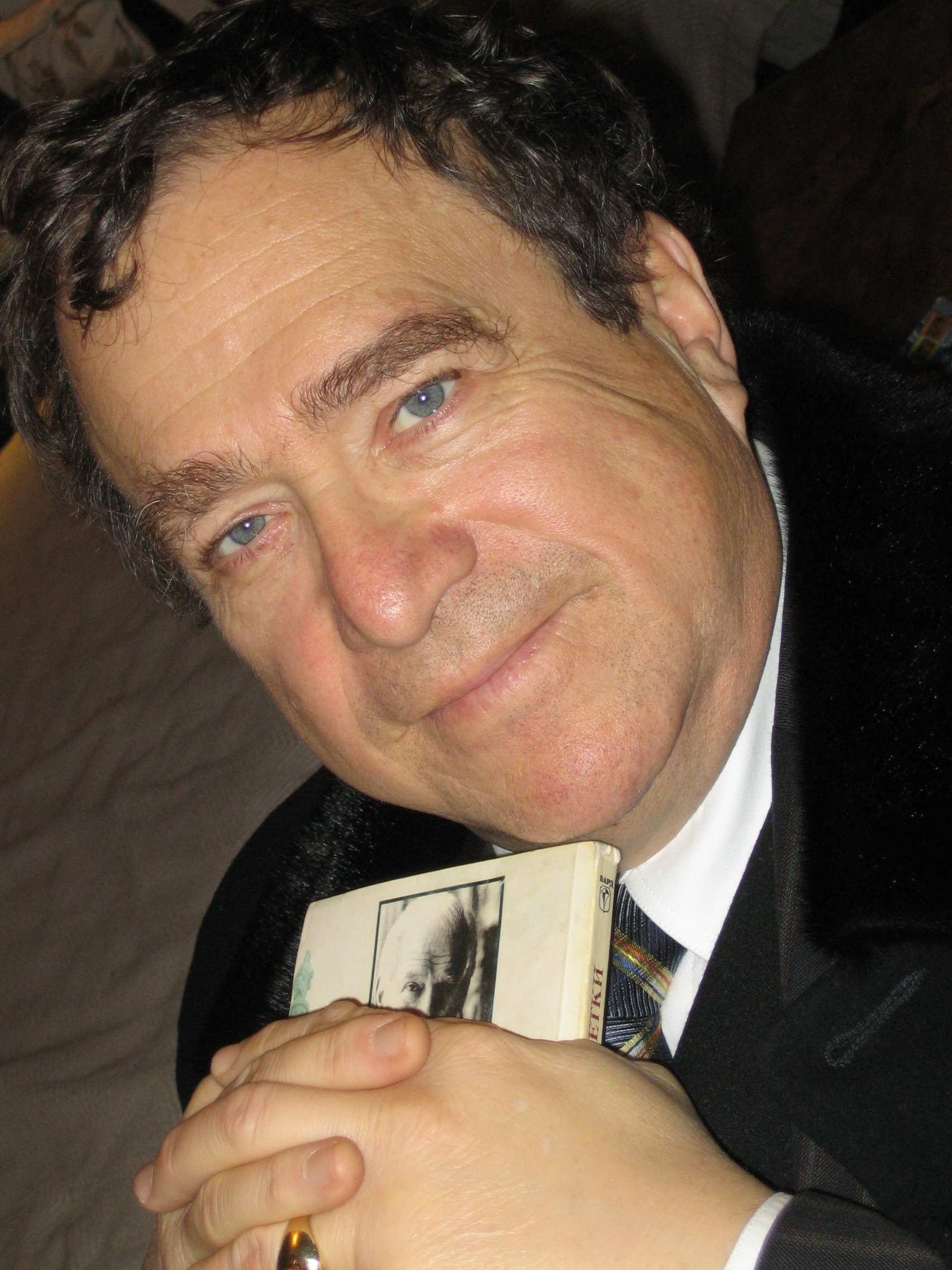
V. Damgov, 2005

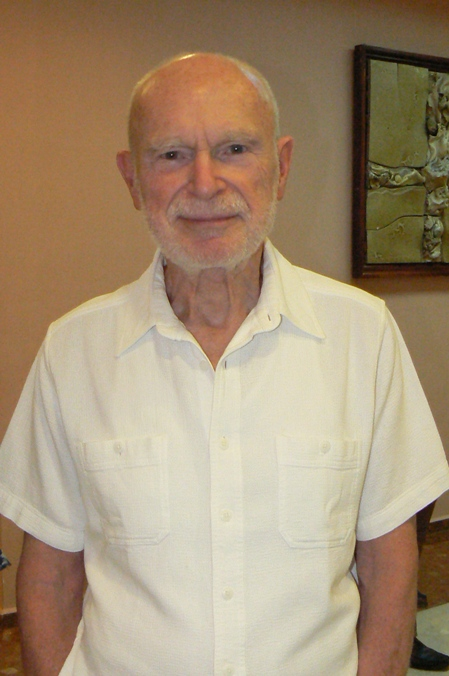
George Klir

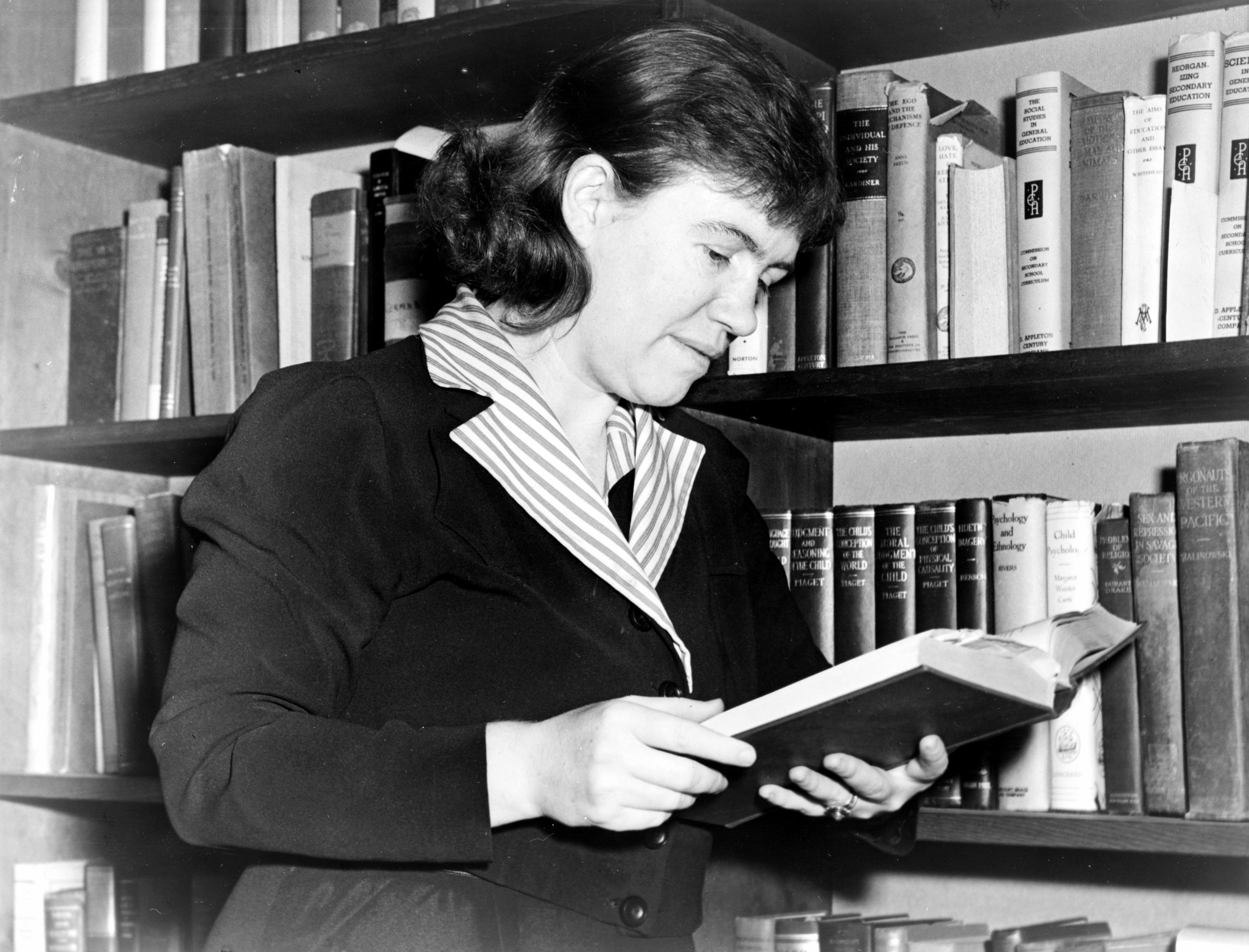
Margaret Mead

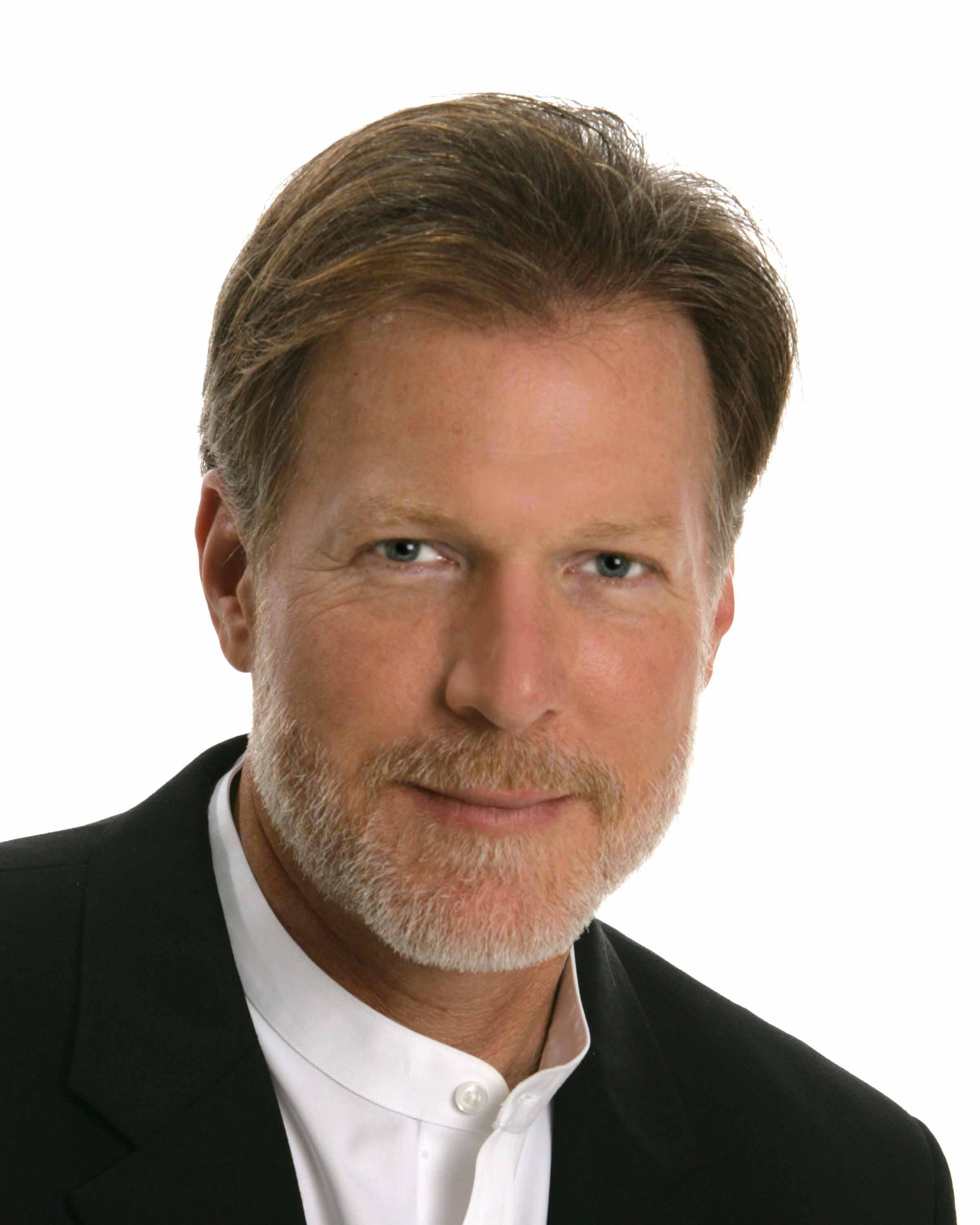
Gary Metcalf

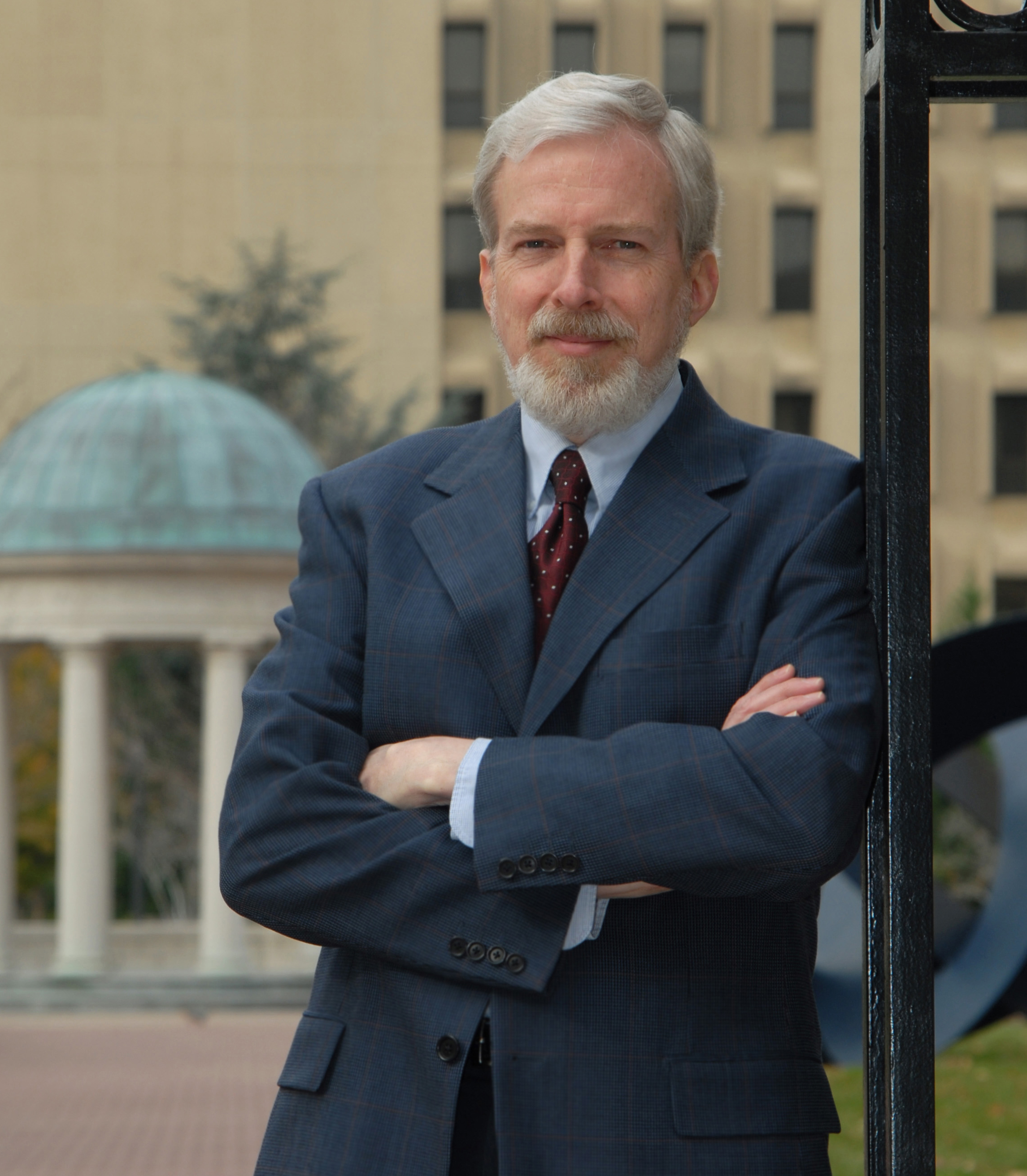
Stuart Umpleby

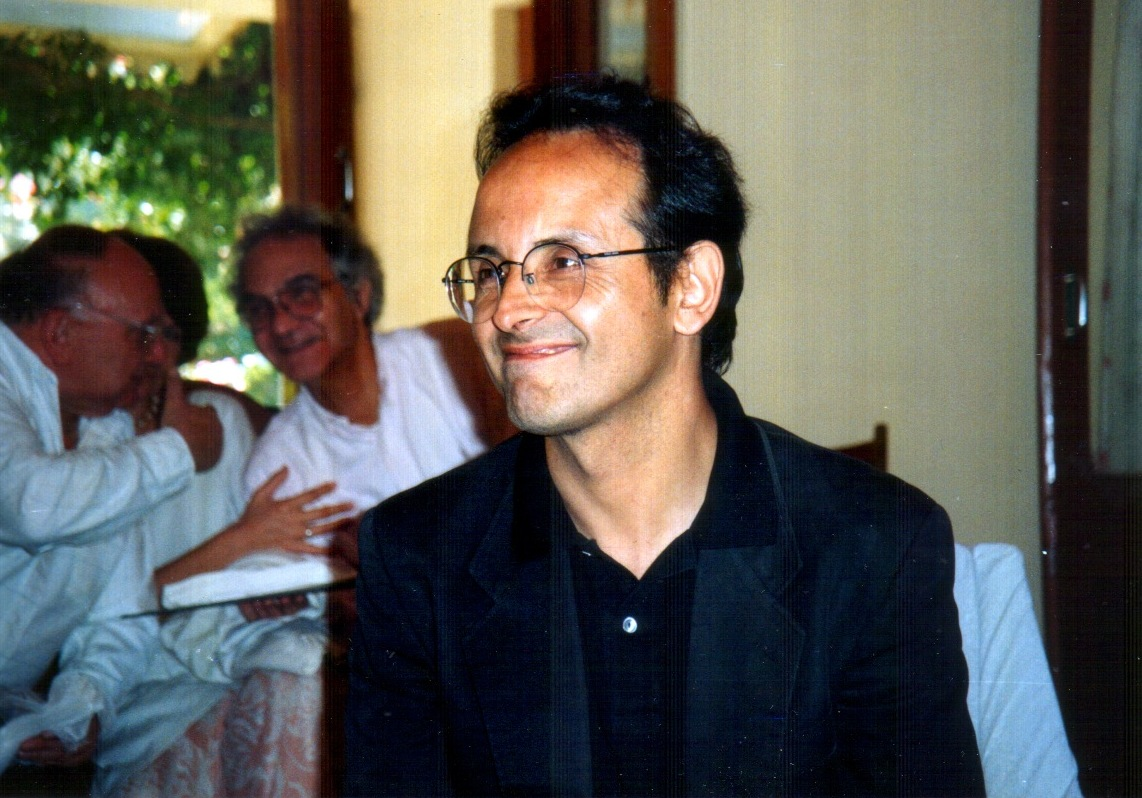
Francisco Varela

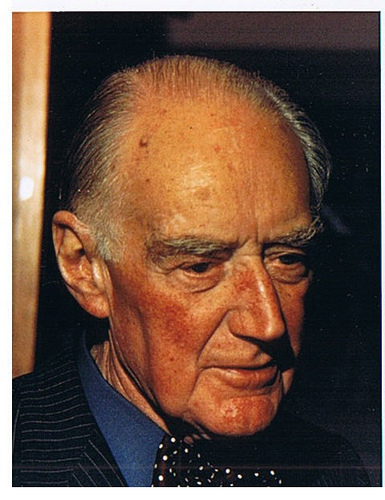
Charles Vickers

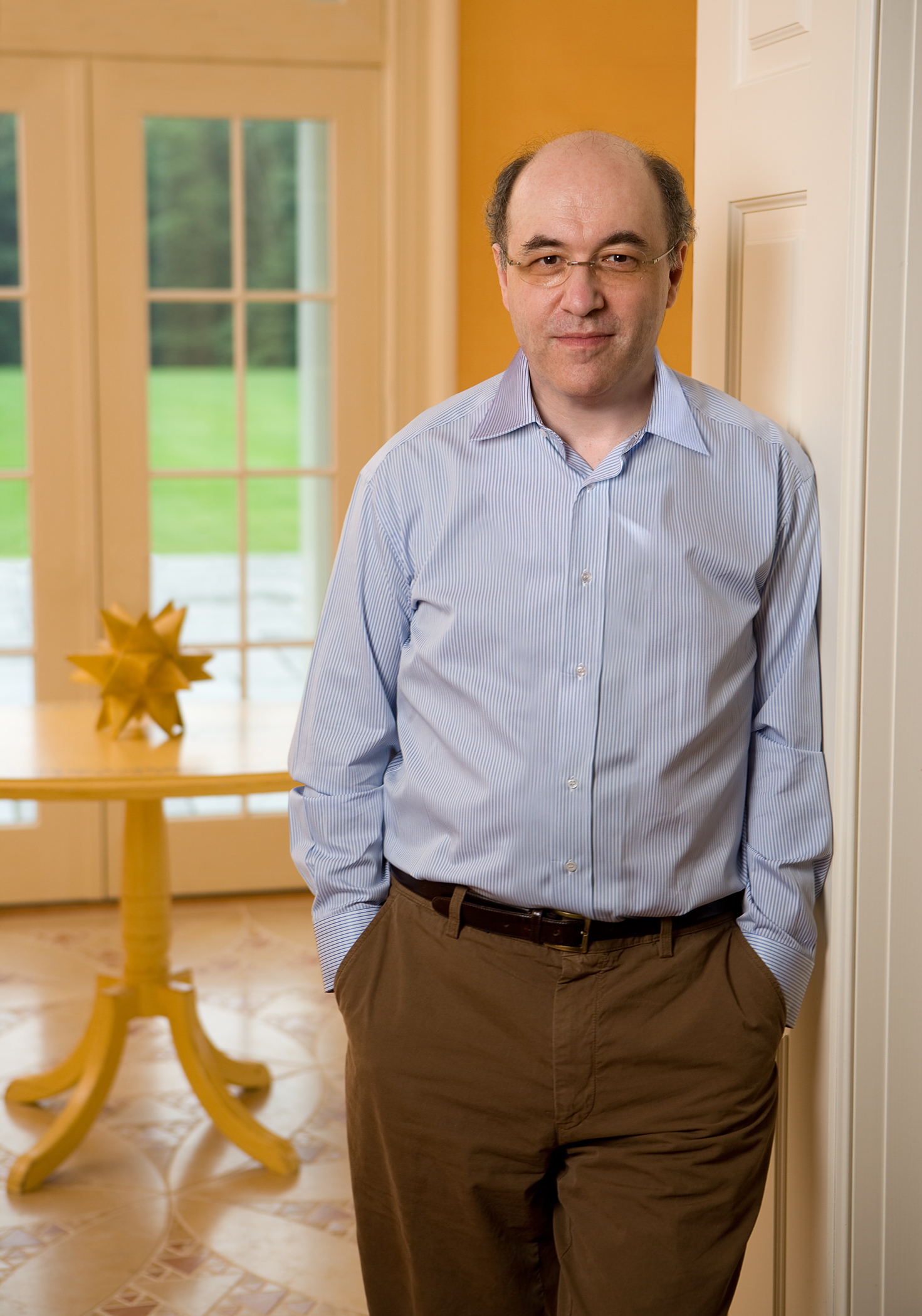
Stephen Wolfram

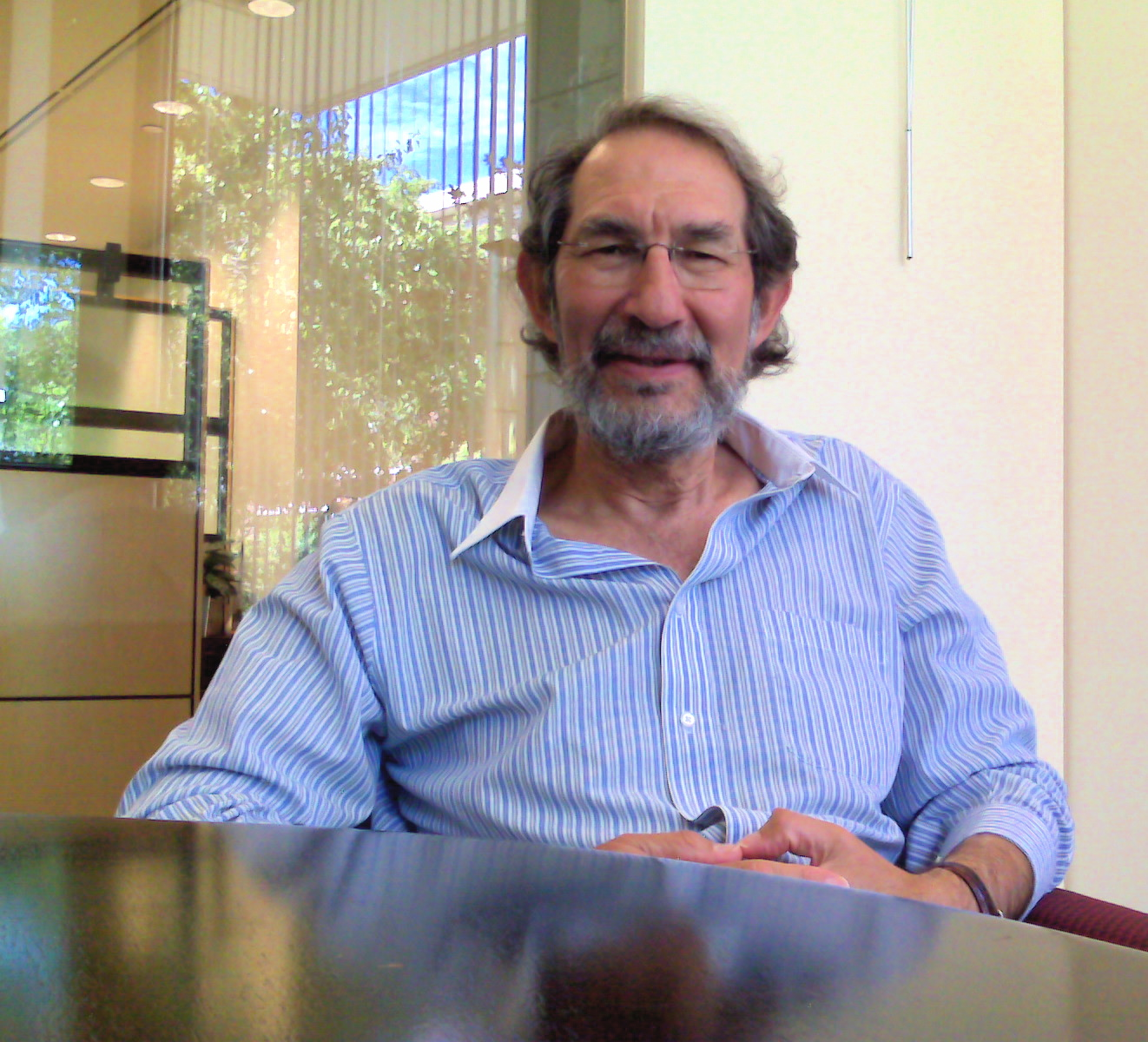
Geoffrey West

L.A. Zadeh

== A ==
- Russell L. Ackoff (1919–2009) American scientist in the field of management science, operations research and systems theory.
- Victor Aladjev (born 1942) Estonian mathematician and cybernetician, creator of the scientific school on the theory of homogeneous structures.
- Genrich Altshuller (1926–1998) Russian engineer and scientist, and inventor of the Theory of Inventive Problem Solving.
- Pyotr Anokhin (1898–1974) Russian biologist and physiologist who made important contributions to cybernetics and functional systems.
- Leo Apostel (1925–1995) Belgian philosopher who advocated of interdisciplinary research between exact science and humanities.
- W. Brian Arthur (born 1945) Irish economist, expert on economics and complexity theory in technology and financial markets, and other applications.
- W. Ross Ashby (1903–1972) English psychiatrist and a pioneer field of complex systems.

== B ==
- Per Bak (1948–2002) Danish theoretical physicist, to whom is attributed the development of the concept of self-organized criticality.
- Bela H. Banathy (1919–2003) Hungarian systems scientist, design scientist, educator, author and coordinator of many international systems research conferences.
- Béla A. Bánáthy (born 1946?) American systems scientist, who works at the International Systems Institute at the Saybrook Graduate School.
- Yaneer Bar-Yam (born 1959) American physicist, systems scientist and founding president of the New England Complex Systems Institute.
- Gregory Bateson (1904–1980) British anthropologist, social scientist, linguist, and cyberneticist whose work intersected that of many other fields.
- Kenneth D. Bailey (born 1943) American sociologist, who worked in the field of research methods, systems theory and environmental demography and ecology.
- Stafford Beer (1926–2002) British management scientist, known for his work in the fields of operational research and management cybernetics.
- Maamar Bettayeb (born 1953) Algerian control theorist and systems scientist in the fields of singular value decomposition and model order reduction.
- Harold Stephen Black (1898–1983) American electrical engineer, who revolutionized the field of applied electronics by inventing the negative feedback amplifier in 1927.
- Alexander Bogdanov (1873–1928) Russian physician, philosopher, economist, science fiction writer, and revolutionary.
- Kenneth E. Boulding (1910–1993) British economist, educator, peace activist, poet, religious mystic, devoted Quaker, systems scientist, and interdisciplinary philosopher.
- Murray Bowen (1913–1990) American psychiatrist and pioneers of family therapy and systemic therapy.
- Valentino Braitenberg (1926–2011) German neurologist and cyberneticist and pioneer in embodied cognitive science.
- Richard Peirce Brent (born 1946) Australian mathematician and computer scientist who is known for Brent's method of root finding.
- Gerrit Broekstra (born 1941) Dutch scientist and professor of organizational behavior and systems sciences.
- Walter F. Buckley (1922–2006) American sociologist, and among the first to apply General systems theory to sociology.
- Mario A. Bunge (1919–2020) Argentine-Canadian physicist and philosopher, author of the 8-volume Treatise on Basic Philosophy (1974–1989), comprising semantics, ontology, epistemology, philosophy of science and ethics. His systemism includes the CESM (composition-environment-structure-mechanism) model for describing and explaining concrete systems.

== C ==
- Donald T. Campbell (1916–1996) American social scientist, who coined the term evolutionary epistemology.
- Peter Checkland (born 1930) British management scientist, who developed soft systems methodology.
- Harold Chestnut (1918–2001) American electrical engineer and, who wrote some classic books about systems engineering.
- C. West Churchman (1913–2004) American philosopher in the field of management science, operations research and systems thinking.
- James J. Collins American bioengineer and MIT professor. He is one of the founders of the emerging field of synthetic biology, and a pioneering researcher in systems biology, stochastic resonance, biological dynamics and neurostimulation.
- Gerhard Chroust (born 1941) Austrian systems scientist, and Professor Emeritus for Systems Engineering and Automation at the Institute of System Sciences at the Johannes Kepler University of Linz, Austria.

== D ==
- Vladimir Damgov (1947–2006) Bulgarian physicist, mathematician, union leader and parliamentarian, who particularly contributed to the application of chaos theory.
- Herman Daly (born 1938) American ecological economist and steady-state theorist.
- George Dantzig (1914–2005) American mathematician who is considered the "father of linear programming".

== E ==
- David Easton (1917–2014) Canadian political scientist, who developed application of systems theory to political science.
- Frederick Edmund Emery (1925–1997) Australian psychologist, and pioneers in the field of Organizational development.
- Hugo O. Engelmann (1917–2002) American sociologist, anthropologist and general systems theorist.
- Joshua M. Epstein American expert in social and economic dynamics, and member of the Santa Fe Institute.
- Hugh Everett (1930–1982) American physicist, who developed the use of generalized lagrange multipliers in operations research.

== F ==
- J. Doyne Farmer (born 1952) American physicist, and one of the founding fathers of chaos theory.
- Mitchell Feigenbaum (1944–2019) American mathematical physicist whose pioneering studies in chaos theory led to the discovery of the Feigenbaum constants.
- Peter C. Fishburn (1936–2021) American scientist known as a pioneer in the field of decision making processes.
- Irmgard Flügge-Lotz (1903–1974) German-American mathematician who developed the theory of discontinuous automatic control systems and laid the foundation for automatic on-off aircraft control in jets
- Heinz von Foerster (1911–2002) Austrian-American scientist combining physics and philosophy. Together with Warren McCulloch, Norbert Wiener, and John von Neumann, Heinz von Foerster was the architect of cybernetics.
- Jay Forrester (1918–2016) American computer engineer, known as founder of System Dynamics, which deals with the simulation of interactions between objects in dynamic systems.
- Charles François (1922–2019) Belgian specialist in the field of cybernetics and systems science, known as founding editor of the International Encyclopedia of Systems and Cybernetics
- Christian Fuchs (born 1976) Austrian social scientist who focuses his research on information society theory, social theory, critical theory.
- Buckminster Fuller (1895–1983) American visionary, designer, architect, poet, author, and inventor. He was one of the first to propagate a systemic worldview and explored principles of energy efficiency and material efficiency in the fields of architecture, engineering and design.

== G ==
- Murray Gell-Mann (1929–2019) American physicist and Nobel Prize winner in physics for his work on the theory of elementary particles.
- Ralph Waldo Gerard (1900–1974) American neurophysiologist and behavioral scientist and one of the founders of the Society for General Systems Research.
- Jamshid Gharajedaghi (born c. 1940) American organizational theorist, management consultant, and Adjunct Professor of Systems thinking
- Tom Gilb (born 1940) American systems engineer.
- Harry H. Goode (1909–1960) American computer engineer and systems engineer and professor at University of Michigan. Until his death his was president of the National Joint Computer Committee (NJCC). He wrote the famous System Engineering Handbook together with Robert Engel Machol.
- Brian Goodwin (1931–2009) Canadian mathematician and biologist
- Barbara J. Grosz American computer scientist who developed the SharedPlans model for collaborative planning in multi-agent systems

== H ==
- Arthur David Hall III (1925–2006) American electrical engineer. He worked for years at Bell Labs. He was one of the founders of the (IEEE) and was among the first general systems theorists. He wrote A methodology of Systems Engineering from 1962.
- Stephen G. Haines (1945–2012) American organizational theorist and management consultant
- Debora Hammond American historian of science and a systems scientist
- Albert Hanken (1926–2016) Dutch mathematician and Emeritus Professor Systems theory at the University of Twente
- Friedrich Hayek (1899–1992) Nobel prize economist and a philosopher who made pioneering contributions to complexity theory. He notably wrote The Theory of Complex Phenomena (1967).
- Francis Heylighen (born 1960) Belgian cybernetician working on self-organization and the evolution of complex systems
- Derek Hitchins (born 1935) British systems engineer and was professor in engineering management, in command & control and in systems science at the Cranfield University, Bedfordshire, England.
- John Henry Holland (1929–2015) American pioneer in complex system and nonlinear science. He is known as the father of genetic algorithms.

== J ==
- Michael C. Jackson (born 1951) British systems scientist, and expert in Systems Thinking, Organizational Cybernetics, Creative Problem Solving and Critical Systems Thinking
- Gwilym Jenkins (1933–1982) British statistician and systems engineer
- Clarence Johnson (1910–1990) American aircraft engineer and aeronautical innovator

== K ==
- Rudolf Emil Kálmán (1930–2016) American-Hungarian mathematical system theorist, who is an electrical engineer by training.
- J. A. Scott Kelso (born 1947) Irish neuroscientist, who in 1985 he founded the Center for Complex Systems and Brain Sciences.
- Faina Mihajlovna Kirillova (1931–2024) Belarusian control theorist and former Department Head of the Institute of Mathematics of the National Academy of Sciences of Belarus. Author of over 350 scientific papers and monographs about optimal control theory.
- George Klir (1932–2016) Czech-American computer scientist and professor of systems sciences at the Center for Intelligent Systems at the Binghamton University in New York. Author of several texts on systems, including Architecture of Systems Problem Solving.
- Klaus Krippendorff (born 1932) German cyberneticist, working on the mathematical foundations of cybernetics, general systems, communication and information theories.

== L ==
- Christopher Langton (born 1949) American biologist and one of the founders of the field of artificial life
- Ervin László (born 1932) Hungarian philosopher of science, systems theorist, integral theorist, and classical pianist
- Ton de Leeuw (born 1941) Dutch organizational theorist
- Nancy Leveson (born 1944) American system safety pioneer of new methods for accident analysis
- Loet Leydesdorff (born 1948) Dutch sociologist and cyberneticist, known for his work sociology of communication and innovation
- Edward Norton Lorenz (1917–2008) American mathematician and meteorologist, and an early pioneer of the chaos theory
- Niklas Luhmann (1927–1998) German sociologist, developed a systems theory applicable in political science from Talcott Parsons works

== M ==
- Robert Engel Machol (1917–1998) American systems engineer and expert in the fields of operations research
- Humberto R. Maturana (1928–2021)
- Warren McCulloch (1899–1969)
- Donella Meadows (1941–2001) American environmental scientist, known as lead author of Limits to Growth
- Dennis Meadows (born 1942) American economist and systems scientist, known as coauthor of Limits to Growth
- Mihajlo D. Mesarovic
- Margaret Mead (1901–1978)
- Gary Metcalf (born 1957) American organizational theorist and president of the International Federation for Systems Research (2010–)
- James Grier Miller (1916–2002)
- Melanie Mitchell American scientist
- Ian Mitroff (born 1938) American organizational theorist and president of the International Society for the Systems Sciences (1992-93)
- Edgar Morin (1921–2026) French philosopher and sociologist

== N ==
- John von Neumann (1903–1957)

== O ==
- Eugene Odum (1913–2002) American scientist known for his pioneering work on ecosystem ecology
- Howard Thomas Odum (1924–2002) American ecosystem ecologist
- Linda Olds (born 1946?) American psychologist and pioneer in the field of systems psychology
- David Orrell Canadian mathematician

== P ==
- Bradford Parkinson American systems engineer
- Talcott Parsons (1902–1979)
- Gordon Pask (1928–1996)
- Samuel C. Phillips (1921–1990) officer in the U.S. Air Force
- Ilya Prigogine (1917–2003)
- Peter Pruzan (born 1937) Danish organizational theorist
- Prem Saran Satsangi (born 1937) Indian System Scientist

== R ==
- Simon Ramo (1913–2016) American physicist, engineer, and business leader
- Anatol Rapoport (1911–2007) Russian mathematician, psychologist and systems scientist; cofounder of the International Society for Systems Science
- Eberhardt Rechtin (1926–2006) American systems engineer and respected authority in aerospace systems and systems architecture
- Barry Richmond (1947–2002) American systems scientist
- Luis M. Rocha (born 1966) Portuguese-American systems thinker
- Robert Rosen (1934–1998) American biologist and systems thinker

== S ==
- Andrew P. Sage (1933–2014) American systems engineer and Emeritus Professor and Founding Dean Emeritus at the School of Information Technology and Engineering of the George Mason University
- Claude Shannon (1916–2001)
- Thomas B. Sheridan (born 1929) American mechanical engineering and pioneer of robotics and remote control technology
- Herbert A. Simon (1916–2001)
- Ulbo de Sitter (1930–2010) Dutch sociologist and professor of business administration at the Radboud University Nijmegen
- Henk G. Sol (born 1951) Dutch organizational theorist, consultant
- Georgiy Starostin (born 1976) Russian linguistics researcher at and a participant at the Santa Fe Institute's Evolution of Human Languages project
- Sytse Strijbos (born 1944) Dutch academic, lecturer of philosophy of technology at the Vrije Universiteit in Amsterdam

== T ==
- Len Troncale (born 1943) American biologist, systems theorist, Professor Emeritus of Cellular and Molecular Biology, and former Director of the Institute for Advanced Systems Studies at the California State Polytechnic University
- Arnold Tustin (1899–1994) British engineer
- Jaan Tallinn (born 1972) co-developer of the original Skype distributed system, co-founder of the Future of Life Institute and Centre for the Study of Existential Risk, accredited/trained physicist

== U ==
- Stuart A. Umpleby (born 1944) American cyberneticist working in the field of cross-cultural management, cybernetics, group facilitation methods, systems science and the use of computer networks.

== V ==
- Francisco J. Varela (1945–2001)
- Jan in 't Veld (1925–2005) Dutch aerospace engineer and organizational theorist
- Geoffrey Vickers (1894–1982)
- Ludwig von Bertalanffy (1901–1972) Austrian Canadian biologist, physiologist and systems scientist, and cofounder of the International Society for Systems Science

== W ==
- John Nelson Warfield (1925–2009) American electrical engineering and systems scientist, and member of the Academic Committee of the International Encyclopedia of Systems and Cybernetics.
- Kevin Warwick (born 1954) British cybernetician with interests in artificial intelligence, robotics, control systems and biomedical engineering, especially implant technology.
- Duncan J. Watts American professor of sociology
- Paul Watzlawick (1921–2007)
- Geoffrey West (born 1940) British physicist
- Douglas R. White (1942–2021) American complexity researcher, social anthropologist and sociologist.
- Brian Wilson British systems scientist, known for his development of Soft systems methodology.
- Stephen Wolfram (born 1959) English theorist known for his work in theoretical particle physics, cellular automata, complexity theory, and computer algebra.
- A. Wayne Wymore (1927–2011) American mathematician and systems engineer. Founder and first Chairman of Systems and Industrial Engineering (SIE) Department at the University of Arizona.
- Warren Weaver (1894–1978) American mathematician and communication scientist
- Norbert Wiener (1894–1964) American mathematician and one of the founders of cybernetics

== Z ==
- Lotfi Asker Zadeh
- Erik Christopher Zeeman (1925–2016) Japanese-born British mathematician known for work in geometric topology and singularity theory.
- Gerard de Zeeuw (born 1936) Dutch scientist and professor Mathematical modelling of complex social systems at the University of Amsterdam in the Netherlands.

== See also ==
- List of systems engineers
- People in systems and control
- List of systems sciences organizations
