= IGO Search =

IGO Search is a free service allowing search within all websites of organizations registered as intergovernmental organizations (IGOs) (over 3000 bodies, including the United Nations, the European Commission, and the World Bank).

It was launched in 2008 by the Union of International Associations (UIA), which has collected information on international non-profit non-governmental organizations since 1907. All of the organizations are profiled in detail in the Yearbook of International Organizations (Guide to Global Civil Society Networks). The UIA created their own search index to facilitate public access to information that those bodies make publicly available.

Stanford University Library experimented with their own IGO search interface, drawing on similar data sources, in 2008, but that service was later discontinued.

== See also ==
- Intergovernmental organizations
