= International Encyclopedia of Systems and Cybernetics =

1997 encyclopedia

- Author: Charles François
- Subject: Computer Science
- Genre: Academic
- Publication date: 1997
- ISBN: 9783598116308

The book International Encyclopedia of Systems and Cybernetics is an authoritative encyclopedia for systems theory, cybernetics, the complex systems science, which covers both theories and applications in areas as engineering, biology, medicine and social sciences. This book first published in 1997 aimed to give an overview over more than 40 years developments in the field of Systems and Cybernetics.

This book offers a collection of more than 3000 keywords and articles of Systems and Cybernetics. Many items contain quotes from authors from the field.

The book is edited by Belgian systems scientist and diplomat Charles François with an Academic board including members such as John N. Warfield, Robert Trappl, Ranulph Glanville, G. A. Swanson, Nicholas Paritsis, Daniel Dubois, Heiner Benking, Francisco Parra Luna, Anthony Judge, Markus Schwaninger, Gerhard Chroust, G. A. Swanson, Matjaž Mulej and Stuart Umpleby.

The first edition was published in 1997 in one volume with 450 pages by publisher K.G. Saur in Munich. The second edition was published in 2004, in two volumes and 741 pages by the same publisher. This update consisted of 1700 articles, some of them with figures, tables and diagrams, and 1500 bibliographical references. The genesis of the Encyclopedia was published by Anthony Judge in the Wall Street Journal and as Festschrift in 2001: UIA - Saur Relations: Sharing a Documentary Pilgrimage.
