= Charles François (systems scientist) =

Belgian systems scientist (1922–2019)

- Born: September 5, 1922
- Died: July 31, 2019
- Awards: Norbert Wiener golden medal, 2007
- Scientific career
- Fields: Systems scientist

Charles François (5 September 1922 – 31 July 2019) was a Belgian administrator, editor and scientist in the fields of cybernetics, systems theory and systems science, internationally known for his main work the International Encyclopedia of Systems and Cybernetics.

== Biography ==
Charles François was born in Belgium in 1922, and studied consular and commercial sciences at Brussels Free University. After the Second World War he emigrated to the Belgian Congo, where he stayed from 1945 to 1960, at first as an administrative officer in government and later on creating and developing his own commercial business, also exercising journalism and the socio-political chronicle. Later, he moved to Argentina in 1963, and managed the commercial Office of the Belgian Embassy in Buenos Aires from 1966 to his retirement in 1987.

François inspired and founded the Group for the Study of Integrated Systems, Argentine National Division of the International Society for the Systems Sciences, in 1976, and was its honorary president. He was an honorary member of the International Federation for Systems Research European Systems Society, and founding editor of the International Encyclopedia of Systems and Cybernetics, editions of 1997 and 2004 in two volumes.

He encouraged its work in progress in course of organization through the Bertalanffy Center of Systems and Cybernetics, member of the International Academy of Systems and Cybernetics Sciences, honorary president of the Latin American Association of Systemics, Honorary Professor of ITBA, and was a visiting professor at various universities and educational institutions in Argentina, Mexico, Perú, Colombia, Venezuela and Brasil, where he encouraged the creation of many study groups. He became a member of systemic boards and integrated the editorial boards of various journals on systems and cybernetics.

In 2007 he received the Norbert Wiener golden medal from the American Society for Cybernetics as a tribute for his work on cybernetics. He inspired the "Charles François Price" at the International Academy of Systems and Cybernetics Sciences, intended to promote contributions and participation of young systematists at their international meetings. François died on July 31, 2019.En su honor, el Grupo de Estudio de Sistemas Integrados (GESI) y colaboradores, editó en 2020:Charles François;pionero y mentor de instituciones sistémicas y cibernéticas en América Latina; un homenaje colectivo.

== Work ==
In 1952 François came in contact with cybernetics through Norbert Wiener's Cybernetics. In 1958 he joined the Society for General Systems Research now the International Society for the Systems Sciences. Since 1970, François has participated in numerous meetings of various systems and cybernetics societies.

Many courses and seminars on systemics and cybernetics were given by Charles François in Argentina and also in Perú at the IAS; the last edition of them is his "Curso de Teoría General de Sistemas y Cibernética con representaciones gráficas", a CD-ROM disk with more than 280 drawings edited by Group for the Study of Integrated Systems in 2007, also in English.

== Publications ==
Contributions in books:

- 1976, Cybernétique et Prospective, Namur: International Association of Cybernetics, 1976.
- 1978, Introducción à la Prospectiva Buenos Aires: Pleamar, 1978.
- 1985, El uso de Modelos Sistémicos-Cibernéticos como metodología científica, (Systemic-Cybernetic Models used as scientific methodology)
- 1986, Enfoques Sistémicos en el Estudio de las Sociedades (Systemic Approaches to the Study of Societies).
- 1992, Diccionario de Teoría General de Sistemas y Cibernética, Buenos Aires: GESI. The first work of its kind in Spanish (475 terms).
- 1997, International Encyclopedia of Systems and Cybernetics, edited by Charles François, München: K. G. Saur. The Academic board of this Encyclopedia includes members such as: John N. Warfield, Robert Trappl, Ranulph Glanville, Anthony Judge, Markus Schwaninger, Heiner Benking, Matjaz Mulej, and Gerhard Chroust.
- 2004 2nd. Edition of the International Encyclopedia of Systems and Cybernetics in two volumes.

Selected articles and papers:

- 1982, "A systemic study of socio-historical systems", paper 1982.
- 1999, "Systemics and Cybernetics in a Historical Perspective, ".
- 2000, Hidden long term systemic constraints in present-day socio-economical global mutation of mankind, paper.
- 2002, Foreign Debt mechanism: The "Cow in the corral" paper.
- 2004, The need for an integrated systemic-cybernetic language for concepts and models in complex and vague subject areas:... lecture at the presentation of the 2nd volume of the second edition of the International Encyclopedia of Systems and Cybernetics, Humboldt University, Saur Library, Berlin, 2004.
- 2012, Charles François (* 5. September 1922): 90 years of life in 9 worlds. IFSR Newsletter 2012 Vol. 29 No. 1 September
