= International Biodeterioration and Biodegradation Society =

The International Biodeterioration and Biodegradation Society (IBBS) is a scientific society with an international membership. It is a charity registered in the UK. IBBS belongs to the Federation of European Microbiological Societies (FEMS), along with national organizations from European countries and appears in the Yearbook of International Organisations On-line, published by the Union of International Associations. The aim of IBBS is to promote and spread knowledge of Biodeterioration and Biodegradation. Conferences are arranged on specific topics and every three years an International Symposium covering a wide range of research in these scientific areas is organized; the 17th International Symposium, IBBS17, was held in Manchester, UK. Members can apply for various grants or bursaries. The most recently inaugurated offers funding for inter-laboratory research worker visits. The Society's journal, International Biodeterioration and Biodegradation, is published by Elsevier.

== Aims and early history ==
The International Biodeterioration and Biodegradation Society (IBBS) is a learned scientific society with a worldwide membership coming from academia and industry. Its aims are to promote the sciences of Biodeterioraion and Biodegradation by means of international meetings, conferences and publications. It appears in the Yearbook of International Organisations On-line, published by the Union of International Associations, in cooperation with the United Nations Economic and Social Council. It began as the Biodeterioration Society. The draft constitution of the Society was agreed in 1969 and the first annual general meeting was held on 9 July 1971 . The aim of the Society was to promote the science of Biodeterioration, which is defined as any undesirable change in the properties of a material caused by the vital activities of living organisms. The economic importance of biodeterioration was discussed in an article by Dennis Allsopp, a former president and secretary of the Society. The first Biodeterioration Symposium was held prior to the inauguration of the Society, in Southampton, UK, in 1968. A copy of the abstracts is available at . The Second International Biodeterioration Symposium, and the first to be held under the auspices of the newly-formed Society, was held in Lunteren, The Netherlands, in September, 1971. The Third International Symposium, held at the University of Rhode Island, USA, in 1975, was designated the "Third International Biodegradation Symposium", this being the more recognized word in the USA. It was not until the 8th Symposium, however, in Windsor, Ontario, in 1990, that the term was reintroduced. Since then, all triennial events have been entitled "International Biodeterioration and Biodegradation Symposium" and the Society adopted the word into its name, becoming the International Biodeterioration and Biodegradation Society, or IBBS.

== Governance and publications ==
IBBS is a charity registered in the UK. It has an executive body, the Council, with elected honorary officers , which meets three times each year. The Honorary Scientific Programme Officers collaborate on the organization of conferences and small meetings suggested by members. A Newsletter is produced under the aegis of its Honorary Managing Editor and emailed to members three times each year. IBBS has no physical headquarters, any physical records and publications being kept by Council members. Back issues of the Society's first publication, International Biodeterioration Bulletin (1965-1986, now discontinued) have been converted into digital format and made freely available on the website . From 1984, the Journal was published by the Commonwealth Agricultural Bureaux (CAB) in the UK, under ISSN 0265-3036. In 1987, the Society agreed with Elsevier that the journal "International Biodeterioration and Biodegradation" (ISSN 0964-8305) would be published by them and acknowledged as the Official Journal of IBBS. Reduced subscriptions are available to IBBS members.

== Membership and meetings ==
The Society is a member of FEMS (Federation of European Microbiological Societies), but its members are not restricted to Europe. IBBS has a diverse membership with scientists and industrialists from all over the world and with approximately equal numbers of male and female members. Membership is available through the homepage; reduced subscription is available to students and applicants from low income countries. "Country Representatives" have the role of promoting IBBS in their countries and acting as a focal point for members in that area. Meetings have been held in the UK, USA, Austria, Canada, Czech Republic, France, Germany, Holland, India, Italy, Poland and Spain, with overarching international symposia held every 3 years. The 2017 triennial International Biodeterioration and Biodegradation Symposium (IBBS17) was held in Manchester, UK, in September. The 2020 Symposium was delayed because of the COVID outbreak and was held on-line in September, 2021, www.ibbs18.org. IBBS19 was held in Berlin, Germany, and the 2027 Symposium, IBBS20, is planned for Budapest in August of that year. The Society also sponsors the Latin American Biodeterioration and Biodegradation Symposia (Simposio Latino-Americano de Biodegradacao e Biodeterioracao), held approximately every 3 years in countries of Latin America. These began in Campos do Jordao, Brazil, in 1990, and have since been held in Argentina, Ecuador, Mexico and Colombia, as well as other Brazilian cities.
