= International Congress Calendar =

Calendar of events organized by non-profit international organizations

The International Congress Calendar is a calendar of events organized by non-profit international organizations, mainly those organizations which are included in the Yearbook of International Organizations. It has been published since 1960 by the Union of International Associations (UIA) and includes over 425,000 meetings. Over 15,000 new meetings are included every year.

It is one of the most comprehensive sources of information on future international meetings organized or sponsored by international organizations. All information is provided, or confirmed, by the organizations themselves.

The Calendar is published in print and online

== See also ==
- Yearbook of International Organizations
- Union of International Associations
- International Congress Calendar, Series 9, 1955-2017, Union of International Associations records. DIMES: The Online Collection and Catalog of Rockefeller Archive Center (RAC).
- Encyclopedia of World Problems and Human Potential
- Anthony Judge
