= Fegime =

FEGIME, or Fédération Européenne des Grossistes Indépendants en Matériel Electrique (European Federation of Independent Electrical Wholesalers) is an international group comprising 19 National Organisations and more than 260 independent electrical wholesalers in 28 countries in Europe, South America and the Middle East.

It is affiliated with the Union of International Associations.
