= G. A. Swanson =

American organizational theorist

- Born: George Alden Swanson; January 12, 1939; Lemmon, South Dakota, U.S.
- Died: July 3, 2009 (aged 70); Cleveland, Tennessee, U.S.
- Education: Lee University (BA); University of Tennessee (MA); Georgia State University (PhD)
- Occupations: Educator; accountant
- Years active: 1982–2009
- Employer: Tennessee Technological University
- Spouse: Treasure
- Children: 3

Gale Alden (G.A.) Swanson (Jan 12, 1939 - July 3, 2009) was an American organizational theorist, and Professor of Accounting at Tennessee Technological University, known for his accounting theories based on James Grier Miller’s general living systems theory.

== Early life ==
Gale Alden Swanson was born in Lemmon, South Dakota, on January 12, 1939, to Freda (née Wolff) and George H.A. Swanson. He received a BA with honors from Lee University in Cleveland, Tennessee, in 1969, a Master of Arts in college teaching from the University of Tennessee, Knoxville in 1970 and a Ph.D. from the Georgia State University in 1982. In his PhD thesis he had developed the outlines for a "general theory of accounting" which was largely inspired in Miller’s the living systems theory.

== Career ==
Since 1982, he was a professor of accounting at Tennessee Tech in its Department of Accounting and Business Law. Also he was serving on editorial boards of Systems Research and Behavioral Science, Systems-Journal of Transdisciplinary Systems Science, Journal for Information Systems and Systems Approach and International Encyclopedia of Systems and Cybernetics. Swanson is a former president of International Society for the Systems Sciences in 1997. He was founder of the Tennessee Society of Accounting Educators, and former council member of the TSCPA Educational Foundation.

He also served on the faculty of Roane State Community College, Lee University, Southwest Minnesota State University and the University of West Georgia.

Swanson received several awards. In 1989-90 he was awarded an Institute of Internal Auditors Research Foundation Fellowship, in 1991 a D.Litt. at the Oxford Graduate School, in 1997 a College of Business Administration Excellence in Overall Performance Award, and a College of Business Administration Foundation Award for Outstanding Research in 1987, 1993, and 2004.

He was actively teaching during the semester prior to his death, and retired from Tennessee Tech in early June 2009.

== Personal life ==
Swanson was married to Treasure Swanson. Together, they had 3 children: Connie, George, and Nolan.

== Death ==
Swanson died on July 3, 2009, in Cleveland, Tennessee.

== Publications ==
Swanson has published several books and numerous scholarly articles. A selection:

- 1989. Measurement and interpretation in accounting : a living systems theory approach. With James Grier Miller. New York : Quorum Books
- 1991. Internal auditing theory : a systems view. With Hugh L. Marsh. New York : Quorum Books
- 1992. Management observation and communication theory. With Heikki Heiskanen.
- 1993. Macro accounting and modern money supplies. Westport, Conn. : Quorum Books
