= Q-analysis =

Q-analysis is a mathematical framework to describe and analyze set systems, or equivalently simplicial complexes. This idea was first introduced by Ronald Atkin in the early 1970s. Atkin was a British mathematician teaching at the University of Essex. Crediting the inspiration of his idea to Clifford Dowker's paper (Homology Groups of Relations, Annals of Mathematics, 1952), he became interested in the algebra of relations in social structures. He tried to explain his idea in both mathematical and also accessible forms to both technical and general audience. His main ideas are reflected in The Mathematical Structure of Human Affairs (1974). That book covers the key ideas in q-analysis and its application to a wide range of examples, like analyzing game of chess, urban structures, politics at university, people and complexes, works of abstract art, and to physics. He contended that q-analysis can be considered as a powerful generalized method wherever we are dealing with relationships among sets.

== Description ==
A simplex of n vertices can be represented as a polyhedron in n − 1 dimensions, so that for example a triangle of three vertices can be drawn on a plane of two dimensions and is accordingly called a 2-simplex. When simplices share vertices, the intersections of their vertex sets are themselves simplices of equal or lower dimension. For example, two triangles with two vertices in common share not only the two 0-simplex vertices but the 1-simplex line between them. The triangles are said to be both 1- and 0-connected because they share 1- and 0-dimensional faces.

Q-analysis of a simplicial complex consists in stepping through all q up to the dimension of the largest simplex and constructing for each q a graph of the simplices that are q-connected at each level, and in particular, determining how many connected components are present for each q.

Q-analysis can thus provide a rich summary of (literally) multi-faceted relationships between entities.

== Applications ==
- Analysis of large-scale systems structure
- Analysis of social network
- Decision making

== See also ==
- Systems theory
- Living systems theory
