= Encyclopedia of World Problems and Human Potential =

Online encyclopedia

- Cover of the first 1976 edition
- Author: Editorial team
- Language: English
- Subject: Humankind problems and solutions
- Genre: Encyclopedia
- Publisher: Union of International Associations
- Publication date: 1976–present
- Publication place: Belgium
- Media type: Print from 1976 to 1995, CD-ROM in 1995, online since 2000

The Encyclopedia of World Problems and Human Potential (EWPHP) is a research work published by the Union of International Associations (UIA). It is available online since 2000, and was previously available as a CD-ROM and as a three-volume book.

The EWPHP began under the direction of Anthony Judge in 1972 and eventually came to comprise more than 100,000 entries and 700,000 links, as well as hundreds of pages of introductory notes and commentaries on problems, strategies, values, concepts of human development, and various intellectual resources.

== Contributors and history ==
The project was originally conceived in 1972 by James Wellesley-Wesley, who provided financial support through the foundation Mankind 2000, and Anthony Judge, by whom the work was orchestrated.

Work on the first edition started with funds from Mankind 2000, matching those of the UIA. The publisher Klaus Saur, of Munich, provided funds, in conjunction with those from the UIA, for work on the 2nd, 3rd, and 4th editions. Seed funding for the third volume of the 4th edition was also provided on behalf of Mankind 2000. In the nineties, seed funding was provided, again on behalf of Mankind 2000, for computer equipment which subsequently allowed the UIA to develop a website and make available for free the 1994–1995 edition of the EWPHP databases. The UIA, on the initiative of Nadia McLaren, a consultant ecologist who has been a primary editor for the EWPHP, instigated two multi-partner projects funded by the European Union, with matching funds from the UIA. The work done through those two projects, Ecolynx: Information Context for Biodiversity Conservation (mainly) and Interactive Health Ecology Access Links, resulted in a fifth, web-based edition of the EWPHP in 2000. Two other individuals supported the project: Robert Jungk of Mankind 2000, and Christian de Laet of the UIA.

EWPHP began as a processing of documents gathered from entities profiled in the Yearbook of International Organizations. The United Nations Library in Geneva facilitated access to other material over two decades. At one point, the Institute of Cultural Affairs International was contractually associated. The Goals, Processes and Indicators of Development project was led by Johan Galtung of the United Nations University, in conjunction with Anthony Judge.

The principal editors of the EWPHP's editions have been Jon Jenkins, Maureen Jenkins, Owen Victor, Jacqueline Nebel, Nadia McLaren, and Tomáš Fülöpp. In 2005, following disagreement over the partnership contract, Anthony Judge, in his role as executive secretary of Mankind 2000, reframed the EWPHP as having been a strategic initiative of the Union of Intelligible Associations.

Tomáš Fülöpp maintained the EWPHP databases at the UIA until sometime after January 2012. Tomáš Fülöpp also acts as manager along with senior editors Nadia McLaren and Kimberly Trathen.

Cover of the 1995 CD-ROM

=== Editions ===
- The 1st edition, initiated in 1972 and published in 1976, has one volume entitled Yearbook of World Problems and Human Potential, comprising thirteen sections, several of which have not appeared in subsequent editions.
- The 2nd edition, initiated in 1983 and published in 1986, was titled Encyclopedia of World Problems and Human Potential. It is still a single volume (published as volume 4 of the Yearbook of International Organizations), but with different sections due to the variegated types of paper used in printing the edition. The book is equivalent to several normal volumes. According to Edward Cornish of The Futurist, one such book is equivalent to 40 or 50 normal-sized books.
- The 3rd edition, initiated in 1988 and published in 1991, has two volumes: World Problems (vol. 1), and Human Potential (vol. 2).
- The 4th edition, initiated in 1992 and again in 1994–1995, has three volumes: World Problems (vol. 1), Human Potential – Transformation and Values (vol.2), Actions – Strategies – Solutions (vol. 3). A CD-ROM version, Encyclopedia Plus, is also published.
- The online edition was initiated in 1997 and completed in 2000.

	1st edition 1976	2nd edition 1986	3rd edition 1991	4th edition 1994-5	Online edition 2000
World Problems	7,444	10,233	13,167	12,203	56,564
Human Development	288	1,596	4,051	4,456	4,817
Values	704	2,270	2,270	3,254	3,257
Strategies	0	8,335	0	29,542	32,547

== Critical reception ==
There have been several reviews of the EWPHP. One of the criticisms came from the American Library Association in 1987: "The board considers the Encyclopedia of World Problems and Human Potential a problematic monument to idiosyncrasy, confusion, and obfuscation that certainly is not worth purchasing at any price." Similarly, The Guardian was critical in a review article published in 1992. The Wall Street Journal published a review of the EWPHP initiative in December 2012.

== See also ==
- Decision making
- Environmental issue
- Global governance
- Policy
- Political issue
- Problem solving
- Public policy
- Social issue
- Wicked problem
