= John Pourdehnad =

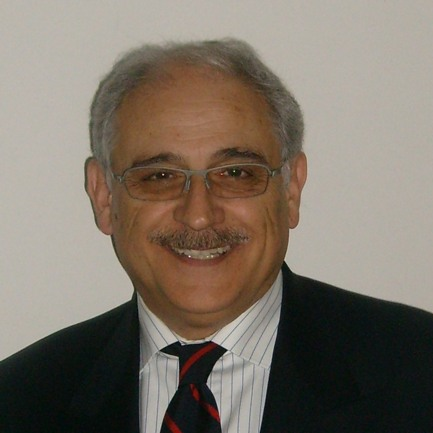
John Pourdehnad, Ph.D.

John Pourdehnad (born 1950) is an American organizational theorist, and consultant. He is associate director of the Ackoff Center for Advancement of Systems Approaches (ACASA), and Affiliated Faculty in the Organizational Dynamics Graduate Program at the University of Pennsylvania.

== Biography ==
John Pourdehnad graduated in 1971 from the Brunel University, Uxbridge, Middlesex, England as B.S. in Mechanical and Production Engineering. He received a Ph.D. in Social Systems Sciences at the University of Pennsylvania.

In 1971 he started his career in British Leyland in Lancashire, England as Design Engineer. After one year he joined General Industrial Group in Teheran, Iran as Vice-President responsible for Manufacturing. After that he became Senior Consultant and project Manager in the Industrial Management Institute of Iran. For a short period he returned to the commercial setting in 1978–1979 as a President of Systems Development Company, called "Micro-Data", in Teheran.

In 1980 he becomes a System Research Associate and Project Manager in the Busch Center of The Wharton School in the University of Pennsylvania, Philadelphia. Since 2000 he has been a Professor and Associate Director of the Ackoff Center for Advancement of Systems Approaches (A-CASA) which is a part of the Department of Electrical and Systems Engineering in the same university.

Since 1979, John Pourdehnad, mostly as associate of Russell Ackoff, worked as a consultant in a broad range of industries including aerospace, chemicals, computer equipment, data services and software, electronics, energy, food and beverages, healthcare, hospitality, industrial equipment, automotive, insurance, metals, mining, pharmaceuticals, telecommunications, utilities, and transportation.

John Pourdehnad is a Member of the Editorial Board, Systems Research and Behavioral Science Journal, a John Wiley Publication and Member of the Academy of Management and journal of Problems of Governance, Tomsk State University, Russia. He is an honorary member of the Society for Organizational Excellence.

== Work ==
John Pourdehnad in seminar

John Pourdehnad, Ph.D.

Pourdehnad primary areas of interest include implications of systems thinking in complex problem formulation, including complex project management, and systems redesign, knowledge development in creation of new products and services, and the development of socio-technical systems for learning and knowledge-to-wisdom management in complex adaptive systems.

== Publications ==
Pourdehnad has written and edited a book and several articles and papers.

- 1993. Internal markets : bringing the power of free enterprise inside your organization. With William E. Halal and Ali Geranmayeh. Foreword by Russell L. Ackoff. New York : Wiley, 1993.
- 2005. Social Influence And Climate Change: Entertainment And Advertising. Instruments For Exploring The Training And Aesthetic Dimensions Of Edutainment: Case of the Heart Sense Game. With Barry Silverman at al. Technical Report. 2005, University of Pennsylvania, Philadelphia, PA.

Selected Articles and papers

- 1995. "From Downsizing to Rightsizing to Selfsizing". With William Halal and Erwin Rausch. In: Total Quality Review, July/August 1995.
- 1997. "The Irresponsibility and Ineffectiveness of Downsizing". With Russell L. Ackoff. In: Systems Practice, Vol. 10, No.1 1997.
- 1999. "What Drives Organizational Learning at GM?" With Wendy Coles. In: Handbook of Business Strategy, Faulkner & Gray, 1999.
- 2000. "Building Corporate ‘Black Boxes’: A Different Perspective on Organizational Learning." In: Proceedings, International Conference on Systems Thinking in Management, Deakin University, Geelong, Victoria, Australia, November 2000.
- 2000. "On Misdirected Systems". With Russell L. Ackoff. In: Systems Research and Behavioral Science. Vol 18, Issue 3, May/June 2001, Pp: 199-205.
- 2001. "Systems Approach to Knowledge Development for Creating New Products and Services". With Patrick Robinson. In: Systems Research and Behavioral Science Vol 18, 1, January/February 2001, pp 29–40.
- 2002. "Beyond Knowledge Management". With Vince Barabba and Russell Ackoff. In: The Strategic Management of Intellectual Capital and Organizational Knowledge: A Collection of Readings, Oxford University Press, New York, 2002.
- 2002. "Redesigning the Academy of Vocal Arts (AVA)". With Adele Hebb. In: Systems Research and Behavioral Science Vol 19, Issue 4.
- 2002. "Re-Creating the Capital Project: A Social Systemic Approach". With Mark Steele. In: Proceedings, the 2nd International Conference on Systems Thinking in Management, April, 2002, University of Salford, Salford, UK.
- 2002. "System Dynamics and Intelligent Agent-Based Simulation: Where is the Synergy?". With Kambiz Maani and Habib Sedehi. In: Proceedings for the Twentieth International Conference of the System Dynamics Society, July 28 – August 1, 2002, Palermo, Italy.
- 2004. "Systems Thinking and Its Implications in Organizational Transformation". With Gnana Bharathy. In: Proceedings for the 3rd International Conference on Systems Thinking in Management. May, 2004, University of Pennsylvania, Philadelphia, PA.
- 2005. "User Interface Design -- An Experimental Study." With Barry Silverman et al. In: Proceedings for the American Society For Cybernetics (ASC) 2005 Conference. October 2005, The George Washington University, Washington, D.C.
- 2006. "Social Systems Simulation For Group Learning: Adding Realism To Modeling," With Gnana Bharathy et al.. In: Systems Thinking and Complexity Science: Insights for Action. A Volume in ISCE Publishing's Complex Systems Series. 2006 ISCE Publishing, Mansfield, MA.
- 2006. "Unlearning/Learning Organizations – The Role of Mindset". With Bruce Warren, Maureen Wright and John Mairano. In: Proceedings of the 50th Annual Meeting of the International Society for the Systems Sciences. Sonoma State University, Sonoma, CA.
- 2006. "Individual Consumer Differences and Design Implications for Web-Based Decision Support" (with Barry Silverman et al.), Ackoff Center for the Advancement of Systems Approaches (ACASA), University of Pennsylvania. Submitted for Publication to Erg Soc. J of Behavior and Info Tech.
- 2007. "Synthetic (Integrative) Project Management" Business Strategy Series, Volume 8, Issue 8, Page: 426 – 434, Emerald Publications, New York, NY.
- 2009. "A Useful Distinction Between Managers and Leaders" (with Russell L. Ackoff), Strategy and Leadership, 2009, Volume 37, Issue 3, Emerald Publications, New York, NY.
- 2011. "Systems & Design Thinking: A Conceptual Framework for Their Integration" (with Erica R. Wexler, and Dennis V. Wilson), Organizational Dynamics Working Papers, Working Paper #11-03 and Proceedings of the 55th Annual Meeting of the International Society for the Systems Sciences
- 2012. "Sustainability, organizational learning, and lessons learned from aviation" (with Peter A.C. Smith), Learning Organization, The, Vol. 19 Iss: 1, pp. 77–86.
- 2012. "Translational Consulting," Ongoing Discussion "thought Piece," Pratt & Whitney Rocketdyne's InThinking Network, September 2012, http://www.in2in.org/od/thought/2012-09-ThoughtPiece-Pourdehnad.pdf
- Starr, Larry M. (December 2014). "Rethinking Executive Education: A Program for Responding to Sudden Disruptions Caused by Dynamic Complexity". repository.upenn.edu. Archived from the original on January 20, 2015.
