= F-Law =

Management f-Laws are subversive epigrams about common management practices. Based on observation and experience, they are used to draw attention to entrenched ways of thinking about management and business that are often at odds with common sense or our actual experience.

Systems theorist Russell L. Ackoff, his co-author Herbert J. Addison and Sally Bibb invented the term in 2006 to describe their series of over 100 distilled observations of bad leadership and the misplaced wisdom that often surrounds management in organizations. Ackoff and Addison's f-Laws might seem counter-intuitive. They are designed to challenge organizations' unquestioning adherence to established management habits or beliefs. Many of the f-Laws describe a relationship of inverse proportionality, in example: "The lower the rank of managers, the more they know about fewer things."

The f-Laws advocate adopting a positive, forward-looking and interactive approach to structural or systematic change within organizations, following the principles of idealized design. This is a process that "involves redesigning the organization on the assumption that it was destroyed last night... The most effective way of creating the future is by closing or reducing the gap between the current state and the idealized design".

Three collections of f-Laws entitled A Little Book of f-Laws: 13 Common Sins of Management, Management f-Laws: How Organizations Really Work and Systems Thinking for Curious Managers have been published. While, if read in isolation, each f-Law is a witty and thought-provoking axiom, the books provide a context that draws upon systems thinking and the debate over the importance of developing soft skills in business environments.
