= Yong Pil Rhee =

South Korean social scientist (1933-2004)

Yong Pil Rhee (December 10, 1932 – March 23, 2004) was a Korean political scientist, systems scientist and professor and chairman of the board of trustees at the Seoul National University, South Korea. He was one of the first systems theorists, who demonstrated that the system is dynamic and experiences change.

== Biography ==
Yong Pil Rhee received a B.A. from Yonsei University in 1957, and a M.A. in 1959. He was a professor at Konkuk University however decided to continue his education abroad. In 1968 he received a M.A. from Northwestern University, and in 1974 a PhD. from the University of Chicago under David Easton with the thesis "Breakdown of Authority Structure in Korea in 1960: A Systems Approach", a case study of the failure of concerted feedback.

He became professor at the Seoul National University later in 1979. In the mid-1990s Rhee also worked for the International Systems Institute.

Yong Pil Rhee served as the president of the Korean Society for Systems Science Research, the International Society for the Systems Sciences (1996), and the International Federation for Systems Research (IFSR) from 1998 to 2002. He was also a member of the editorial board of the journal Systems Research and Behavioral Science, and of the International Advisory Board of the "Systems Thinking: Four-Volume Set": a systems science reference for all libraries of business, management and organization studies.

== Publications ==
Rhee wrote several books, articles and papers. A selection:

- 1982. Breakdown of Authority Structure in Korea in 1960: A Systems Approach . Univ of Hawaii.
- 1996. Complex systems model of South-North Korean integration. Edited. Seoul : Seoul National University Press.
- 1997. Systems Thinking, Globalization of Knowledge, and Communitarian Ethics. Edited with Kenneth D. Bailey. Proceedings of the International Society for the Systems Sciences International Conference. Seoul, Korea.
- 1998. Complexity of Korean Unification Process: System Approach. Seoul: Seoul National University Press,
- 1999. Dynamics and Complexity of Political System. Seoul, Korea:. Ingansarang Press.
- 2003. Chaos and order through fluctuations in global capitalism in the twenty-first century (Abstract)
