= Social entropy =

Disorder analysis in sociocultural systems

Social entropy is a sociological theory that evaluates social behaviours using a method based on the second law of thermodynamics. The equivalent of entropy in a social system is considered to be wealth or residence location. The term "social entropy" was first used by physicist Peter Tait in 1874. The theory was introduced by Kenneth D. Bailey in 1990 and extended recently by Roumen Tsekov, who related social entropy to liberty and economic freedom.

== See also ==
- Social dynamics
