= Stuart Umpleby =

American cybernetician

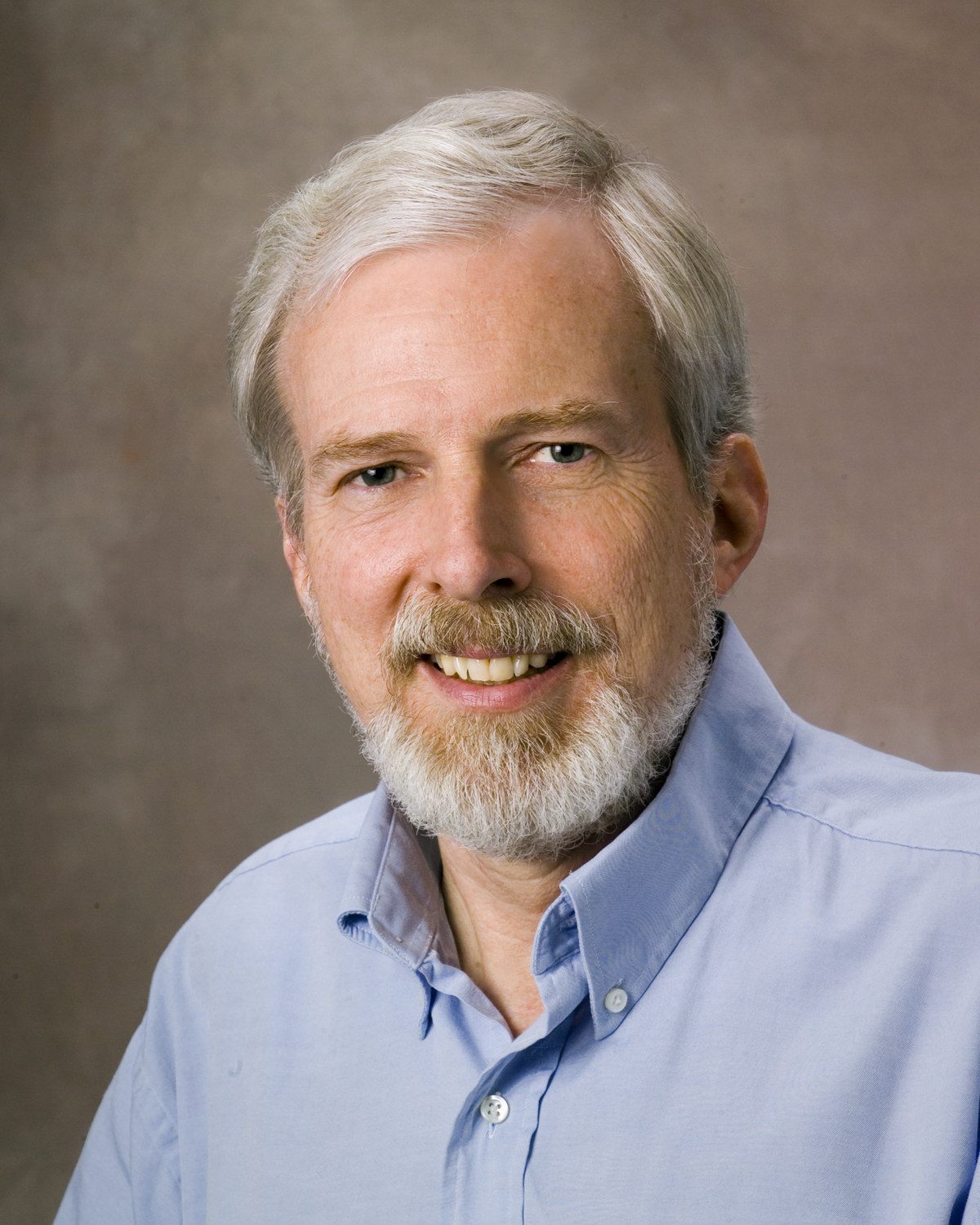
Stuart A. Umpleby, 2006

Stuart Anspach Umpleby (born March 5, 1944) is an American cybernetician and professor in the Department of Management and Director of the Research Program in Social and Organizational Learning in the School of Business at the George Washington University.

== Biography ==
Umpleby attended the University of Illinois Urbana-Champaign where he received degrees in engineering in 1967, in political science in 1967 and in 1969, and a PhD in communications in 1975.

In the 1960s, while a student at the University of Illinois, Umpleby worked in the Institute of Communications Research, The Biological Computer Laboratory, and the Computer-based Education Research Laboratory, the PLATO system. From 1967 to 1975 he and other students developed computer conferencing systems and other applications for time shared computers.

After moving to George Washington University, he was the moderator from 1977 to 1980, of a computer conference on general systems theory supported by the National Science Foundation. Between 1982 and 1988 he arranged scientific meetings involving American and Soviet scientists in the area of cybernetics and general systems theory.

From 1975 to present he has been a professor in the Department of Management at The George Washington University, where he teaches courses ranging from cybernetics, systems theory, and system dynamics to the philosophy of science, cross-cultural management, and organizational behavior. From 1994 to 1997 he was the faculty facilitator of a Quality and Innovation Initiative in the GW School of Business.

He is a past president of the American Society for Cybernetics (ASC). In 2007 Stuart Umpleby was awarded The Wiener Gold Medal of the American Society for Cybernetics. In 2010 he was elected an Academician in the International Academy for Systems and Cybernetic Sciences, an honor society created by the International Federation for Systems Research. He is twice divorced and has two sons.

== Work ==
Umpleby's research interests are in the fields of cybernetics and systems theory, the philosophy of science, and management methods. Other interests have been demography, the year 2000 computer crisis, academic globalization, and the transitions in the post-communist countries.

=== Cybernetics ===
In the early 1970s Umpleby studied cybernetics with Heinz von Foerster and Ross Ashby in the Biological Computer Laboratory at the University of Illinois Urbana-Champaign. With Heinz von Foerster and Leo Steg he organized the first Gordon Research Conference on cybernetics in 1984. He worked to develop and promote second-order cybernetics or biological cybernetics. He also helped to create social cybernetics. He provided an example of the amplification of management capability. He clarified the nature of information in descriptions of the physical relationships among matter, energy, and information. And he has pointed out that George Soros's reflexivity theory is quite compatible with cybernetics.

=== Philosophy of science ===
Following his work on biological cybernetics and social cybernetics Umpleby suggested a way of unifying the philosophies of realism, constructivism, and pragmatism by combining world, description, and observer. Building on the work of E.A. Singer, Jr., C. West Churchman, and Russell L. Ackoff, Umpleby has suggested that, since managers are part of the system they seek to influence, methods rather than theories are more effective ways to present knowledge of management.

=== Management methods ===
Umpleby recently has worked to further develop the Quality Improvement Priority Matrix, a method for determining priorities for improvement and for monitoring perceived improvement.

=== Demography ===
In 1960 Heinz von Foerster published an article in Science showing that if demographic trends of the past two millennia continue, world population would go to infinity in approximately 2026. Although contested in the 1960s, the equation proved remarkably accurate, indeed even conservative, until the early 1990s. Discussions of the doomsday equation revealed that demographers and natural scientists have fundamentally different ways of dealing with estimates and that these differences are not generally known by the public, science journalists, or other scientists.

=== Year 2000 computer problem ===
From 1997 to 2000 Umpleby worked on the Year 2000 Computer Problem, viewing it as an opportunity to test social science theories using a before and after research design.

=== Academic globalization ===
Between 1977 and 1980 he was the moderator of a computer conference on general systems theory supported by the National Science Foundation. This project was one of nine "experimental trials of electronic information exchange for small research communities". About sixty scientists in the United States, Canada, and Europe interacted for a period of two and a half years using the Electronic Information Exchange System (EIES) located at New Jersey Institute of Technology. Continuing the work with computer-based communications media, Umpleby has experimented with applications of the internet. Currently he is developing the idea of academic globalization, since it is now possible for academics to collaborate via the internet with colleagues in foreign countries for purposes of education, research or community service.

=== Transitions in post-communist countries ===
With the collapse of communism in 1989 many social scientists both in Russia and the West said that, although Karl Marx had described the transition from capitalism to socialism to communism, there were no theories to guide the transition from communism to capitalism. Umpleby refuted this claim by organizing meetings in 1990 in both Washington, DC, and Vienna, Austria, to discuss the theories of economic, political, and social development that can guide the transformation of socialist societies.

Since 1994 the Research Program in Social and Organizational Learning at The George Washington University, which Umpleby heads, has hosted over 150 visiting scholars supported by the U.S. Department of State. Most of these scholars have come from the former Soviet Union and Southeast Europe. While on campus the scholars work with professors in their fields. They also learn process improvement and group facilitation methods, so they can be more effective in introducing changes when they return home. In this way Umpleby has experimented with ways to encourage the use of participatory methods in other countries. He has found that the Participatory Strategic Planning methods developed by the Institute of Cultural Affairs not only improve the effectiveness of organizations but also lead to more humane management practices and build mutual trust among the participants.

=== International Academy for Systems and Cybernetic Sciences ===
Umpleby has been an Academician in the International Academy for Systems and Cybernetic Sciences, an honor society created by the International Federation for Systems Research, since 2010.

== Publications ==
Stuart Umpleby has written numerous articles, edited several special issues of the journal Cybernetics and Systems, and edited two books:

- 1991. Stuart Umpleby and Vadim Sadovsky (eds.). A Science of Goal Formulation, Taylor & Francis, 255 pages.
- 2018. Alexander Reigler, Karl H. Mueller, and Stuart A. Umpleby (eds.), New Horizons for Second-Order Cybernetics, World Scientific, 388 pages.

Articles and papers, a selection

- 1983. "A Group Process Approach to Organizational Change." in Horst Wedde (ed.), Adequate Modeling of Systems, Springer-Verlag, pp. 116–128.
- 1986. "Methods for Making Social Organizations Adaptive." in Robert Trappl (ed.) Power, Autonomy, Utopia: New Approaches toward Complex Systems, Plenum Publishing, pp. 133–138.
- 1987. "ASC Glossary on Cybernetics and Systems Theory". By Stuart Umpleby (ed.) from the American Society for Cybernetics.
- 1990. "The Science of Cybernetics and the Cybernetics of Science". In: Cybernetics and Systems. Vol 21/1: 109–121.
- 1999. "The Origins and Purposes of Several Traditions in Systems Theory and Cybernetics". With Eric B. Dent (1999). In: Cybernetics and Systems: An International Journal, 30:79-103, 1999.

== See also ==
- Conceptual system
- Cyberneticist
- Glossary of systems theory
- Management cybernetics
- Mental Health Research Institute (Michigan)
- Second-Order Cybernetics
- Russell L. Ackoff
- Principia Cybernetica
- The Institute of Cultural Affairs International
- Constructivist Foundations
