= Anthony Judge =

Australian encyclopedist

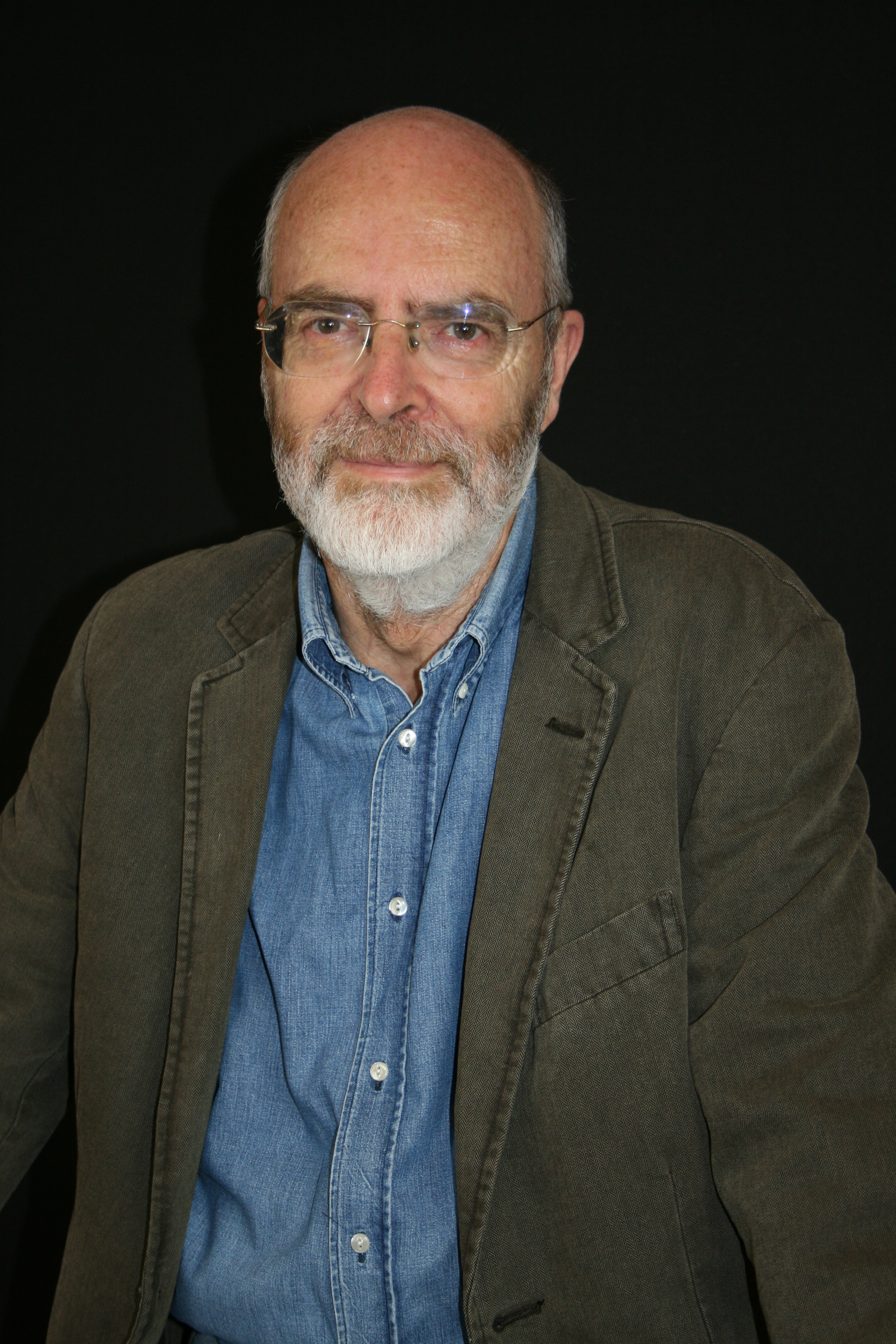
Anthony Judge

Anthony Judge, (Port Said, 21 January 1940) is mainly known for his career at the Union of International Associations (UIA), where he has been Director of Communications and Research, as well as Assistant Secretary-General. He was responsible at the UIA for the development of interlinked databases and for publications based on those databases, mainly the Encyclopedia of World Problems and Human Potential, the Yearbook of International Organizations, and the International Congress Calendar. Judge has also personally authored a collection of over 1,600 documents of relevance to governance and strategy-making. All these papers are freely available on his personal website Laetus in Praesens. Now retired from the UIA, he is continuing his research within the context of an initiative called Union of Imaginable Associations.

== Early life ==
Anthony John Nesbitt (Tony) Judge, an Australian national, was born in Port Said, Egypt, in 1940. His father was a pilot and officer in the Royal Air Force. He was brought up in what was Rhodesia (now Zimbabwe), with some schooling in the United Kingdom and Australia. He did chemical engineering at Imperial College (London) and an MBA at the University of Cape Town. He worked at the Union of International Associations between 1961 and 1963, and from 1968 till 2007. He is still living in Belgium, his wife is German, and they have one son.

== Career ==
Anthony Judge's work at the UIA, from the sixties until 2007, involved the adaptation of a wide range of emerging technologies to data management and knowledge management, such as in-house computers, computer typesetting, email, extension of email access to developing countries, metadata structure, collaborative editing, Machine translation, web technology, VRML, and inter-institutional data integration. A particular focus of his activities was on the possibilities of visualizing networks of organizations, world problems and other sets of data.

His work also involved the production of many research papers relevant to the strategic position of international organizations and the organized response to world problems. He wrote papers for instance on dialogue facilitation, transformative conferencing, information system design, relevance of metaphor for governance and communication, transdisciplinarity, and concepts of human development.

Under Judge's direction the UIA developed the most extensive databases on global civil society and its networks. Those databases contain entries on international nonprofit bodies (61,000+), biography profiles (24,000+), international meetings (240,000+, past and future), world problems (56,000+), global strategies (32,000+), concepts of human development (4,800+), human values (3,300+), and more. Additionally, the number of links between different entries in the databases reaches over 2,000,000. Publications based on those databases include the Encyclopedia of World Problems and Human Potential, the Yearbook of International Organizations, the International Congress Calendar, and many other.

Judge carried out also consulting and related activities with such institutions as the United Nations Institute for Training and Research (UNITAR), UNESCO, UN Environment Programme (UNEP), UN University (Tokyo), and the Commonwealth Science Council. One of his continuing research interests has been innovation in international meeting processes, especially in conferences with special problems. He thus played advisory and facilitatory roles in several events such as Inter-Sectoral Dialogue (Rio de Janeiro, 1992), World Futures Studies Conference (Turku, 1993), and Parliament of the World's Religions (Chicago, 1993).

== Encyclopedia of World Problems and Human Potential ==
The Encyclopedia of World Problems and Human Potential, of which Anthony Judge has been the main architect, is a monumental work that came into being thanks to a partnership between the UIA and Mankind 2000. Initiated in 1972, that collaborative project gave rise to a succession of editions of the Encyclopedia in 1976, 1986, 1990, and 1995, while in 2000 a new edition was made available as a collection of online databases through the UIA website. In 2005, following disagreement over the partnership contract, and as Executive Secretary of Mankind 2000, Judge reframed the Encyclopedia as having been a strategic initiative of the Union of Intelligible Associations.

Richard Slaughter, in a review article, praised in particular the Encyclopedia introductory and commentary texts (available online), which were mainly written by Judge himself. Slaughter emphasized that the significance of this work is not its size or the scope of its tens of thousands of references, impressive though these are. It is rather in the nature of what has been attempted. Those numerous accompanying texts, he said, are good enough to be published separately because they contain highly cogent observations on the "global problematique", commentaries on the work of numerous great thinkers from a wide variety of fields, and an impressive array of insights about the epistemology, symbolism, metaphysics, metaphors and linguistic representations of the subject.

== Writings ==
Over the years Judge has produced more than 1,600 papers on information, knowledge organization, and other topics of relevance to governance, policy and strategy-making. Most of these papers are freely available on his personal website Laetus in Praesens (translated from Latin: Joy in the Present), where they are listed by themes and dates. Many of them evolve around the quest to create a wiser and more functional world, especially in the perspective of learning from the relative lack of success of past initiatives in view of the dimensions and urgency of challenges. His work has a high level of novelty, for instance innovation in the use of metaphors, art, poetry, debate, data-visualization and system structures. The exploratory interdisciplinary methodology of futures studies, with which Judge has long been associated, also significantly gives form to his whole, unique, work.

Now retired from the UIA, Anthony Judge is continuing to write within the context of an initiative called Union of Imaginable Associations, and its associated projects.
