= Linda Olds =

American psychologist

Linda E. Olds (born 1946) is an American psychologist, consultant, trainer, Emeritus professor at Linfield College and pioneer in the field of systems psychology.

== Biography ==
Linda Olds studied clinical psychology and community psychology and received a B.A. at the Oberlin College in 1968, an M.A. in 1970 from the University of Cincinnati, and a Ph.D. in 1976 at the University of Cincinnati. Later she did postdoctoral research at the Pacific School of Religion and UC Berkeley in 1987. She was a research fellow at the Institute for the Advanced Study of Religion, University of Chicago Divinity School in 1981, and at the National Endowment for the Humanities Summer Seminar, at Yale University in 1991.

After studying at the University of Cincinnati in 1976 she worked several years as a counseling consulting and trainer at the University of Cincinnati Counseling Center, the Rollman Psychiatric Institute, at the Community Psychology Institute, the Children's Psychiatric Center in Cincinnati and at the Gestalt Institute of Cleveland. In 2008 she retired as professor of psychology after 33 years of service.

She is a member of the Western Psychology Association, the Association of Women in Psychology, and the American Academy of Religion. And she has been an invited speaker at the Washington State University, the Alaska Pacific University, the University of Oregon, and Reed College, and the Mary McConnell Symposium on Religion and Science.

== Work ==
Linda Olds' principal research interests derive from the fields of personality, cross-cultural, theoretical, philosophical, and trans-personal psychology. Her interests have focused on systems theory, models of self, and gender issues in psychology.

== Publications ==
Olds wrote two books and published several articles in interdisciplinary journals like Soundings, Listening, Contemporary Philosophy, Perspectives in Biology and Medicine, and Issues in Integrative Studies.

- 1981, Fully Human, Prentice-Hall.
- 1992, Metaphors of Interrelatedness, State University of New York Press.

Articles, a selection:

- 2006, "The Columbia Basin as a Metaphor for an Interdisciplinary Approach", in: Issues in integrative studies, No. 19, pp. 221–225.
