= Jamshid Gharajedaghi =

Iranian-American business theorist (1938–2026)

Jamshid Gharajedaghi (Persian: جمشید قراچه‌داغی; February 13, 1938 – May 30, 2026) was an Iranian-American organizational theorist, management consultant and academic who was Adjunct Professor of Social System Sciences at The Wharton School of the University of Pennsylvania and Villanova University. He is known for his work in systems thinking, managing complexity, and business architecture.

== Early life and education ==
Gharajedaghi was born on February 13, 1938 in Tabriz, Iran. The youngest of three children, his early childhood was quickly marred by the 1941 Anglo-Soviet invasion of Iran and his father's sudden passing.

He attended Alborz High School in Tehran before earning his BA in Mechanical Engineering from the University of California, Berkeley in 1963.

== Career ==
After his graduation, Gharajedaghi started his career as Systems Engineer for the IBM World Trade Corporation. He was subsequently named Managing Director of the Industrial Management Institute (IMI) in 1969 and was a member of board of trustees for Azad University from 1976 to 1979.

Working across both the public and private sectors, the Institute advised major organizations, helped develop managerial and policy talent, and contributed to the intellectual and organizational foundations of Iran's rapid modernization.

Following the Iranian Revolution, Gharajedaghi emigrated to the United States and became Director of Busch Research Center, and Adjunct Professor of Systems at the Wharton School of the University of Pennsylvania.

He left the University to become managing director at the Interact, Institute for interactive design, and in 1999 Adjunct Professor of Systems thinking at the Villanova University School of Business.

He had two children, Jeyran and Marjan Gharajedaghi, the latter with two children Nader and Leyli Granmayeh.

His research interests have evolved from his "early training in information systems ... to operations research, behavioral sciences, and finally, for the last 25 years to the development design thinking as the third generation of systems thinking."

== Death ==
Gharajedaghi died at his home in New York City, on May 30, 2026, at the age of 88.

== Work ==
=== Modeling of social systems ===
In the 1988 article "Mechanisms, organisms and social systems" Gharajedaghi and Ackoff argue, that there is a fundamental flaw in the traditional way to think about social systems. They argued:

To think about anything requires an image or concept of it, a model. To think about a thing as complex as a social system most people use a model of something similar, simpler and more familiar. Traditionally, two types of models have been used in efforts to acquire information, knowledge and understanding of social systems: mechanistic and organismic. But, in a world of accelerating change, increasing uncertainty and growing complexity, it is becoming apparent that these are inadequate as guides to decision and action. The growing number of social crises and dilemmas that we face should be clear evidence that something is fundamentally wrong with the way we think about social systems.

In their paper they have tried to describe and explain

the deficiencies of the two traditional ways of thinking about social systems. We then develop a third type of model, one we believe does not suffer from these inadequacies, a social system model which seeks to penetrate beyond the nature of machine and organisms to understand social systems in their own right.

=== Systems thinking ===
Gharajedaghi presented his work as third generation of systems thinking. In the first chapter of his 1999 book "Systems thinking" he explains his point of view:

The analytical approach has remained essentially intact for nearly four hundred years, but systems thinking has already gone through three distinct generations of change. The first generation of systems thinking (operations research) dealt with the challenge of interdependency in the context of mechanical (deterministic) systems. The second generation of systems thinking (cybernetics and open systems) dealt with the dual challenges of interdependency and self-organization (neg-entropy)4 in the context of living systems. The third generation of systems thinking (design) responds to the triple challenge of interdependency, self-organization, and choice in the context of sociocultural systems.

=== Business architecture ===
In the 1990s the Information Age was unfolding changing the global market economy. With the businesses adapting, the new concept of business architecture was presented as promising alternative. Gharajedaghi (1999) explained the context:

In a global market economy with ever-increasing levels of disturbance, a viable business can no longer be locked into a single form or function. Success comes from a self-renewing capability to spontaneously create structures and functions that fit the moment. In this context, proper functioning of self-reference would certainly prevent the vacillations and the random search for new products/markets that have, over the past years, destroyed so many businesses.
In fact, the ability to continuously match the portfolio of internal competencies with the portfolio of emerging market opportunities is the foundation of the emerging concept of new business architecture ...

According to Bodine and Hilty (2009) "important advances in this area borrowed from the operations discipline came in 1993 in the form of Michael Hammer and James Champy's book Reengineering the Corporation, which introduced tools for mapping and optimizing business activities using process modeling. The Balanced Scorecard developed by Robert Kaplan and David Norton at about the same time enabled the business to measure overall corporate success against goals on qualitative as well as quantitative dimensions."

== Selected publications ==
- Ackoff, Russell L., Elsa Vergara Finnel, and Jamshid Gharajedaghi. A guide to controlling your corporation's future. Wiley, 1984.
- Gharajedaghi, Jamshid. Toward a systems theory of organization. Intersystems Publications, 1985.
- Gharajedaghi, Jamshid. Systems thinking: Managing chaos and complexity: A platform for designing business architecture. Elsevier, 1999; 2005; 2011.

Articles, a selection:

- Gharajedaghi, Jamshid, and Russell L. Ackoff. "Mechanisms, organisms and social systems." Strategic Management Journal 5.3 (1984): 289–300.
- Ackoff, Russell L., and Jamshid Gharajedaghi. "Reflections on systems and their models." Systems Research 13.1 (1996): 13–23.
