= James Grier Miller =

American biologist

James Grier Miller (1916 – 7 November 2002, in California) was an American biologist, a pioneer of systems science and academic administrator, who originated the modern use of the term "behavioral science", founded and directed the multi-disciplinary Mental Health Research Institute at the University of Michigan, and originated the living systems theory.

== Biography ==
Miller received his A.B. summa cum laude in 1937, an A.M. in psychology in 1938, an M.D. cum laude in 1942, and a Ph.D. in psychology in 1943, all from Harvard University where he was also a junior fellow of the Society of Fellows. Following military service in World War II, he served as Chief of the newly formed Clinical Psychology section of the Veteran's Administration central office in Washington.

Having served on the faculty at Harvard, in 1948 he accepted the position of Chairman of the Department of Psychology at the University of Chicago, which he held until 1955. From 1955 to 1967 he directed the multi-disciplinary Mental Health Research Institute at the University of Michigan, leaving in 1967 to pursue an administrative career, first as provost of the newly founded Cleveland State University, and then in 1973 as president of the University of Louisville, from which position he retired in 1980.

He was a fellow or member of numerous scientific and professional societies. He served as president of the Society for General Systems Research (SGSR) succeeding Margaret Mead in 1973. He was a founder and the first head of EDUCOM (the Interuniversity Communications Council). He also had been a fellow of the International Institute for Applied Systems Analysis (IIASA) in Vienna. Miller founded and was editor of the Journal Behavioral Science for more than 30 years.

== See also ==
- Living systems theory
- Systems theory
- Wikiversity

== Publications ==
Miller has written or co-authored nine books and published more than 100 scientific and scholarly articles.

- 1942. Unconsciousness. New York: John Wiley & Sons.
- 1948. OSS Assessment Staff. Assessment of men. New York: Rinehart & Company.
- 1950. Experiments in social process. (Ed.) New York: Mc Graw-Hill.
- 1959. The pharmacology and clinical usefulness of carisoprodol. (Ed.) Detroit: Wayne State University Press.
- 1960. Drugs and behavior. (Ed.) with L. Uhr. New York: John Wiley & Sons.
- 1978. Living systems. New York: Mc Graw-Hill.
- 1978. Living Systems. The Basic Concepts
- 1989. Measurement and interpretations in accounting: a living systems theory approach. With G.A. Swanson, New York: Quorum Books.
