= Gerhard Chroust =

Austrian systems scientist

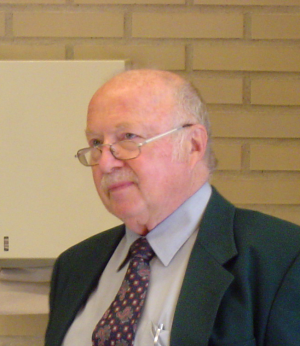
Gerhard Chroust in 2007 at the JKU Linz

Gerhard Chroust (born 23 April 1941) is an Austrian systems scientist, and Professor Emeritus for Systems Engineering and Automation at the Institute of System Sciences at the Johannes Kepler University Linz, Austria. Chroust is an authority in the fields of formal programming languages and interdisciplinary information management.

== Biography ==
Gerhard Chroust was born in 1941 in Vienna, Austria. He began studying Communications-electronics in 1959 and received a M.A. from TU Wien in 1964, a M.A. from the University of Pennsylvania in 1965, and a PhD from TU Wien in 1974.

From 1966 to 1991 Chroust worked at the IBM Laboratory Vienna. He started working at the Johannes Kepler University Linz and TU Wien in 1975 as lecturer for Microprogramming. In 1980 he became Assistant Professor in Computer Science, and lectured "Dataflow Mechanisms", "Dataflow Mechanisms" and later "Software Development Process" at the Johannes Kepler University Linz, at the University of Klagenfurt and at TU Wien. From 1992 until 2007 he was Professor for 'Systems Engineering and Automation' at the Johannes Kepler University Linz and Head of the Department (in 2004 transferred into an Institute) of Systems Engineering and Automation from 1992 until 2007.

Chroust is Editor-in-Chief of the IFSR Newsletter a.o. Furthermore, he is Chairperson of the Editorial Board of the Book Series of the Austrian Computer Society (OCG), Editorial Board Member of several journals: The Journal of Microprocessors and Microsystems from 1976 until 1985, the IBM Programming Series from 1978 until 1990, the Computer Standards and Interfaces from 1992 until 2005, and Systems Research and Behavioral Science since 1994. In 1997 he was also on the Academic board of the International Encyclopedia of Systems and Cybernetics, edited by Charles François.

Further Chroust is organizationally active is as Secretary/Treasurer at the International Federation for Systems Research, Vice-President of the Austrian Society of Cybernetic Studies and Advisor to Austrian Standards Committee.

=== Family ===
Gerhard Chroust has been married to Janie Chroust, née Weps, since 1968. They have two sons Martin (* 1971) and Stefan (* 1974), and five grandchildren Adrian (* 2001), Niklas (* 2004), Viktoria (* 2005), Rebecca (* 2007) and Ella (* 2008).

== Work ==
The research interests of Gerhard Chroust are in the fields of Software Engineering (Representation and Enactment of Software Process Models, Quality and Improvement of Development Processes), Systems Science and Systemic Aspects of Engineering, Emergence, History of Computers and Information Technology, and Human Aspects of Software Development.

=== Cybernetics and Programming Languages ===
In 1964 Chroust wrote his Masters Thesis "Kybernetisches Modell: Muehlespiel Masters" about cybernetics and continued to investigate cybernetic machines for another four years.

From the study of Theorem Proving 1965-66 Chroust continued to study formal definition of Programming Languages, whereby he developed the "Vienna Definition Language". He started studying compiler theory and the evaluation of arithmetic expressions from 1967 until 1975.

In the 1970s Chroust continued to study parallelism and simulation from 1969 until 1972, microprogramming from 1975 until 1990 and compiler building from 1976 until 1982.

=== Software engineering and information technology engineering ===
In the 1980s the scope of Chroust's research turned towards software engineering and its environment, and towards information technology engineering in the 1990s. He had a special interest in software inspections and Workflow management.

== Publications ==
Chroust has written, co-authored and edited a dozen books and over 400 articles, papers and other publications. A selection:

- 1980. Firmware, microprogramming, and restructurable hardware : proceedings of the IFIP Working Conference on Firmware, Microprogramming, and Restructurable Hardware, Linz, Austria, April 28-May 1, 1980. Edited with Jörg R. Mühlbacher.
- 1985. Formal models in programming : proceedings of the IFIP TC2 Working Conference on the Role of Abstract Models in Information Processing, Vienna, Austria, 30 January - 1 February 1985. Edited with E.J. Neuhold.
- 1989. Mikroprogrammierung und Rechnerentwurf. Oldenbourg Verlag.
- 1992. Modelle der Software-Entwicklung - Aufbau und Interpretation von Vorgehensmodellen. Oldenbourg Verlag Wien-München.
- 1994. Workflow management : challenges, paradigms, and products : CON '94. Edited with A. Benczúr.
- 1994. Interdisciplinary Information Management Talks 94. Edited with P. Doucek.
- 1995. Umfrage Workflow - Eine Momentaufnahme über die Verbreitung, Einsatz und Meinungen über Workflow in den deutschsprachigen Ländern. With J. Bergsmann. Oldenbourg Wien-München.
- 1995. Die Geschichte der Datenverarbeitung - Bibliographie zur Geschichtswand. With H. Zemanek. Oldenbourg Wien/München
- 1998. Adolf Adam - 80 Jahre, eine Anekdotensammlung, ÖSGK, Reports of the Austrian Society for Cybernetic Studies, Vienna.
- 2005. IFSR 2005 - The New Roles of Systems Sciences for a Knowledge-based Society, Kobe 2005. Edited with Jifa Gu. Jaist Press, Komatsu, Japan.
