= Kenneth D. Bailey (sociologist) =

American sociologist

- Born: 1943 (age 82–83)
- Education: University of Texas at Austin
- Scientific career
- Fields: sociology, systems theory
- Workplaces: University of California, Los Angeles

Kenneth D. Bailey (1943 - October 29 2009) was an American sociologist, systems scientist and professor of sociology at the University of California, Los Angeles.

== Biography ==
Bailey studied at the University of Texas at Austin. He got there a B.S. in mathematics in 1963, a M.A. in sociology in 1966 and a Ph.D. in sociology in 1968. The last four years he got an N.D.E.A. Fellowships. Summer 1967 he participated in a workshop in mathematical sociology at the Johns Hopkins University.

Since 1968 he worked at the University of California, Los Angeles, at the department of sociology as assistant professor. From 1971 to 1974 he worked there as director of a population research program, a survey research center at the university. From 1974 to 1989 he was associate professor and since then professor.

In between he was a scholar and visiting associate professor at the department of sociology at the Tulane University from 1981 to 1983. Since 1984 he is also a senior research fellow at the International Systems Science institute in La Jolla.

Bailey is a member of the American Sociological Association, the International Society for the Systems Sciences, where he was president in 2003, and the International Sociological Association and the Society for the Study of Social Problems.

Bailey participated in scientific reviews as American Sociological Review from 1974 to 1976, Systems Practice from 1987 to 1989, Behavioral Science from 1993 to 1997 and Systems Research and Behavioral Science since 1997. He also refereed in some dozen other magazines and books.

== Work ==
Bailey's research interests have been in the fields of research methods, systems theory and environmental demography and ecology.

=== Sociology and new systems theory ===
In his 1994 work Sociology and new systems theory. Toward a theoretical synthesis, Bailey questioned if in those days social systems theory really existed, and if science could speak of a new social systems theory. In Bailey's opinion the works in this fields in those days did not bears much resemblance to the original action theory of Talcott Parsons since the 1950s.

=== Social entropy theory ===
One of the main focuses of Bailey was the development a macro-sociological systems theory, which he named social entropy theory. In this the concept of social entropy stood for a "measure of the natural decay of the structure or of the disappearance of distinctions within a social system."

== See also ==
- Living systems theory
- Sociology
- Taxonomy

== Publications ==
Bailey wrote several books, articles and papers. A selection:

- 1978. Methods of Social Research. New York: Free Press, 1978
- 1985. Systems Inquiring: Applications. With Bela H. Banathy et al. (ed.), Volume II of the Proceedings of the Society for General Systems Research International Conference. Seaside, CA: Intersystems Publications.
- 1990. Social Entropy Theory. Albany, New York: State University of New York (SUNY) Press.
- 1994. Sociology and the new systems theory: Toward a theoretical synthesis. Albany, NY: SUNY Press.
- 1994. Typologies and Taxonomies: An Introduction to Classification Techniques. Thousand Oaks, California: Sage Publications, 1994.
- 1997. Systems Thinking, Globalization of Knowledge, and Communitarian Ethics. Edited with Yong Pil Rhee. Proceedings of the International Society for the Systems Sciences International Conference. Seoul, Korea, 1997

Articles — a selection

- 1998. "Structure, Structuration, and Autopoiesis: The Emerging. Significance of Recursive Theory." In: Current Perspectives in Social Theory 18 (1998), pp. 131–154
- 2001. "Systems Theory". In: Jonathan Turner (ed.), Handbook of Sociological Theory'.
- 2006. "Living systems theory and social entropy theory". In: Systems Research and Behavioral Science, 23, 291–300.
