= Russell L. Ackoff =

American organizational theorist, consultant and management scientist (1919-2009)

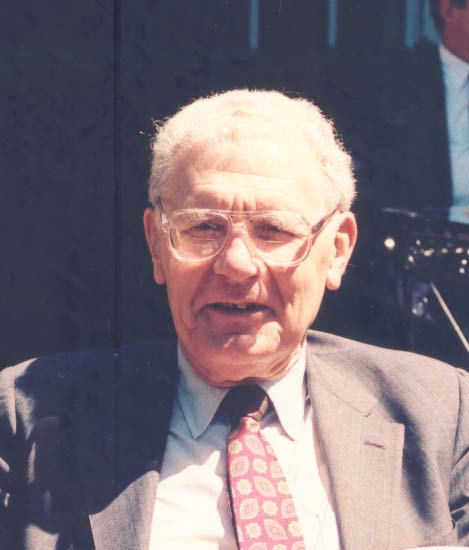
- Russell Ackoff at Washington University in St. Louis, May 1993
- Born: Russell Lincoln Ackoff; February 12, 1919; Philadelphia, Pennsylvania, U.S.
- Died: October 29, 2009 (aged 90); Paoli, Pennsylvania, U.S.
- Education: University of Pennsylvania (BA, 1941); University of Pennsylvania (PhD, 1947)
- Known for: Organizational theory, general systems theory, operations research
- Scientific career
- Fields: Systems sciences Management science
- Workplaces: Wharton School of the University of Pennsylvania
- Doctoral advisor: C. West Churchman
- Other academic advisors: Edgar A. Singer, Jr.
- Doctoral students: Peter C. Fishburn, William Richard King, Francisco Sagasti

Russell Lincoln Ackoff (February 12, 1919 – October 29, 2009) was an American organizational theorist, consultant, and Anheuser-Busch Professor Emeritus of Management Science at the Wharton School, University of Pennsylvania. Ackoff was a pioneer in the field of operations research, systems thinking and management science.

== Biography ==
Russell L. Ackoff was born on February 12, 1919, in Philadelphia to Jack and Fannie (Weitz) Ackoff. He received his bachelor degree in architecture at the University of Pennsylvania in 1941. After graduation, he taught at Penn for one year as an assistant instructor in philosophy. From 1942 to 1946, he served in the U.S. Army in the Philippines. He returned to study at the University of Pennsylvania, where he received his doctorate in philosophy of science in 1947 as C. West Churchman’s first doctoral student. He also received a number of honorary doctorates, from 1967 and onward.

From 1947 to 1951 Ackoff was assistant professor in philosophy and mathematics at the Wayne State University. He was associate professor and professor of operations research at Case Institute of Technology from 1951 to 1964. In 1961 and 1962 he was also visiting professor of operational research at the University of Birmingham. From 1964 to 1986 he was professor of systems sciences and professor of management science at the Wharton School at the University of Pennsylvania.

Nicholson and Myers (1998) report that, in the 1970s and 1980s, the Social Systems Sciences Program at the Wharton School was "noted for combining theory and practice, escaping disciplinary bounds, and driving students toward independent thought and action. The learning environment was fostered by distinguished standing and visiting faculty such as Eric Trist, C. West Churchman, Hasan Ozbekhan, Thomas A. Cowan, and Fred Emery".

Beginning in 1979, Ackoff worked together with John Pourdehnad as consultants in a broad range of industries including aerospace, chemicals, computer equipment, data services and software, electronics, energy, food and beverages, healthcare, hospitality, industrial equipment, automotive, insurance, metals, mining, pharmaceuticals, telecommunications, utilities, and transportation.

From 1986 to 2009, Ackoff was professor emeritus of the Wharton School, and chairman of Interact, the Institute for Interactive Management. From 1989 to 1995 he was visiting professor of marketing at Washington University in St. Louis.

Ackoff was president of Operations Research Society of America (ORSA) from 1956 to 1957, and he was president of the International Society for the Systems Sciences (ISSS) in 1987.

In 1965 Ackoff was elected as a Fellow of the American Statistical Association. He was elected to the 2002 class of Fellows of the Institute for Operations Research and the Management Sciences. He was awarded an honorary Doctor of Science at the University of Lancaster, UK in 1967. He got a Silver Medal from the Operational Research Society in 1971. Other honors came from the Washington University in St. Louis in 1993, the University of New Haven in 1997, the Pontificia Universidad Catolica Del Peru, Lima in 1999 and the University of Lincolnshire & Humberside, UK in 1999. That year from the UK Systems Society he got an Award for outstanding achievement in Systems Thinking and Practice.

Ackoff married Alexandra Makar on July 17, 1949. The couple had three children: Alan W., Karen B., and Karla S. After his wife's death, Ackoff married Helen Wald on December 20, 1987.

Between 2003 and 2007, Ackoff delivered an annual series of public lectures, both half-day and full-day, for which the Ackoff family has granted permission for public viewing at this link.

Russell L. Ackoff died unexpectedly Thursday, October 29, 2009, after complications of hip replacement surgery.

== Work ==
Throughout the years Ackoff's work in research, consulting and education has involved more than 250 corporations and 50 governmental agencies in the U.S. and abroad.

=== Operations research ===
Russell Ackoff started his career in operations research at the end of the 1940s. His 1957 book Introduction to Operations Research, co-authored with C. West Churchman and Leonard Arnoff, was one of the first publications that helped define the field. The influence of this work, according to Kirby and Rosenhead (2005), "on the early development of the discipline in the USA and in Britain in the 1950s and 1960s is hard to over-estimate".

In the 1970s Ackoff became one of the most important critics of the so-called "technique-dominated Operations Research", and started proposing more participative approaches. His critiques, according to Kirby and Rosenhead (2005), "had little resonance within the USA, but were picked up both in Britain, where they helped to stimulate the growth of Problem Structuring Methods, and in the systems community world-wide", such as soft systems methodology from Peter Checkland.

=== Purposeful systems ===
In 1972 Ackoff wrote a book with Frederick Edmund Emery about purposeful systems, which focused on the question how systems thinking relates to human behaviour. "Individual systems are purposive", they said, "knowledge and understanding of their aims can only be gained by taking into account the mechanisms of social, cultural, and psychological systems".

Any human-created systems can be characterized as "purposeful system" when its "members are also purposeful individuals who intentionally and collectively formulate objectives and are parts of larger purposeful systems". Other characteristics are:

- "A purposeful system or individual is ideal-seeking if... it chooses another objective that more closely approximates its ideal".
- "An ideal-seeking system or individual is necessarily one that is purposeful, but not all purposeful entities seek ideals", and
- "The capability of seeking ideals may well be a characteristic that distinguishes man from anything he can make, including computers".

According to Kirby and Rosenhead (2005), "the fact that these systems were experiencing profound change could be attributed to the end of the "Machine Age" and the onset of the "Systems Age". The Machine Age, bequeathed by the Industrial Revolution, was underpinned by two concepts – reductionism (everything can in the end be decomposed into indivisible parts) and mechanism (cause-effect relationships)". Hereby "all phenomena were believed to be explained by using only one ultimately simple relationship, cause-effect", which in the Systems Age are replaced by expansionism and teleology with producer-product replacing cause-effect. "Expansionism is a doctrine maintaining that all objects and events, and all experiences of them, are parts of larger wholes." According to Ackoff, "the beginning of the end of the Machine Age and the beginning of the Systems Age could be dated to the 1940s, a decade when philosophers, mathematicians, and biologists, building on developments in the interwar period, defined a new intellectual framework".

=== f-Laws ===
In 2006, Ackoff worked with Herbert J. Addison and Sally Bibb. They developed the term f-Law to describe a series of over 100 distilled observations of bad leadership and the misplaced wisdom that often surrounds management in organizations. A collection of subversive epigrams published in two volumes by Triarchy Press, these f-Laws expose the common flaws in both the practice of leadership and in the established beliefs that surround it. According to Ackoff "f-Laws are truths about organizations that we might wish to deny or ignore – simple and more reliable guides to managers' everyday behavior than the complex truths proposed by scientists, economists, sociologists, politicians and philosophers".

=== White House Communications Agency ===
In collaboration with Dr. J. Gerald Suarez, Ackoff's ideas were introduced and implemented at the White House Communications Agency and The White House Military Office during the Clinton and Bush administrations, a historic effort to bring the White House into the age of systems thinking.

=== Relationship to Peter Drucker ===
Russell Ackoff was friends with Peter Drucker from the earliest days of their careers. Mr. Drucker acknowledged the early, critical contribution Ackoff made to his work – and the world of management in general – in the following letter, which was delivered to Ackoff by former General Motors V.P. Vince Barabba on the occasion of the 3rd International Conference on Systems Thinking in Management (ICSTM) held at the University of Pennsylvania, May 19–24, 2004:

I was then, as you may recall, one of the early ones who applied Operations Research and the new methods of Quantitative Analysis to specific BUSINESS PROBLEMS—rather than, as they had been originally developed for, to military or scientific problems. I had led teams applying the new methodology in two of the world’s largest companies—GE and AT&T. We had successfully solved several major production and technical problems for these companies—and my clients were highly satisfied. But I was not—we had solved TECHNICAL problems but our work had no impact on the organizations and on their mindsets. On the contrary: we had all but convinced the managements of these two big companies that QUANTITATIVE MANIPULATION was a substitute for THINKING. And then your work and your example showed us—or at least, it showed me—that the QUANTITATIVE ANALYSIS comes AFTER the THINKING—it validates the thinking; it shows up intellectual sloppiness and uncritical reliance on precedent, on untested assumptions and on the seemingly “obvious.” But it does not substitute for hard, rigorous, intellectually challenging THINKING. It demands it, though—but does not replace it. This is, of course, what YOU mean BY system. And your work in those far-away days thus saved me—as it saved countless others—from either descending into mindless “model building” – the disease that all but destroyed so many of the Business Schools in the last decades—or from sloppiness parading as ‘insight.’

== Publications ==
Ackoff authored or co-authored 35 books and published over 150 articles in a variety of journals. Books:

- 1946, Psychologistics, with C. West Churchman.
- 1947, Measurement of Consumer Interest, with C. W. Churchman and M. Wax (ed.).
- 1950, Methods of Inquiry: an introduction to philosophy and scientific method, with C. W. Churchman. Educational Publishers: St. Louis.
- 1953, The Design of Social Research.
- 1957, Introduction to Operations Research, with C. W. Churchman and E. L. Arnoff. John Wiley & Sons: New York.
- 1961, Progress in Operations Research, I. Wiley: New York.
- 1962, Scientific Method: optimizing applied research decisions, Wiley: New York.
- 1963, A Manager's Guide to Operations Research, with P. Rivett. Wiley: New York.
- 1968, Fundamentals of Operations Research, with M. Sasieni. John Wiley & Sons: New York.
- 1970, A Concept of Corporate Planning. Wiley-Interscience: New York.
- 1972, On Purposeful Systems: An Interdisciplinary Analysis of Individual and Social Behavior as a System of Purposeful Events, with Frederick Edmund Emery, Aldine-Atherton: Chicago.
- 1974, Redesigning the Future: A Systems Approach to Societal Problems. John Wiley & Sons: New York.
- 1974, Systems and Management Annual, (ed.).
- 1976, The SCATT Report, with T. A. Cowan, Peter Davis (ed.).
- 1976, Some Observations and Reflections on Mexican Development.
- 1978, The Art of Problem Solving: accompanied by Ackoff's Fables. John Wiley & Sons: New York. Illustrations by Karen B. Ackoff.
- 1981, Creating the Corporate Future: plan or be planned for. John Wiley & Sons: New York.
- 1984, A Guide to Controlling Your Corporation's Future, with E.V. Finnel and Jamshid Gharajedaghi.
- 1984, Revitalizing Western Economies, with P. Broholm and R. Snow.
- 1986, Management in Small Doses. John Wiley & Sons: New York.
- 1991, Ackoff's Fables: Irreverent Reflections on Business and Bureaucracy. John Wiley & Sons: New York.
- 1994, The Democratic Corporation: a radical prescription for recreating corporate America and rediscovering success. Oxford Univ. Press: New York.
- 1998, Exploring Personality: an intellectual odyssey. CQM: Cambridge, MA.
- 1999, Ackoff's Best: his classic writings on management. John Wiley & Sons: New York.
- 1999, Re-Creating the Corporation: a design of organizations for the 21st century. Oxford Univ. Press: New York.
- 2000, "A Theory of a System for Educators and Managers", with W. Edwards Deming
- 2003, Redesigning Society, with Sheldon Rovin. Stanford Univ. Press: Stanford, Calif.
- 2005, Beating the System, with Sheldon Rovin. Triarchy Press, Devon, UK
- 2006, Idealized Design: How to Dissolve Tomorrow's Crisis Today, with Jason Magidson and Herbert J. Addison. Wharton School Publishing. Upper Saddle River, NJ.
- 2006, A Little Book of f-Laws, with Herbert J. Addison and Sally Bibb. Triarchy Press, Devon, UK
- 2007, Management f-Laws, with Herbert J. Addison and Sally Bibb. Triarchy Press, Devon, UK
- 2008, Turning Learning Right Side Up: Putting Education Back on Track (pdf) with Daniel Greenberg.
- 2010, Memories. Triarchy Press, Devon, UK
- 2010, Differences that Make a Difference. Triarchy Press, Devon, UK
- 2012, Ackoff's F/Laws: The Cake. Triarchy Press, Devon, UK

=== Articles, a selection ===
- Ackoff, R. (1967). "Management Misinformation Systems" (PDF). Management Science. 14 (4): 147–156. Archived from the original (PDF) on January 13, 2004.
- 1968, "General Systems Theory and Systems Research Contrasting Conceptions of Systems Science." in: Views on a General Systems Theory: Proceedings from the Second System Symposium, Mihajlo D. Mesarovic (Ed.).
- 1971, Towards A System of Systems Concepts.
- 1973, "Science in the Systems Age: Beyond IE, OR, and MS", Operations Research 21(3), pp. 661–671. Reprinted as "Science in the Systems Age" in Wharton Quarterly 1973. 7 (2); pp. 8–13.
- 1974, "The Social Responsibility of Operational Research" Operational Research Quarterly 25 (3), pp. 361–371.
- 1975, "Advertising Research at Anheuser-Busch, Inc. (1963-68)", with James R. Emshoff, Sloan Management Review, 16 (2), pp. 1–15.
- 1975, "A Reply to the Comments of Yvan Allaire", with James R. Emshoff, Sloan Management Review, 16 (3), pp. 95–98.
- 1977, "The Corporate Rain Dance", The Wharton Magazine, Winter, pp. 36–41.
- 1996, On Learning and Systems That Facilitate it, in: Center for Quality of Management Journal Vol. 5, No.2.
- "A Systemic View of Transformational Leadership" (PDF). 1998. Archived from the original (PDF) on May 12, 2005.
- 2003, Terrorism: A Systemic View, with Johan P. Strumpfer, in: Systems Research and Behavioral Science 20, pp. 287–294.
- 2004, Transforming The Systems Movement
- "A major mistake that managers make" (PDF). acasa.upenn.edu. 2006. Archived from the original (PDF) on June 19, 2006.

Some Ackoff center blogs:

- 2006, Thinking about the future
- 2006, Why few organizations adopt systems thinking in: Systems Research and Behavioral Science. 23, pp. 705–708.

Podcast:

- 2005, Doing the Wrong Thing Right by Russell Ackoff, October 2005.
