= Markus Schwaninger =

Austrian economist

Markus Schwaninger (born 26 December 1947) is an Austrian economist and Professor of Management at the University of St. Gallen, Switzerland, and Director of the International World Organization of Systems and Cybernetics. He is known for his co-authorship of the St. Galler Management-Model.

== Life and work ==
Schwaninger was born in Salzburg, Austria. After several years of practical experience in private and public organizations, he studied economics at the University of St. Gallen. In 1980 he obtained his doctorate at the University of Innsbruck, Austria, and in 1987 obtained his Habilitation at the University of St. Gallen with a postdoctoral thesis ("Habilitationsschrift") on integral planning.

In 1990 Schwaninger was called to the Institute of Management at the University of St. Gallen, where he is appointed Professor of Management. He also directs the International World Organization of Systems and Cybernetics.

Schwaningers research and teaching are focused on the management of complex dynamic systems, with a methodological emphasis on Organizational Cybernetics and System Dynamics. His research projects to date have been related to organizational intelligence, model-based management, the design, transformation and learning of organizations, and systemic issues of sustainability.

== Selected publications ==
Schwaninger is author of more than 200 publications in six languages, and editor of the works of Hans Ulrich and Aloys Gälweiler. Books, a selection:

- 1979. Organisatorische Gestaltung in der Hotellerie. Doctoral thesis University of Innsbruck
- 1989. Integrale Unternehmensplanung. Campus, Frankfurt/New York 1989. ISBN 3-593-33973-0.
- 1993. Organisational Fitness - Corporate Effectiveness through Management Cybernetics. Eds. Espejo R. & Schwaninger, M. (with contributions by Stafford Beer, etc.). Campus Frankfurt/New York.
- 1994. Managementsysteme. Frankfurt/Main: Campus Verl, 1994.
- 1996. Organizational Transformation and Learning. Wiley, Chichester, 1996. (Co-authors: Espejo, R.; Schuhmann, W.; Schwaninger, M.; Bilello, U.).
- 2008. Intelligent organizations [electronic resource]: powerful models for systemic management. Springer, 2008.
- 2009. Intelligent Organizations. Powerful Models for Systemic Management (Second Edition). Springer, Berlin. ISBN 978-3-540-85161-5.
- 2022. Wege aus der COVID-19-Krise. Anamnese, Diagnose und Design. Eds. Tuckermann, H. & Schwaninger, M. Haupt. Berne. ISBN 978-3-258-08271-4

Articles, a selection:

- Schwaninger, Markus. "Intelligent organizations: an integrative framework." Systems Research and Behavioral Science 18.2 (2001): 137-158.
- Sinha-Khetriwal, Deepali, Philipp Kraeuchi, and Markus Schwaninger. "A comparison of electronic waste recycling in Switzerland and in India." Environmental Impact Assessment Review 25.5 (2005): 492-504.
- Markus Schwaninger, "Obituary Anatol Rapoport (May 22, 1911 - January 20, 2007): Pioneer of Systems Theory and Peace Research, Mathematician, Philosopher and Pianist." Systems Research and Behavioral Science, Vol. 24, 2007, pp. 655–658.
- Schwaninger, Markus; Groesser, Stefan (2008) "System Dynamics as Model-Based Theory Building." Systems Research and Behavioral Science, 25 (4) 2008, 447-465
- Schwaninger, Markus. "Model-based management (MBM): a vital prerequisite for organizational viability." Kybernetes 39.9/10 (2010): 1419-1428.
- Schwaninger, Markus; Pérez Ríos, José. "Models of organizational cybernetics for diagnosis and design." Kybernetes 39.9/10 (2010): 1529-1550.
- Grösser, Stefan N., and Markus Schwaninger. "Contributions to model validation: hierarchy, process, and cessation." System Dynamics Review 28.2 (2012): 157-181.
- Schwaninger, Markus (2013). “An Integrative Systems Methodology for Dealing with Complex Issues.” In J. Zelger, J. Müller & S. Plangger (Eds.), GABEK VI - Sozial verantwortliche Entscheidungsprozesse = Socially responsible decision making processes, pp. 177–196. Innsbruck: StudienVerlag.
- Schwaninger, M. (2014). „Klassiker der Organisationsforschung (13) - Hans Ulrich.“ Organisationsentwicklung, 2014(3), 86-90.
- Schwaninger, Markus (2015). “Organizing for Sustainability: a Cybernetic Concept for Sustainable Renewal.” Kybernetes, Vol. 44 Issue 6/7, pp. 935 – 954.
- Schwaninger, Markus; Scheef, Christine (2016) “A Test of the Viable System Model: Theoretical Claim vs. Empirical Evidence.” Cybernetics and Systems: An International Journal 47(7): 544-569. DOI: 10.1080/01969722.2016.1209375.
- Vithessonthi, Chaiporn; Schwaninger, Markus; Müller, Matthias O. (2017) “Monetary Policy, Bank Lending and Corporate Investment.” International Review of Financial Analysis 50:129-142.
