= Fred Emery =

Fred Emery may refer to:

- Fred Emery (psychologist) (1925–1997), Australian psychologist and social scientist
- Fred Emery (journalist) (1933–2025), British television presenter and investigative journalist
- Fred Emery (footballer) (1900–1959), English footballer
