= Yearbook of International Organizations =

Reference work on non-profit international organizations

The Yearbook of International Organizations is a reference work on non-profit international organizations, published by the Union of International Associations. It was first published in 1908 under the title Annuaire de la vie internationale, and has been known under its current title since 1950. It is seen as a quasi-official source associated with the United Nations.

The Yearbook contains profiles of over 67,000 organizations active in about 300 countries and territories in every field of human endeavor. It profiles both international intergovernmental organizations and non-governmental organizations, from formal structures to informal networks, from professional bodies to recreational clubs. The Yearbook does not, however, include for-profit enterprises. Profiles include names and addresses, historical and structural information, aims, links with other organizations, as well as specifics on activities, events, publications and membership. In addition to organization profiles, the Yearbook also provides biographies of important members, a bibliography of the important publications of international organizations, and statistics.

The Yearbook is published in six book volumes and online.

== See also ==
- Encyclopedia of World Problems and Human Potential
- International Congress Calendar
