= Institute of Cultural Affairs International =

International non-governmental organization

The Institute of Cultural Affairs International (known as ICA International or ICAI) is an international non-governmental organization (INGO) based in Toronto, Canada. Its primary objective is to impact global human development by facilitating authentic and sustainable transformations in individuals, communities, and organizations.

== Objectives ==
The strategic objectives of ICA International are:

- To facilitate the sharing of experiences, values, and lessons at a global level in order to influence international development policy.
- To develop and facilitate global partnerships.
- To address human development challenges.
- To coordinate programs and initiatives involving multiple member ICA organizations for global impact.
- To support member ICAs through training and capacity building initiatives and facilitate regular networking and interchange among member ICAs.

== History ==
In the 1970s and 1980s, the ICA established several thousand model villages around the world to demonstrate what is possible when people work together.

ICA Nepal hosted the 8th global conference on human development in Kahtmnandu, Nepal in late 2012. In this occasion a book entitled 'Changing lives changing society' was released.

== Global network ==
ICAI is a network of national member organizations located worldwide.

=== Africa ===
- Benin
- Ivory Coast
- Cameroon
- Egypt
- Ghana
- Kenya
- Nigeria
- South Africa
- Tanzania
- Togo
- Uganda
- Zambia
- Zimbabwe

=== Asia ===
- Bangladesh
- India
- Japan
- Malaysia
- Nepal
- Taiwan
- Tajikistan

=== Europe ===
- Belgium
- Bosnia and Herzegovina
- Netherlands

=== North America ===
- Canada
- Guatemala
- United States

=== Oceania ===
- Australia

=== South America ===
- Chile
- Peru

== Relationships ==
ICAI maintains relationships with key international bodies and other international organizations, including:

- Special consultative status with the United Nations Economic and Social Council (ECOSOC)
- Liaison status with the Food and Agriculture Organization of the United Nations (FAO)
- Working relation status with the World Health Organization (WHO)
- Consultative status with the United Nations Children’s Fund (UNICEF)
- Service on the non-governmental organization (NGO) consultative group for the International Fund for Agriculture Development (IFAD)
- Membership in CIVICUS, the world alliance for citizen participation.
