= Living systems =

Multiple interactions and regulation of life forms with their environment

A presentation on information flow in living systems

Living systems are life forms (or, more colloquially known as living things) treated as a system. They are said to be open self-organizing and said to interact with their environment. These systems are maintained by flows of information, energy and matter. Multiple theories of living systems have been proposed. Such theories attempt to map general principles for how all living systems work.

== Context ==
Some scientists have proposed in the last few decades that a general theory of living systems is required to explain the nature of life. Such a general theory would arise out of the ecological and biological sciences and attempt to map general principles for how all living systems work. Instead of examining phenomena by attempting to break things down into components, a general living systems theory explores phenomena in terms of dynamic patterns of the relationships of organisms with their environment.

== Theories ==
=== Miller's open systems ===
James Grier Miller's living systems theory is a general theory about the existence of all living systems, their structure, interaction, behavior and development, intended to formalize the concept of life. According to Miller's 1978 book Living Systems, such a system must contain each of twenty "critical subsystems" defined by their functions. Miller considers living systems as a type of system. Below the level of living systems, he defines space and time, matter and energy, information and entropy, levels of organization, and physical and conceptual factors, and above living systems ecological, planetary and solar systems, galaxies, etc. Miller's central thesis is that the multiple levels of living systems (cells, organs, organisms, groups, organizations, societies, supranational systems) are open systems composed of critical and mutually-dependent subsystems that process inputs, throughputs, and outputs of energy and information. Seppänen (1998) says that Miller applied general systems theory on a broad scale to describe all aspects of living systems. Bailey states that Miller's theory is perhaps the "most integrative" social systems theory, clearly distinguishing between matter–energy-processing and information-processing, showing how social systems are linked to biological systems. LST analyzes the irregularities or "organizational pathologies" of systems functioning (e.g., system stress and strain, feedback irregularities, information–input overload). It explicates the role of entropy in social research while it equates negentropy with information and order. It emphasizes both structure and process, as well as their interrelations.

=== Lovelock's Gaia hypothesis ===
The idea that Earth is alive is found in philosophy and religion, but the first scientific discussion of it was by the Scottish geologist James Hutton. In 1785, he stated that Earth was a superorganism and that its proper study should be physiology. The Gaia hypothesis, proposed in the 1960s by James Lovelock, suggests that life on Earth functions as a single organism that defines and maintains environmental conditions necessary for its survival.

=== Morowitz's property of ecosystems ===
A systems view of life treats environmental fluxes and biological fluxes together as a "reciprocity of influence," and a reciprocal relation with environment is arguably as important for understanding life as it is for understanding ecosystems. As Harold J. Morowitz (1992) explains it, life is a property of an ecological system rather than a single organism or species. He argues that an ecosystemic definition of life is preferable to a strictly biochemical or physical one. Robert Ulanowicz (2009) highlights mutualism as the key to understand the systemic, order-generating behaviour of life and ecosystems.

=== Rosen's complex systems biology ===
Robert Rosen devoted a large part of his career, from 1958 onwards, to developing a comprehensive theory of life as a self-organizing complex system, "closed to efficient causation". He defined a system component as "a unit of organization; a part with a function, i.e., a definite relation between part and whole." He identified the "nonfractionability of components in an organism" as the fundamental difference between living systems and "biological machines." He summarised his views in his book Life Itself.

Complex systems biology is a field of science that studies the emergence of complexity in functional organisms from the viewpoint of dynamic systems theory. The latter is also often called systems biology and aims to understand the most fundamental aspects of life. A closely related approach, relational biology, is concerned mainly with understanding life processes in terms of the most important relations, and categories of such relations among the essential functional components of organisms; for multicellular organisms, this has been defined as "categorical biology", or a model representation of organisms as a category theory of biological relations, as well as an algebraic topology of the functional organisation of living organisms in terms of their dynamic, complex networks of metabolic, genetic, and epigenetic processes and signalling pathways. Related approaches focus on the interdependence of constraints, where constraints can be either molecular, such as enzymes, or macroscopic, such as the geometry of a bone or of the vascular system.

=== Bernstein, Byerly and Hopf's Darwinian dynamic ===
Harris Bernstein and colleagues argued in 1983 that the evolution of order in living systems and certain physical systems obeys a common fundamental principle termed the Darwinian dynamic. This was formulated by first considering how macroscopic order is generated in a simple non-biological system far from thermodynamic equilibrium, and then extending consideration to short, replicating RNA molecules. The underlying order-generating process was concluded to be basically similar for both types of systems.

=== Gerard Jagers' operator theory ===
Gerard Jagers' operator theory proposes that life is a general term for the presence of the typical closures found in organisms; the typical closures are a membrane and an autocatalytic set in the cell and that an organism is any system with an organisation that complies with an operator type that is at least as complex as the cell. Life can be modelled as a network of inferior negative feedbacks of regulatory mechanisms subordinated to a superior positive feedback formed by the potential of expansion and reproduction.

=== Kauffman's multi-agent system ===
Stuart Kauffman defines a living system as an autonomous agent or a multi-agent system capable of reproducing itself or themselves, and of completing at least one thermodynamic work cycle. This definition is extended by the evolution of novel functions over time.

=== Budisa, Kubyshkin and Schmidt's four pillars ===
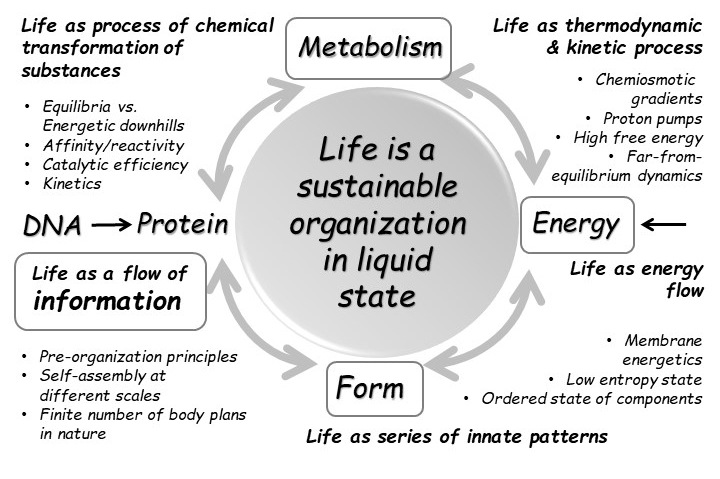
Definition of cellular life according to Budisa, Kubyshkin and Schmidt

Budisa, Kubyshkin and Schmidt defined cellular life as an organizational unit resting on four pillars/cornerstones: (i) energy, (ii) metabolism, (iii) information and (iv) form. This system is able to regulate and control metabolism and energy supply and contains at least one subsystem that functions as an information carrier (genetic information). Cells as self-sustaining units are parts of different populations that are involved in the unidirectional and irreversible open-ended process known as evolution.

=== Constraint-based theory of living systems (C-theory) ===
Constraint-based theory of living systems (C-theory) characterizes living systems in terms of necessary thermodynamic, informational, ecological and architectural constraints that restrict the space of viable living organization. It is scale-bridging rather than scale-free: the same classes of constraints are discussed across levels (molecular → cellular → multicellular → cognitive → ecosystems), without treating any single scale (e.g., metabolism-only or ecosystem-only) as the privileged locus of "life".

A key emphasis is that "logic" (information processing and control) must be physically implemented by "circuitry", which in biology is realized by complex networks (genetic regulation, metabolism, signaling, communication, social organization). These networks are treated as active agents of change in evolution, not merely passive substrates.

The characterizing features of the C-theory are:

- Autonomy via boundaries and energy intermediates: thermodynamic autonomy requires compartmentalization (e.g., membranes) and the storage/use of energy intermediates ("currencies") to decouple internal work from immediate environmental conditions.
- Nonequilibrium maintenance: living systems persist as nonequilibrium steady states sustained by continuous free energy throughput and entropy export.
- Cyclic flux organization: internal metabolic organization is expected to be structured around cyclic transformations/flux cycles.
- Heritable "tape" information: linear heteropolymers with near-equivalent monomer energetics are expected substrates for molecular information and large combinatorial search spaces.
- Constructor logic of self-reproduction: closed compartments equipped with a von Neumann-like replication logic (copying and interpreting descriptions) are posited as requirements for scalable self-reproduction and evolution.
- Architectural trade-offs: sparse, heterogeneous, hierarchical-modular network architectures are argued to be favored by trade-offs between functionality and energetic costs of redundancy, error correction and maintenance; modularity and hierarchy support robustness and "evolvability".
- Critical phenomena in emergence: key steps in the origins and organization of life can be described as bifurcations/phase-transition-like thresholds (e.g., error thresholds, percolation/connectivity thresholds, onset of cycles/autocatalysis, symmetry breaking such as chirality).

==== Role of networks in major evolutionary transitions ====
C-theory highlights that biological networks mediate evolutionary forces and can catalyze the emergence of new organizational levels. Major evolutionary transitions are interpreted as changes in network configurations that enable new dynamical functions, with topology (modularity, hierarchy, sparsity) shaping which innovations are feasible and stable.

==== Multiscale perspective ====
C-theory is compatible with treating living systems as complex adaptive systems and ecological on fast timescales, while describing evolution on slow timescales via effective population-level laws obtained by coarse-graining. In this framing, short-scale dynamics can be nonlinear/feedback-driven and context-dependent, whereas long-scale evolutionary dynamics emerges as a macroscopic replicator–mutator dynamics after integrating out fast fluctuations under thermodynamic and informational constraints.

==== Relationship to other living-systems theories ====
C-theory overlaps with open-systems perspectives (energy/information throughput) but differs by emphasizing quantitative feasibility constraints and trade-offs rather than primarily offering subsystem taxonomies or scale-specific ontologies. It is framed as integrative across thermodynamic, informational/computational, ecological and architectural considerations, with complex networks treated as the required "circuitry" implementing processes as biological "logic" across scales.

== See also ==
- Artificial life – Field of study
- Autonomous Agency Theory
- Autopoiesis – System capable of producing itself
- Biological organization – Hierarchy of complex structures and systems within biological sciences
- Biological systems – Complex network which connects several biologically relevant entities
- Complex systems – System composed of many interacting components
- Earth system science – Scientific study of the Earth's spheres and their natural integrated systems
- Extraterrestrial life – Life that does not originate on Earth
- Information metabolism – Psychological theory of interaction between biological organisms and their environment
- Organism – Individual living life form
- Spome – Hypothetical matter-closed, energy-open life support system
- Systems biology – Computational and mathematical modeling of complex biological systems
- Systems theory – Interdisciplinary study of systems
- Viable System Theory – Approach to systems analyis
