= Union of International Associations =

International organization

- Logo of UIA
- Abbreviation: UIA
- Formation: 1907; 119 years ago
- Type: INGO
- Location: Brussels, Belgium
- Region served: Worldwide
- Official language: English, French
- President: Cyril Ritchie
- Website: uia.org

The Union of International Associations (UIA) is a non-profit non-governmental research institute and documentation center based in Brussels, Belgium, and operating under United Nations mandate. It was founded in 1907 under the name Central Office of International Associations by Henri La Fontaine, the 1913 Nobel Peace Prize laureate, and Paul Otlet, a founding father of what is now called information science.

The UIA is an independent research institute and a repository for current and historical information on the work of global civil society. It serves two main purposes: to document and promote public awareness of the work of international organizations (both INGOs and IGOs), international meetings, and world problems. The UIA also supports and facilitates the work of international associations through training and networking opportunities.

It has consultative status with ECOSOC and UNESCO.

== History ==
The two founders started work setting up the Central Office of International Organisations and then conducting a survey of international organisations with headquarters in Belgium. Then with the help of the sociologist Cyril van Overbergh they extend this research to organisations based elsewhere. After collaborating with Alfred Fried on the production of Annuaire de la Vie Internationale they produced their own edition without him.

== Top meeting places ==
=== 2018 ===
Top international meeting countries in 2018
Rank	Country	Number of meetings
1	Singapore	1,177
2	South Korea	854
3	Belgium	849
4	United States	592
5	Japan	579
6	Austria	472
7	France	455
8	Spain	441
9	United Kingdom	329
10	Germany	296

Top international meeting cities in 2018
Rank	City	Number of meetings
1	Singapore	1,177
2	(Belgium) Brussels	733
3	(South Korea) Seoul	431
4	(Austria) Vienna	401
5	(Japan) Tokyo	313
6	(France) Paris	259
7	(Spain) Madrid	190
8	(United Kingdom) London	183
9	(Spain) Barcelona	148
10	(Switzerland) Geneva	145

=== 1999 to 2018 ===
Top international meeting countries from 1999 to 2018
Rank	Country	Number of meetings
1	United States	24,064
2	France	13,903
3	Belgium	11,838
4	Germany	11,479
5	Singapore	10,155
6	United Kingdom	9,943
7	Italy	9,920
8	Spain	9,278
9	South Korea	8,102
10	Austria	7,785

Top international meeting cities from 1999 to 2018
Rank	City	Number of meetings
1	Singapore	10,155
2	(Belgium) Brussels	9,683
3	(France) Paris	6,515
4	(Austria) Vienna	5,916
5	(South Korea) Seoul	4,291
6	(Switzerland) Geneva	3,992
7	(United Kingdom) London	3,575
8	(Germany) Berlin	3,072
9	(Spain) Barcelona	3,018
10	(Japan) Tokyo	3,012

== Publication ==
In 1923, UIA published Code des voeux internationaux, codification générale des voeux et résolutions des organismes internationaux, with a preface by Henri La Fontaine.

== See also ==
- Encyclopedia of World Problems and Human Potential
- International Congress Calendar
- International Institute of Intellectual Cooperation
- Yearbook of International Organizations
