= DSRP =

Theory and method of thinking

DSRP is a theory and method of thinking, developed by systems theorist and cognitive scientist Derek Cabrera. It is an acronym that stands for Distinctions, Systems, Relationships, and Perspectives. Cabrera posits that these four patterns underlie all cognition, that they are universal to the process of structuring information, and that people can improve their thinking skills by learning to use the four elements explicitly.

Cabrera distinguishes between the DSRP theory and the DSRP method. The theory is the mathematical formalism and philosophical underpinnings, while the method is the set of tools and techniques people use in real-life settings (notably in education).

== History ==
DSRP was first described by Derek Cabrera in the book Remedial Genius. In later writings Cabrera describes D, S, R, and P as "patterns of thinking", and expands upon the implications of these thinking skills. The DSRP theory claims to be a mathematical formalism of systems thinking and cognition, built on the philosophical underpinnings of constructivism and evolutionary epistemology. The DSRP method is used in education and has influenced educational reform as well as in management of learning organizations.

In 2008 a special section of the journal Evaluation and Program Planning was dedicated to examining the DSRP theory and method.

The 2015 self-published book Systems Thinking Made Simple is an updated treatment of DSRP.

== DSRP theory ==
DSRP consists of four interrelated structures (or patterns), and each structure has two opposing elements. The structures and their elements are:

- Making Distinctions – which consist of an identity and an other
- Organizing Systems – which consist of part and whole
- Recognizing Relationships – which consist of action and reaction
- Taking Perspectives – which consist of point and view

There are several rules governing DSRP:

1. Each structure (D, S, R, or P) implies the existence of the other three structures.
2. Each structure implies the existence of its two elements and vice versa.
3. Each element implies its opposite (e.g. identity implies other).

These rules illustrate that DSRP is a modular, fractal, nonlinear, complex systems process: the four DSRP structures do not occur in a stepwise, linear process but in a highly interdependent, complex way.

DSRP theory states that these four structures are inherent in every piece of knowledge and are universal to all human thinking, and that any piece of information can be viewed using each of these structures to gain a deeper understanding of that information. The order in which the operations take place does not matter, as all four occur simultaneously.

Gerald Midgley pointed out that the structures of DSRP have analogues in other systems theories: distinctions are analogous to the boundaries of Werner Ulrich's boundary critique; Stafford Beer's viable system model explores nested systems (parts and wholes) in ways analogous to the "S" of DSRP; Jay Wright Forrester's system dynamics is an exploration of relationships; and soft systems methodology explores perspectives.

=== Example ===
Any piece of information can be analyzed using each of these elements. For example, consider the U.S. Democratic Party. By giving the party a name, Democratic, a distinction is drawn between it and all other entities. In this instance, the Democratic Party is the identity and everything else (including the U.S. Republican Party) is the other. From the perspective of the Republican Party ("identity"), however, the Democratic Party is the other.

The Democratic Party is also a system—it is a whole entity, but it is made up of constituent parts—its membership, hierarchy, values, etc. When viewed from a different perspective, the Democratic Party is just a part of the whole universe of American political parties.

The Democratic Party is in relationship with innumerable other entities, for example, the news media, current events, the American electorate, etc., each of which mutually influence the Party—a relationship of cause and effect. The Party is also a relationship itself between other concepts, for example, between a voter and political affiliation.

The Democratic Party is also a perspective on the world—a point in the political landscape from which to view issues.

=== Formula ===
The primary application of the DSRP theory is through its various methodological tools but the theory itself is a mathematical formalism that contributes to the fields of evolutionary epistemology and cognition. The formal theory states that DSRP are simple rules in a complex adaptive system that yields systems thinking:

${ ST }_{ n }=\underset { info }{ \oplus } \underset { j\le n }{ \otimes } { \left\{ :{ D }_{ o }^{ i }\circ { S }_{ w }^{ p }\circ { R }_{ r }^{ a }\circ { P }_{ v }^{ \rho }: \right\} }_{ j }$

The equation explains that autonomous agents (information, ideas or things) following simple rules (D,S,R,P) with their elemental pairs (i-o, p-w, a-r, ρ-v) in nonlinear order (:) and with various co-implications of the rules (○), the collective dynamics of which over a time series j to n leads to the emergence of what we might refer to as systems thinking (ST).

The elements of each of the four patterns follow a simple underlying logic as do the interactions between patterns. This logic underlies the unique ability of DSRP to be characterized as multivalent, but contain within it bivalency.

$P:=\left( { e }_{ 1 }\leftrightarrow { e }_{ 2 } \right)$	A Pattern is defined as element_{1} co-implying an element_{2}		
An element_{1} exists	An element_{2} exists	element_{1} co-implies element_{2}	A Pattern exists
${ e }_{ 1 }$	${ e }_{ 2 }$	$\left( { e }_{ 1 }\leftrightarrow { e }_{ 2 } \right)$	$:=P$

$D:=\left( { i }\leftrightarrow { o } \right)$	A Distinction is defined as identity co-implying an other		
An identity exists	An other exists	identity co-implies other	A Distinction exists
${ i }$	${ o }$	$\left( { i }\leftrightarrow { o } \right)$	$:=D$

$S:=\left( { p }\leftrightarrow { w } \right)$	A System is defined a whole co-implying a part(s)		
A whole exists	A part exists	whole co-implies part	A System exists
${ w }$	${ p }$	$\left( { w }\leftrightarrow { p } \right)$	$:=S$

$R:=\left( { a }\leftrightarrow { r } \right)$	A Relationship is defined as an action co-implying a reaction		
An action exists	A reaction exists	action co-implies reaction	A Relationship exists
${ a }$	${ r }$	$\left( { a }\leftrightarrow { r } \right)$	$:=R$

$P:=\left( \rho \leftrightarrow { v } \right)$	A Perspective is defined as a point co-implying a view		
A point exists	A view exists	point co-implies view	A Perspective exists
${ \rho }$	${ v }$	$\left( \rho \leftrightarrow { v } \right)$	$:=P$

$\intercal \left( D\vee S\vee R\vee P \right) \rightarrow \left( D\wedge S\wedge R\wedge P \right)$	The existence of D or S or R or P implies the existence of D and S and R and P	
If D or S or R or P exists	Then D and S and R and P exists	One Pattern implies all the Patterns
$\left( D\vee S\vee R\vee P \right)$	$\left( D\wedge S\wedge R\wedge P \right)$	$\intercal \left( D\vee S\vee R\vee P \right) \rightarrow \left( D\wedge S\wedge R\wedge P \right)$

== DSRP method ==
DSRP as a method is built upon two premises: first, that humans build knowledge, with knowledge and thinking being in a continuous feedback loop (e.g., constructivism), and second, that knowledge changes (e.g., evolutionary epistemology). The DSRP method builds upon this constructivist view of knowledge by encouraging users to physically and graphically examine information. Users take concepts and model them with physical objects or diagrams. These objects are then moved around and associated in different ways to represent some piece of information, or content, and its context in terms of distinctions, systems, relationships, or perspectives. Once a concept has been modeled and explored using at least one of the four elements of DSRP, the user goes back to see if the existing model is sufficient for his or her needs, and if not, chooses another element and explores the concept using that. This process is repeated until the user is satisfied with the model.

The DSRP method has several parts, including mindset, root lists, guiding questions, tactile manipulatives, and DSRP diagrams.

=== Root lists ===
Root lists are simply lists of various concepts, behaviors, and cognitive functions that are "rooted in" D, S, R, or P. These root lists show the research linkages between the four universal structures and existing structures which users may be more familiar with such as categorization, sorting, cause and effect, etc.

=== Guiding questions ===
Users pose "guiding questions", of which there are two for each structure of DSRP. The guiding questions are:

- Distinctions
  - What is __________?
  - What is not __________?
- Systems
  - Does _________ have parts?
  - Can you think of _________ as a part?
- Relationships
  - Is ________ related to __________?
  - Can you think of ________ as a relationship?
- Perspectives
  - From the perspective of __________, [insert question]?
  - Can you think about ____________ from a different perspective?

== Educational outcomes ==
With continued use, the method is claimed to improve six specific types of thinking skills:

- Critical thinking improves as people learn to examine the reasoning behind the distinctions they draw and the perspectives and relationships that influence how information is presented
- Creative thinking improves as people make connections (i.e. relationships) between new pieces of information.
- Systems thinking improves as one becomes increasingly fluent with all four elements of DSRP.
- Interdisciplinary thinking improves as people reconsider boundaries (i.e. distinctions) and make connections between new pieces of information.
- Scientific thinking improves as people learn to analyze information in a logical way.
- Emotional intelligence and prosocial behavior improves as people learn to take multiple perspectives—particularly to imagine the perspectives of other people.

== Applications ==
Cabrera claims that DSRP theory, as a mathematical and epistemological formalism, and the DSRP method, as a set of cognitive tools, is universally applicable to any field of knowledge.

=== Software ===
DSRP provides the conceptual foundation for Plectica, a cloud-based application. The card structure and mapping features tacitly reference DSRP rules and provide an environment in which users can create visual maps of DSRP constructs on any topic or process.

== Criticism ==
Not all experts initially agreed that DSRP is definitive of systems thinking, as Cabrera claims. In 2008, Gerald Midgley argued that the "DSRP pattern that Cabrera et al. propose is an interpretation imposed on other perspectives, and they are prepared to dismiss concepts in those perspectives that do not fit." Midgley advocated for pragmatic methodological pluralism over unification, suggesting: "Rather than seeking to rationalise the systems thinking field, arguably they [Cabrera et al.] would be better off acknowledging that theirs is one perspective amongst many. It is then up to them to argue its coherence and utility while still keeping the door open to insights from other perspectives.".

== See also ==
- Creative problem-solving
- Critical systems thinking
- Conceptual model
- Double-loop learning
- Fallacy of misplaced concreteness
- Function model
- Higher order thinking
- Knowing and the Known
- Mental model
- Metamodeling
- Model-dependent realism
- Pattern language
- Pedagogical patterns
- Perspective (cognitive)
- Problem solving
- Structure chart
- Systems analysis
- Systems theory
- Theory of everything § Arguments against
- View model
- World Hypotheses
