= Derek Cabrera =

American systems theorist (born 1970)

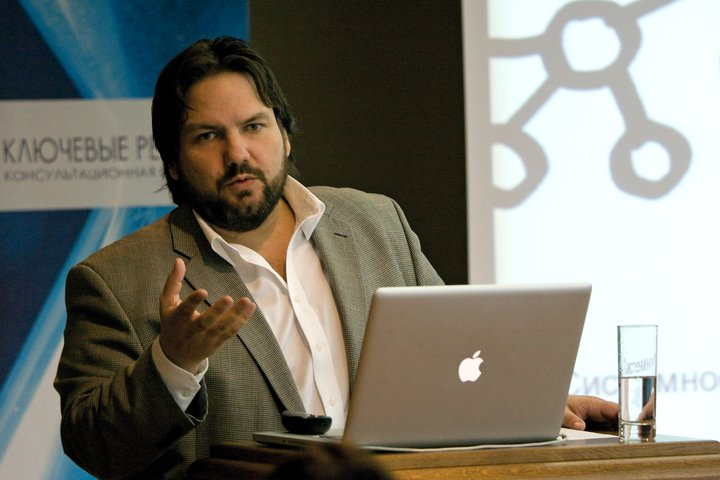
- Born: 1970 (age 55–56); United States
- Education: Cornell University (Ph.D.)
- Known for: DSRP theory and method, MetaMaps, ThinkBlocks,
- Awards: National Science Foundation IGERT fellow
- Scientific career
- Fields: Systems thinking
- Workplaces: Cabrera Research Lab, Santa Fe Institute, Cornell University, Outward Bound

Derek Cabrera (born 1970) is an American systems theorist and cognitive scientist who applies systems-based concepts to the development of models in human development and learning (education), organizational learning design, management and leadership, organizational change. Models he has formulated include DSRP, MAC (for learning design), VMCL and NFST (for organizational design). He is also the inventor of MetaMaps and ThinkBlocks.

== Biography ==
Cabrera received a Ph.D. from Cornell University with a dissertation entitled Systems Thinking.

Trained as an evolutionary epistemologist, Cabrera says that knowing how we know things is equally important to what we know, and that humans build knowledge not by merely receiving information but through the interactive, dynamic relationship between information and thinking, which he terms DSRP. His book Thinking at Every Desk expounds upon these ideas in the field of education and was republished by W. W. Norton & Company. His self-published book Systems Thinking Made Simple explains the patterns of DSRP and VMCL.

Cabrera served as a Lecturer in the Department of Education in Cornell's College of Human Ecology, where he taught a graduate-level course in systems thinking. He worked as a postdoctoral associate and co-principal investigator on an NSF-funded project at Cornell to develop evaluation tools for large-scale science, technology, engineering, and math (STEM) education programs.

He has received several awards and competitive fellowships for his work, including a National Science Foundation IGERT fellowship in nonlinear systems in the Center for Applied Mathematics and the Department of Theoretical & Applied Mechanics at Cornell University and the Association of American Colleges and Universities K. Patricia Cross Future Leaders Award.

He was a research associate at the Santa Fe Institute, where he led a team to create multimedia modules about complexity science and network theory and also developed a new model that applied systems thinking to the field of evaluation of science programs.

== Work ==
Cabrera pioneered the theory of DSRP, which states that distinctions, systems, relationships, and perspectives are foundational patterns to all human thought (cognition). D, S, R, and P are implicit in all thinking and Cabrera believes that people can improve their thinking skills by learning to explicitly recognize and explicate (e.g., metacognition) the distinctions, systems, relationships, and perspectives underlying anything they wish to understand more deeply or with greater clarity.

In 2008, a special section of the journal Evaluation and Program Planning was dedicated to examining the DSRP theory and method.

== Other activities ==
Cabrera established several non-profit and cause-based organizations, including leading fundraising for the Aceh Relief Fund after the 2004 Indian Ocean earthquake and tsunami. He co-founded an organization called Children of Rural Africa, which builds schools and community development projects in rural Nigeria.

In 2007, concerned about his experiences teaching Ivy League students who were not prepared in terms of thinking skills and abilities, Cabrera and his academic colleague Laura Colosi, also a Ph.D. and Cornell faculty, founded a movement to advance research, innovation, and public understanding of systems thinking and metacognition. Much of their early work focused in the area of education and was based on getting thinking into instruction. They created this movement to ensure that thinking skills were taught to every student nationwide and eventually worldwide. Since its founding, numerous offshoots have been created internationally, in South Korea, Singapore, and Malaysia.

Cabrera works with educators from K-12 to college and even with organizations to infuse thinking skills into existing curricula using the Patterns of Thinking method (also known as DSRP), which Cabrera created. In the DSRP method, students are encouraged to explore any given concept by recognizing and explicating the distinctions, systems, relationships, and perspectives that characterize the concept. They then physically model the concept using a tactile manipulative Cabrera invented called ThinkBlocks, or graphically represent the concept in terms of DSRP using DSRP diagrams.

In July 2014, Cabrera gave a plenary address for the 58th Meeting of the International Society for the Systems Sciences at the School of Business at George Washington University, Washington DC.

== See also ==
- Boundary critique
- Critical systems thinking
- Double-loop learning
- Function model
- Higher order thinking
- Metamodeling
- Model-dependent realism
- Systems theory
- Theory of everything § Arguments against
- View model
- World Hypotheses

== Books ==
- Cabrera, D. and Cabrera, L. (2015) Systems Thinking Made Simple: New Hope for Solving Wicked Problems. Ithaca, NY: Odyssean Press. ISBN 978-0996349307
- Cabrera, D. and Colosi, L. (2012) Thinking at Every Desk: Four Simple Skills to Transform Your Classroom. New York, NY: W.W. Norton. ISBN 978-0393707564
- Cabrera, D. (2009) Systems Thinking: Four Universal Patterns of Thinking. VDM Verlag. ISBN 978-3639156737
- Cabrera, D. (2001) Remedial Genius: Thinking and Learning Using the Patterns of Knowledge. Loveland, CO: Project N Press. ISBN 978-0970804501
