= Systems philosophy =

Philosophy discipline

Systems philosophy is a discipline aimed at constructing a new philosophy (in the sense of worldview) by using systems concepts. The discipline was first described by Ervin Laszlo in his 1972 book Introduction to Systems Philosophy: Toward a New Paradigm of Contemporary Thought. It has been described as the "reorientation of thought and world view ensuing from the introduction of "systems" as a new scientific paradigm".

== Overview ==
Soon after Laszlo founded systems philosophy it was placed in context by Ludwig von Bertalanffy, one of the founders of general system theory, when he categorized three domains within systemics namely:

1. "Systems science", which is concerned with "scientific exploration and theory of "systems" in the various sciences...and general system theory as doctrine of principles applying to all systems";
2. "Systems technology", which is concerned with "the problems arising in modern technology and society, comprising both the "hardware" of computers, automation self-regulating machinery etc., and the "software" of new theoretical developments and disciplines"; and
3. "Systems philosophy", which is concerned with "the new philosophy of nature" which regards the world as a great organization" that is "organismic" rather than "mechanistic" in nature.

Systems philosophy consists of four main areas:

1. "Systems ontology", which is concerned with what is meant by "system" and how systems are realized at various levels of the world of observation";
2. "Systems paradigms", which is concerned with developing worldviews which "takes [humankind] as one species of concrete and actual system, embedded in encompassing natural hierarchies of likewise concrete and actual physical, biological, and social systems";
3. "Systems axiology", which is concerned with developing models of systems that involve "humanistic concerns", and views "symbols, values, social entities and cultures" as "something very "real"" and having an "embeddedness in a cosmic order of hierarchies"; and
4. "Applied systems philosophy", which is concerned with using the insights from the other branches of systems philosophy to solve practical problems, especially social and philosophical ones.

The term "systems philosophy" is often used as a convenient shorthand to refer to "the philosophy of systems", but this usage can be misleading. The philosophy of systems is in fact merely the element of systems philosophy called "systems ontology" by von Bertalanffy and "systems metaphysics" by Laszlo. Systems ontology provides important grounding for systems thinking but does not encompass the essential focus of systems philosophy, which is about articulating a worldview grounded in systems perspectives and humanistic concerns.

== Origin and development of systems philosophy ==
=== The founding of systems philosophy ===
Systems philosophy was founded by Ervin Laszlo in 1972 with his book Introduction to Systems Philosophy: Toward a New Paradigm of Contemporary Thought. The Foreword was written by Ludwig von Bertalanffy.

"Systems philosophy", in Ervin Laszlo's sense of the term, means using the systems perspective to model the nature of reality, and to use this to solve important human problems (Laszlo, 1972). Laszlo developed the idea behind systems philosophy independently of von Bertalanffy's work on General System Theory (published in 1968), but they met before Introduction to Systems Philosophy was published and the decision to call the new discipline "systems philosophy" was their joint one. Writing Introduction to Systems Philosophy took five years, and in his autobiography Laszlo calls it "my major work".

Laszlo's "great idea", that made systems philosophy possible, was that the existence of a general system theory that captures the "patterns" that recur across the Systemics, who themselves capture "patterns" that recur across the specialized disciplines, entails that the world is organised as a whole, and thus has an underlying unity. In this light, nature's special domains (as characterized by the specialized sciences) are contingent expressions or arrangements or projections of an underlying intelligibly ordered reality. If the nature of this underlying unity and the way it conditions phenomenal reality could be understood, it would provide a powerful aid to solving pressing sociological problems and answering deep philosophical questions.

In the subsequent years, systems philosophy has been developed in four important ways, discussed below.

=== Laszlo and evolutionary futures ===
The first development was due to Ervin Laszlo himself, and is grounded in the concern that the way in which global resources are exploited does not take global systemic effects into account, and appears likely to have catastrophic global consequences. Work in this area is focused on developing models and interventions that can bring about human thriving in a sustainable way on a global scale. Laszlo promotes work in this area through the Club of Budapest International Foundation, of which he is the founder and President, and the journal World Futures: The Journal of General Evolution, of which he is the editor.

=== Ozbekhan and the global problematique ===
A contemporary of Laszlo, Hasan Ozbekhan in the original proposal to the Club of Rome identified 49 Continuous Critical Problems (CCPs) that intertwine to generate the Global Problematique. This work was shoved aside by the Club as too humanistic and it adopted the system dynamics approach of Jay Forrester. This decision resulted in the volume The Limits to Growth.

Ozbekhan sat down with Alexander Christakis and revisited the 49 CCPs in 1995 using the methodology of Structured Dialogic Design (SDD) which was not available in 1970. They generated an influence map that identified leverage points for alleviating the global problematique. Subsequently, an online class at Flinders University generated an influence map that bore remarkable similarities to that produced by Ozbekhan and Christakis. In 2013, Reynaldo Trevino and Bethania Arango aligned the 15 Global Challenges of the Millennium Project with the 49 CCPs and generated actions that that shows the influence among the challenges and identifies actions for addressing the leverage points.

=== Apostel and worldview integration ===
The second strand was inspired by Leo Apostel, and is grounded in the concern that disciplinary worldviews are becoming increasingly fragmented, thus undermining the potential for the inter-disciplinary and trans-disciplinary work required to address the world's pressing social, cultural and economic problems. This effort was initiated via the publication in 1994 by Apostel et al. of the book Worldviews: from fragmentation to integration. Apostel promoted this agenda by forming the Worldviews Group and founding what is now the Leo Apostel Center for Interdisciplinary Studies in the Free University of Brussels. The work of these units is focused on developing systematic models of the structure and nature of worldviews and using this to promote work towards a unified perspective on the world.

=== Midgley and systemic intervention ===
The third initiative was led by Gerald Midgley, and reflects concerns that developments in philosophy of language, philosophy of science and philosophy of sociology suggested that objectivity in modelling reality is an unattainable ideal, because human values condition what is included or excluded in any investigation ("content selection"), and condition how subjects of interest are delineated ("boundary critique"). The implication that it may be impossible in practice to obtain objective agreement about the nature of reality and about the "rightness" of theories inspired Midgley to develop practices for systemic interventions that could bypass these debates by focusing on the processes involved in making boundary judgements in practical situations. This supports systematic intervention practices that exploit, rather than trying to unify, the plurality of theories and methods that reflect different value-conditioned perspectives. This perspective is grounded in the recognition that values have to be overtly taken into account in a realistic systems paradigm, contrary to the mechanism that is still widely used in modelling the behavior of natural systems. The central text of this approach is Midgley's 2000 book Systemic Intervention: Philosophy, Methodology, Practice. This approach is now called critical systems thinking ("critical" in the sense of "reflective"), and is a major focus of the University of Hull's Centre for Systems Studies, of which Midgley is the Director.

=== Rousseau and value realism ===
The fourth development was initiated by David Rousseau, and is grounded in the concern that the value relativism dominating academic discourse is problematic for social and individual welfare, is contrary to the holistic implications of systems philosophy, and is inconsistent with universalist aspects of moral intuitions and spiritual experiences. He is promoting research towards elucidating the ontological foundations of values and normative intuitions, so as to incorporate values into Laszlo's model of the natural systems in a way that is holistic (as Apostel advocated), non-reductive (as Midgley advocates), and empirically supported (as William James advocated). Rousseau promotes this work through the Center for Systems Philosophy, of which he is the founder and Director, and collaborative projects with the University of Hull, where he is a visiting fellow in the Centre for Systems Studies and a full member of the Centre for Spirituality Studies.

== Controversies in systems philosophy ==
=== The relationship of systems philosophy to general system theory ===
The relationship of general system theory (GST) to systems philosophy (SP) has been the subject of a technical debate within the field of systems studies.

GST was presented in 1969 by Von Bertalanffy as a theory that encapsulates "models, principles, and laws that apply to generalized systems or their subclasses, irrespective of their particular kind, the nature of their component elements, and the relationships or "forces" between them. ... It [is] a theory, not of systems of a more or less special kind, but of universal principles applying to systems in general", so that the subject matter of GST is "the derivation of those principles which are valid for "systems" in general". However, by the early 1970s he was seeking to broaden the term to stand for the general subject of systems inquiry, arguing that systems science (which includes the Systemics and the 'classical' version of GST), systems technology and systems philosophy are "aspects" of GST that "are not separable in content but distinguishable in intention". This perspective is supported by modern von Bertalanffy scholars such as David Pouvreau.

An alternative perspective defends the original intent behind GST, and considers systems philosophy to be an endeavor that has a distinct objective from that of GST. This perspective follows the implications Ervin Laszlo laid out in his Introduction to Systems Philosophy, and regards systems philosophy as following up on an implication of GST, namely that there is an organized reality underlying the phenomenal world, and that GST can guide us to towards an understanding of it which systems philosophy seeks to elucidate. From this perspective GST "is the foundation upon which we can build ... systems philosophy". This view was taken up by other systems scientists such as Béla H. Bánáthy, who regarded systems philosophy as one of four distinct "conceptual domains" of systems inquiry alongside theory, methodology and application, and the systems philosopher David Rousseau, who following Laszlo reiterated that GST provides a formal model of the nature of Nature, but that an understanding of the nature of Nature requires an interpretation of GST involving concrete commitments that systems philosophy aims to provide.

David Pouvreau has suggested that this quandary can be resolved by the coinage of the new term "general systemology", to replace the usage of GST in the sense of the encompassing conception that the later Von Bertalanffy envisaged.

=== Perspectivism vs. realism in systems philosophy ===
An important debate in systems philosophy reflects on the nature of natural systems, and asks whether reality is really composed of objectively real systems, or whether the concept of "natural systems" merely reflects a way in which humans might regard the world in terms relative to their own concerns.

Ervin Laszlo's original conception of systems philosophy was as "a philosophy of natural systems", and as such to use the systems paradigm to show how nature is organized, and how that organization gives rise to the functional properties that we find exercised in the processes in Nature. However, this was immediately problematic, because it clearly is the case that natural systems are open systems, and continuously exchange matter and energy with their environment. This might make it look as if the boundary between a system and its environment is a function of the interests of the observer, and not something inherent in an actually existing system. This was taken by some to mean that system boundaries are subjective constructions, e.g., C. West Churchman argued that "boundaries are social or personal constructs that define the limits of the knowledge that is taken as pertinent in an analysis".

Ervin Laszlo acknowledged the problem without conceding to an ultimate relativism, saying "we can conceive of no radical separation between forming and being formed, and between substance and space and time…the universe is conceived as a continuum [in which] spatio-temporal events disclose themselves as "stresses" or "tensions" within the constitutive matrix…the cosmic matrix evolves in patterned flows…some flows hit upon configurations of intrinsic stability and thus survive, despite changes in their evolving environment…these we call systems." In this way Ervin Laszlo accommodated the intrinsic continuity of the cosmos understood as a plenum while insisting that it contained real systems whose properties emerge from the inherent dynamics of the universe.

Although solving social problems means taking social norms and perspectives into account, systems philosophy proposes that these problems have a "proper" solution because they are about real systems: as Alexander Laszlo pointed out, natural systems are "a complex of interacting parts that are interrelated in such a way that the interactions between them sustain a boundary-maintaining entity". In this way, the identity of a system is maintained over time despite continuing interactions with a changing environment. Systems can be destroyed or transformed, but absent radical interactions (e.g. the fission of an atom or the death of an organism) their identity is dynamically maintained by internal (autopoietic) processes. Although we can draw the boundaries around conceptual systems in ways that serve our needs or purposes, nature has (according to systems philosophy) intrinsic ways of drawing boundaries, and if we mismatch these in our models our 'solutions' might not work very well in practice.

In this way the answer to the ontological question about natural systems (do they exist?) is made conditional on epistemological virtue considerations: systems can be argued to exist if systems practice produces positive results in the real world. This debate in systems philosophy thus parallels the wider discussion in academia about the existence of a real world and the possibility of having objective knowledge about it (see e.g. the "science wars"), in which the technological success of science is often used as an argument favoring realism over relativism or constructivism. The systemic debate is far from resolved, as indeed is the case with the wider debate about constructivism, because natural systems include ones that exhibit values, purposes, and intentionality, and it is unclear how to explain such properties given what is known about the foundational nature of natural systems. This debate is therefore connected with the ones in philosophy of mind about the grounding of consciousnesses, and in axiology about the grounding of values.

== Research centers ==
- Centre for Systems Philosophy, UK
- Centre for Systems Studies, University of Hull, UK
- Club of Budapest, Hungary
- Leo Apostel Centre for Interdisciplinary Studies (CLEA), Free University of Brussels, Belgium
- Worldviews, Belgium
