= John A. Meacham =

American academic (1944–2022)

John A. Meacham (October 4, 1944 – October 14, 2022) was a SUNY Distinguished Teaching Professor Emeritus at the University at Buffalo—the State University of New York. Meacham initiated the study of prospective memory, a research subject in cognitive psychology, in the early 1970s. He also argued that wisdom is a balance between knowing and doubting and that most people lose their wisdom as they grow older. Meacham edited the international journal Human Development on theory in developmental psychology; was elected a Fellow in the American Psychological Association; served as president of the Jean Piaget Society; and taught in the Fulbright program in Bosnia and Herzegovina. Earlier publications were authored as John, more recent ones as Jack.

== Education and positions ==
John A. Meacham, also known as Jack, graduated from Stanford University (1966) and the University of Michigan with a doctorate in developmental psychology (1972). Before completing his doctorate, Meacham served in the Peace Corps in Turkey (1967–69). From 1980-82, Meacham was a member of the Center for the Study of Youth Development, Catholic University of America, Washington, D.C. He was elected a Fellow in the American Psychological Association in 1984. From 1990 to 1992, he was Associate Vice Provost for Undergraduate Education while the University at Buffalo was engaged in extensive revision of its general education program. Meacham served as president of the Jean Piaget Society from 1991 to 1993. From 1999 to 2002, he was Chair of the Department of Psychology. Meacham taught as a Fulbright scholar in the Fulbright program at the University of Sarajevo, Bosnia and Herzegovina from 2002 to 2003.

== Teaching and awards ==
Meacham taught 10,000 undergraduate and graduate students in courses on developmental psychology, childhood and adolescence, adult development and aging, history and systems of psychology, introductory psychology, American pluralism, race and racism, and world civilizations. He was awarded the SUNY Chancellor’s Award for Excellence in Teaching (1993) and the University at Buffalo Undergraduate Student Association’s Milton Plesur Award for Excellence in Teaching (1999). Meacham was promoted by the Board of Trustees of the State University of New York from Professor of Psychology to SUNY Distinguished Teaching Professor in 1999.

== Scholarly contributions ==
=== Prospective memory ===
Meacham initiated the study of prospective memory, a research subject in cognitive psychology and other fields, in the early 1970s. Prospective memory is information with implications for actions to be performed in the future, such as stopping at the store on the way home, and can be distinguished from retrospective memory, concerned solely with recall of information from the past. Meacham was the first to introduce this distinction, along with the term prospective memory, at a University of Rochester colloquium in December 1974 and subsequently at the Chicago meeting of the American Psychological Association in September 1975. Prospective memory received wide attention when Ulric Neisser included the APA paper in his 1982 edited volume, Memory Observed: Remembering in Natural Contexts.

=== The loss of wisdom ===
Meacham argued that the essence of wisdom is holding the attitude that knowledge is fallible and striving for a balance between knowing and doubting. In a chapter published in Wisdom: Its Nature, Origins, and Development (1990) Meacham wrote, "To be wise is not to know particular facts but to know without excessive confidence or excessive cautiousness. Wisdom is thus not a belief, a value, a set of facts, a corpus of knowledge or information in some specialized area, or a set of special abilities or skills. Wisdom is an attitude taken by persons toward the beliefs, values, knowledge, information, abilities, and skills that are held, a tendency to doubt that these are necessarily true or valid and to doubt that they are an exhaustive set of those things that could be known."

Thus, the challenge of being wise is to maintain the balance between acquiring more knowledge, on the one hand, and discovering new uncertainties, doubts, and questions, on the other. Meacham questioned the common belief that wisdom increases as people grow older. Instead, he argued that wisdom is accessible to people of all ages, including children; nevertheless, wisdom decreases for most people as they grow older.

=== Multiculturalism and diversity in undergraduate education ===
In the late 1980s, Meacham worked with other University at Buffalo faculty to advocate for, design, and teach American Pluralism, a required general education course on race, gender, ethnicity, social class, and religion in American society. This course quickly became a national model for multicultural and diversity courses on other college and university campuses.

Meacham’s interests turned, in the 1990s, to innovative methods for teaching and for assessing how much students have learned. He served as a consultant for the Association of American Colleges and Universities for eighteen years, including five years at the Asheville (North Carolina) Institutes on General Education (1999-2013), where he provided workshops on student-centered pedagogy, assessment of student learning, student intellectual development, and diversity in higher education. Meacham also served for a decade on the advisory board of Liberal Education, AAC&U’s flagship journal (1996-2006).

Meacham has argued that, given the importance of Islam in world history and recent American events, America’s colleges and universities should require students to become more familiar with and knowledgeable about the religion of Islam.

=== Developmental theory ===
About a fifth of Meacham’s articles and chapters, beginning in the 1970s, addressed theory in developmental psychology. From 1978 to 1987, he edited the journal Human Development, published in Basel, Switzerland and focused on developmental theory. In his earlier writing, Meacham was influenced by Klaus F. Riegel, Hans G. Furth, Paul Baltes, and Jean Piaget and, later, by Jurgen Habermas.

Recently, Meacham drew on Stephen Pepper’s World Hypotheses. Pepper describes conceptual systems with four root metaphors: formism, mechanism, contextualism, and organicism. For Meacham, these metaphors suggested contrasting perspectives on children’s actions, namely, self-reflection, behaving, interpreting, or self-organization; four perspectives on children’s voice, including self-awareness, speaking, cooperating, or conversation; and four perspectives on children’s identity, including discovering who one is, being made by others, making oneself, or growing into one’s potential.

In a 2015 chapter, Meacham used Pepper's World Hypotheses metaphors to introduce four families of theories of children’s development. For example, parents and teachers educate children by drawing forth, instructing and training, encouraging creativity, or providing conditions for growth. Similarly, children respond to education by discovering and expressing, learning and acquiring, questioning and creating, or solving problems and resolving conflicts.

=== Political polarization in America ===
In Talking Sense about Politics: How to Overcome Political Polarization in Your Next Conversation, Meacham argued that American politics is better understood not from two opposing political identities (right vs. left, conservative vs. liberal) but from four fundamental, impartial perspectives—detached, loyal, caring, and tactful—that underlie how people think about and respond to political issues. These four perspectives can be seen as similar to Pepper's World Hypotheses metaphors (formism, mechanism, contextualism, and organicism). Meacham argued that how we talk about controversial issues in American society, not changing our political institutions, is the remedy for political polarization.

== Publications ==
=== Prospective memory ===
- Meacham, J. A., & Leiman, B. (1975). Remembering to perform future actions. Paper presented at the meeting of the American Psychological Association, Chicago, September.
- Meacham, J. A., & Singer, J. (1977). Incentive effects in prospective remembering. Journal of Psychology,97, 191 197.
- Meacham, J. A., & Leiman, B. (1982). Remembering to perform future actions. In U. Neisser (Ed.), Memory observed: Remembering in natural contexts. San Francisco: Freeman. pp. 327–336.
- Meacham, J. A. (1988). Interpersonal relations and prospective remembering. In M. M. Gruneberg, P. Morris, and R. N. Sykes (Eds.), Practical aspects of memory: Current research and issues (Vol. 1). London: Wiley. Pp. 354 359.

=== Loss of wisdom ===
- Meacham, J. A. (1983). Wisdom and the context of knowledge: Knowing that one doesn't know. In D. Kuhn and J. A. Meacham (Eds.), On the development of developmental psychology. Basel: Karger. pp. 111–134.
- Meacham, J. A. (1990). The loss of wisdom. In R. J. Sternberg (Ed.), Wisdom: Its nature, origins, and development. Cambridge: Cambridge University Press. Pp. 181 211.

=== Multiculturalism and diversity in undergraduate education ===
- Meacham, J. A. (1993). Guiding principles for development and implementation of multicultural courses. Journal of General Education, 42(4), 301-315.
- Meacham, J. A. (1995). Conflict in multiculturalism classes: Too much heat or too little? Liberal Education, 81(4), 24-29.
- Meacham, J. A. (Ed.) (1996). Multiculturalism and diversity in higher education. Special issue of American Behavioral Scientist, 40(2), 105-241.
- Meacham, J. A., & Ludwig, J. L. (1997). Faculty and students at the center: Faculty development for general education courses. Journal of General Education, 46(3), 169-183.
- Meacham, J. A. (2002). Our doctoral programs are failing our undergraduate students. Liberal Education, 88(3, summer), 22-27.
- Meacham, J. A. (2015). Islam is essential for general education. Journal of General Education, 64(1), 56-64.

=== Developmental theory ===
- Meacham, J. A. (1977). A transactional model of remembering. In N. Datan and H. W. Reese (Eds.), Life span developmental psychology: Dialectical perspectives on experimental research. New York: Academic Press. Pp. 261 284.
- Meacham, J. A. (1984). The individual as consumer and producer of historical change. In K. A. McCluskey and H. W. Reese (Eds.), Life span developmental psychology: Historical and generational effects. New York: Academic Press. Pp. 47 72.
- Meacham, J. A., & Emont, N. C. (1989). The interpersonal basis of everyday problem solving. In J. D. Sinnott (Ed.), Problem solving: Theory and application. New York: Praeger. Pp. 7 23.
- Meacham, J. A. (1999). Riegel, dialectics, and multiculturalism. Human Development, 42(3), 134-144.
- Meacham, J. A. (2004). Action, voice, and identity in children's lives. In P. B. Pufall and R. P. Unsworth (Eds.), Rethinking childhood. Piscataway, NJ: Rutgers University Press. pp. 69–84.
- Meacham, J. A. (2015). Metaphors for understanding children and their role in culture. In Guner Coskunsu (Ed.), The archaeological study of childhood: Interdisciplinary perspectives on an archaeological enigma. Albany: SUNY Press. pp. 149–164.

=== Political polarization in America ===
- Meacham, Jack (2017). Talking sense about politics: How to overcome political polarization in your next conversation. Oregon: Quaerere Press.
