= Geoffrey B Saxe =

American developmental psychologist

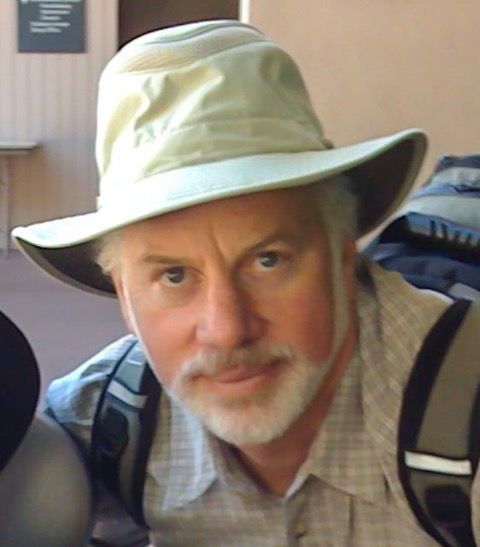
- Saxe in 2019
- Born: 1948 (age 77–78)
- Awards: 2015 Eleanor E. Maccoby Book Award American Psychological Association 2014 Stirling Prize for Best Published Book in Psychological Anthropology. American Anthropological Association 2013 Best Authored Book Award from the Cognitive Development Society 2010, 2022 Presidential Citations from the American Educational Research Association

Academic background
- Education: University of California, Berkeley (PhD), 1975; University of California, Berkeley (BA), 1970
- Website: https://culturecognition.com

Geoffrey B. Saxe (born June 12, 1948) is an American developmental psychologist. He is a Distinguished Professor of the Graduate School in the School of Education at UC Berkeley. He is a former President of the Jean Piaget Society for the Study of Knowledge and Development, elected member of the National Academy of Education, elected fellow of the American Educational Research Association, and former Editor-in-Chief of the international journal, Human Development.

Saxe's research focuses on the interplay between cultural and cognitive developmental processes in the reproduction and alteration of ideas in human communities. Using mathematics as an illustrative domain, Saxe situates his work in the collective practices of daily life. He has also extended his developmental perspective to a program of design research in mathematics education.

== Education and early life ==
Saxe grew up in Los Angeles, attending public schools along with his sister. His parents, the children of East European immigrants, became psychotherapists.

Saxe graduated from the University of California, Berkeley with a B.A. in psychology in 1970, and again, from the same institution and department, with a PhD in 1975 under the mentorship of Professor Jonas Langer. His training focused on cognitive development. Influenced by seminal developmental scholars including Jean Piaget, Lev Vygotsky, and Heinz Werner, Saxe used numerical cognition to explore issues of cognitive development in children's thinking. Subsequent to graduate studies, Saxe spent two years as a postdoctoral fellow at Children's Hospital in Boston at Harvard Medical School under the sponsorship of Peter H. Wolff as well as Harvard's Project Zero and the Boston Veteran Administration hospital with Howard Gardner as his advisor. During this postdoctoral period, he extended his training in cognitive development to atypical development and the breakdown of cognitive functioning following brain injury, again with a focus on numerical cognition as an arena for analysis.

== Research and writing career ==
Saxe's faculty appointments began in 1977, first at the Graduate Center of the City University of New York in the PhD Program in Educational Psychology. Later in 1982, he joined the faculty at UCLA, and still later, in 1997, joined the faculty at UC Berkeley as a professor in the Human Development Program of the Graduate School of Education.

=== Numerical Thought and its Development in Collective Practices of Everyday Life ===
Saxe's program of work has contributed to our understanding of the development numerical thought in different cultural communities. In a 1987 monograph, he and colleagues conducted a range of studies on the home environments and adult-child interactions in middle- and working- class communities. In home settings, they found that young children are inadvertently and sometimes purposely engaged with numerical activities by parents. They showed that not only do children adjust their activities involving number to home supports, often unwittingly, parents adjust their interactions with children in relations to their children's developing understandings. Hence children's early numerical environments constructed are dynamic and interactive, a process that supports children's acquisition of cultural forms for number representation, like counting systems, and increasingly use these forms to serve increasingly complex functions (e.g., counting to compare groups, elementary arithmetical transformations.)

In a related program of work, Saxe investigated the mathematical understandings of unschooled and schooled children who sell candy in the streets in NE Brazil during periods of a rapidly inflating economy. Through a coordination of ethnographic/observational research and quasi-experimental designs, his research revealed that largely unschooled sellers, as they plied their trade, create a distinct mathematics that is unlike school math, one rooted in different kinds of representations and ideas. Further, Saxe showed that sellers outstripped same-age schooled non-sellers in knowledge linked to their practice, like comparing ratios, and that when sellers did attend school, they made use of their out-of-school knowledge to support their understanding of school-linked math instruction.

Saxe's long-term field research project was conducted over more than a 30-year stretch of time with a remote Papua New Guinea group, the Oksapmin, who traditionally use a 27-body part counting system. The work formed the empirical basis for his book, Cultural Development of Mathematical Ideas. Through field visits (1978, 1980, 2001, 2014), he made use of archival, ethnographic, interview methods coupled with quasi-experimental designs in order to trace the interplay between historical change in the everyday numerical problems that emerged in collective practices and shifts in forms of the body system and functions that it served in daily life.

=== Design Research ===
In a second arena of research, Saxe's focus, together with colleagues, was to support children's understandings of integers and fractions, important but difficult-to-learn and hard-to-teach ideas. Through a coordination of interview, tutorial, and classroom studies. informed by prior work on collective practices and children's mathematical thinking, Saxe and colleagues developed a curriculum unit that uses the number line as a central representational context. An experimental study revealed effects for children's learning who participated in LMR classrooms, and that the curriculum provided supports for English language learners who participated in the same classrooms as their native-English speaking peers.^{[9]}

== Honors and research awards ==
Saxe's theoretical and research work received awards from diverse behavioral science disciplines. In 2013, the Cognitive Development Society awarded his book, Cultural Development of Mathematical Ideas: Papua New Guinea Studies, the best book award. The American Anthropological Association in 2014 awarded the same book the Stirling Prize for Best Published Book in Psychological Anthropology, and the American Psychological Association in 2015 awarded the same book the Eleanor E. Maccoby Book Award. In addition, for his theoretical and empirical work he received two Presidential Citations from the American Educational Research Association, the first in 2010 from President Carol D. Lee and the second, in 2022, from President Na'ilah Nasir. He has received numerous grants to support his work, including awards from the National Science Foundation, National Institutes of Mental Health, National Institutes of Education, the Fulbright organization, and private foundations, including the Spencer Foundation and Sigma Xi. He was an invited Fellow in residence at both Stanford's Center for Advanced Study in the Behavioral Sciences (2003–2004), and the Rockefeller Foundation's Bellagio center (2006). He also participated as an invited senior scholar-in-residence at the Max Planck Institute for the History of Science, Berlin, Germany (1999), and an invited fellow-in-residence at the Center for Interdisciplinary Studies (CIRADE), Université du Québec à Montréal (1995).

== Reviews ==
Saxe's 1990 book, Culture and Cognitive Development, and Saxe's 2012 book, Cultural Development of Mathematical Ideas, each received extended published reviews in major journals in fields of developmental psychology, anthropology, and education. His work in mathematics education has also received published journal reviews.

In reviewing Saxe's book, Culture and Cognitive Development, James Hiebert, from the University of Delaware writes in the journal Contemporary Psychology, "The book is pioneering it its conceptualization of the cognition-culture interface and exemplary in its presentation of informative data." In a similar vein, Roy Pea, Stanford University, in a review published in the Educational Researcher, points to the importance of the book, "[Saxe's] main achievement is the construction and exemplification of a constructivist research framework... beyond the works of Piaget or Vygotsky...— a level where culture and cognition are constitutive of one another.... Most importantly, one can imagine from the detailed example he offers how one might apply the theoretical and research framework to culture-cognition relations for other content domains." Finally, Alan Bishop of Monash University published a review in Journal for Research in Mathematics Education, where he points to the import of the book from the point of view of mathematics education when he writes, "this book could well achieve "cult" status. It is a seductive book that will appeal to many readers at different levels...It is a fascinating and rare combination of psychological and ethnographic inquiry styles....As Chevallard (1990) says, "The problem of mathematics education and culture should be everyone's concern", and Saxe's book demonstrates convincingly the truth of that statement."^{[12]}

Saxe's 2012 book, Cultural Development of Mathematical Ideas also received published reviews in journals that cut across disciplines. Professor Joseph Glick, a developmental psychologist from the Graduate Center of the City University of New York writes in the journal Human Development about the book's theoretical contribution, "This book is a tour de force in moving theory toward a fully historical, social and activity-based account of cultural and developmental change. The case presented is particular to an "exotic" (to us) group, but the theoretical apparatus developed has wide-ranging application." Professor Ellice Forman, from the University of Pittsburgh writes in Mathematical Thinking and Learning, "Cultural anthropologist Clifford Geertz proposed that "small facts speak to large issues" (1973, p. 23). In many ways, Geoffrey Saxe's new book echoes the Geertz quote. ... Saxe has assembled a dynamic documentary report of answers to the question: How are culture and cognition related? ... I would like to add that this important book provides a window into the professional career of a remarkable researcher and scholar." Professor Anna Sfard, a scholar from the University of Haifa, writes in Educational Studies in Mathematics, "The main contribution of the Oksapmin study... is in the opportunity it creates for tackling the question of how it happens that individual "cognitive leaps" propagate in space and time, amounting to cultural changes, visible on the societal-historical scale. This question is of paramount importance... I can see at least three reasons why this book is a must read for every mathematics education researcher. First, as an inexhaustible source of insights about numerical thinking and its development and also about human thinking in general, it can be trusted to provide the interested reader with a hearty serving of food for thought. Second, it is not every day that one sees a longitudinal study capturing a historical change in the making. This turns Saxe's story into something truly unique and precious. Finally, these 330 pages of the well-written text are too enjoyable a read to be missed." Finally, Professor Ashley Maynard, a psychologist from the University of Hawaii praises Saxe's theoretical and research contributions in the Journal of Cognition and Development, "Saxe is a master of theory and method in human development, and he provides a model for how to conduct contextually grounded, theoretically useful, path-breaking research that moves the field forward."

Saxe's work in mathematics education has received published commentaries. For example, Richard Lehrer from Vanderbilt University wrote about Saxe's article analyzing classroom studies of the LMR curriculum, "this research stands as a landmark of productive simplifications of complex forms of interaction in a way that is tractable for both design and analysis. As in any good design, its elegance belies its difficulty."

== Selected publications ==
- Saxe, G.B. (2012, 2014). Cultural development of mathematical ideas: Papua New Guinea studies. New York, NY: Cambridge University Press. Website for visual/video support: http://www.culturecognition.com/.
- Saxe, G. B. (1991; 2015, electronic edition). Culture and cognitive development: Studies in mathematical understanding. Hillsdale, NJ: Erlbaum. 2015, New York, London: Psychology Press (electronic edition).
- Saxe, G. B., Guberman, S. R., & Gearhart, M. (1987). Social processes in early number development. Monographs of the Society for Research in Child Development. 52(2).
