= Gerald Midgley =

British organizational theorist

Gerald Robert Midgley (born 1960) is a British organizational theorist, professor of systems thinking, director of the Centre for Systems Studies at the University of Hull, and past president (2013-2014) of the International Society for the Systems Sciences. He is known for his work on "Systemic Intervention;" which he defined as "purposeful action by an agent to create change in relation to reflection upon boundaries."

== Life and work ==
Midgley received his BA from London University, and his M.Phil and in 1992 his PhD from the City University London with the thesis, entitled. Unity and Pluralism.

From 1997 to 2003 Midgley was Director of the Centre for Systems Studies at the University of Hull. In 2003 he went to Australia to become adjunct professor at the University of Queensland, and senior science leader at the Institute of Environmental Science and Research in New Zealand. In 2004 he also became adjunct professor at the Victoria University of Wellington, and in 2007 adjunct professor at the University of Canterbury. Since 2010 back in England he is Professor of systems thinking and again director of the Centre for Systems Studies at the University of Hull.

Midgley's research interests are in the fields of philosophy, methodology and practice, especially in interrelationship between those three. With Michael Jackson, Robert L. Flood and Werner Ulrich he originated Critical systems thinking, and with Ulrich he developed the theory of boundary critique.

== Publications ==
Midgley has authored and/or edited eleven books and over 300 papers. A selection:

- 1995. Mixing methods Developing systemic intervention. Hull University, UK. Centre for Systems Studies
- 2000. Systemic Intervention: Philosophy, Methodology, and Practice. Springer, 1 sep. 2000.
- 2000. Dealing with Human Relations in Chinese System Practice. With Jifa Gu and David Campbell.
- 2001. Operational Research and Environmental Management: A New Agenda. Operational Research Society.
- 2003. Systems Thinking. Volumes I-IV. Edited by Gerald Midgley. Sage Publications Ltd.
- 2004. Community Operational Research: OR and Systems Thinking for Community Development. Kluwer.
- 2006. Systems Thinking and Complexity Science: Insights for Action. Edited with K. Richardson and W. Gregory, Boston: ISCE Press
- 2011. Forensice DNA Evidence on Trial: Science and Uncertainty in the Courtroom. With Victoria Grace, Johanna Veth and Annabel Ahuriri-Driscoll, Litchfield Park AZ: Emergent Publications

Articles, a selection

- 1996. "What Is This Thing Called CST?". In: Critical Systems Thinking 1996, pp 11–24
- 1998. "The theory and practice of boundary critique: developing housing services for older people". With Munlo I.; Brown M. in: Journal of the Operational Research Society, Volume 49, Number 5, 1 May 1998, p. 467-478
- 2000. "Systems Practice in China: New Developments and Cross-Cultural Collaborations". with Jennifer Wilby In: Systemic Practice and Action Research Vol 13, Nr 1. Febr 2000. pp. 3–9.
