= Systemic intervention =

Systemic intervention is a deliberate operation by intervening agents that seeks people to make alterations in their lives in psychology. This analyses how people deal with challenges in the contemporary era, including their power relations and how they reform relationship with others. Midgley ventured new approach to systems philosophy and social theory that could develop variety usage of the multiple strands of systemic thinking to systemic intervention. Scientific methods could be used as a segment of the intervention practice. However, it does not deal with all of the problems of systemic thinking as well as the science complexity.

== Systemic Intervention Models ==
Systemic Intervention Models looks for the awareness of other agents with the focus of counteracting issues with professionalisation when applicable. These agents could be identified as an individual person or a group of society who has the intentions accredited to them. This group does not have to share an equivalent purpose to the systemic intervention however requires a dominant intention at group-degree meaning. The action of degrading disempowerment effects and exposing agents to professional imagery broaden peoples perspective on the possibilities of developing reflective knowledge and change.

Systemic intervention encompasses action for change through a scientific perspective. Individuals view the world as interconnected with everything but with boundaries which are the limits to what humans are incapable of exploring. The theory of Systemic Intervention Models was derived from four perspectives in which are the structuralist, community psychology, deconstruction, interpretive systemology and critical system thinking. Through this, nine basis that will form the ideal Systemic Intervention Models was established.

The nine criteria are:

- The fundamental focus should be on the ambiguous phenomena
- At least two contradictory explanations of problematic phenomena need to arise
- The arising course should be emphasised through investigation of the various possible boundary judgement
- When the intervention process starts, everything should be included into the investigation (even though the obligation for operation will cause unavoidable boundaries critique
- Those affiliated with the intervention will be sought out and involved
- The reason for the intervention should be specific and made clear cut therefore, it can be disclosed to the people involved. Hence, discursive accountability would be allowed to the agents.
- The phenomena should be examined in terms of what it is, what it should be and how it can be realised
- Options between apprehensions and intervention procedure should be specifically justified
- The agents should self - reflect on the probable nature uncertainty to their role in intervening

== Critical Systems Thinking ==
Critical systems thinking is a systemic intervention's approach in which it is based on the systems thinking framework. According to Gerald Midgley, critical systems thinking is based on three 'themes for debate' for further research which are the improvement, critical awareness and methodological pluralism. However, Flood and Jackson disagreed saying that it should be called 'commitments' instead of 'themes for debate' in which Midgley was against as the word commitment implicates uncritical recognition. 'Themes for debate' explains how there are different perspectives to make it more vital and also critical engagement with various understandings within the research associations. Often referred as desire to change or development, improvement is the fundamental focus for systemic intervention. Improvement can be made by the subjects when ambitions to behaviour or physical transformation during intervention is recognised by the agent. Different stakeholders might have various views on what elements incorporate improvement. Sustainable improvement is when the positive change is made to possible indefinite future without the presence of undesired ramifications. It is important to support the improvement of critical awareness in which will allow the problems of different views on systemic intervention to be identified and also concerns on power during identifying process to be solved. Critical awareness tends to be associated with boundary judgements of what and whose perspectives are to be included in the research for systemic intervention.

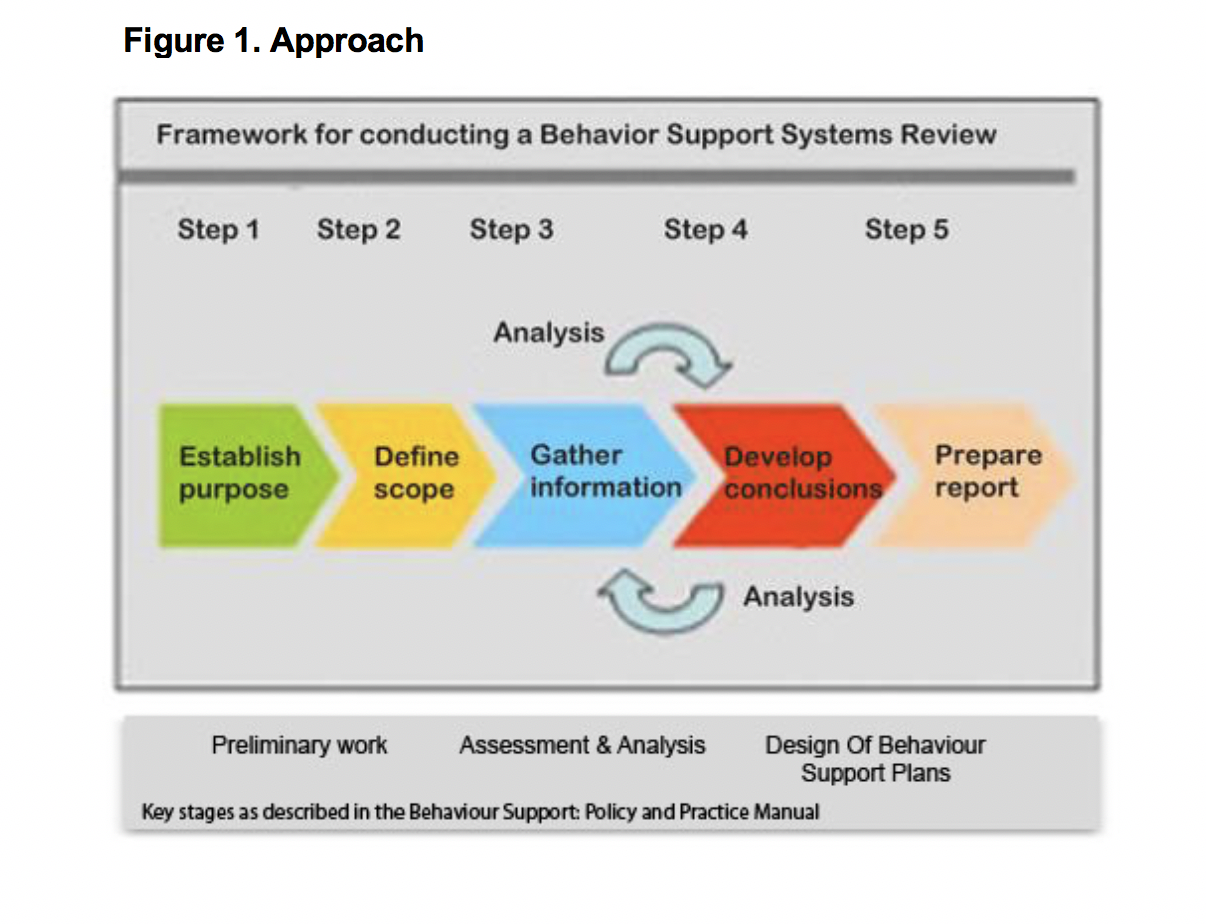
Methodology Approach

=== Methodological Pluralism ===
Due to the various approaches used for systemic intervention that are derived from aggregation of paradigms and developed for different uses, this variety is then concluded together to intensify its adaptability and efficiency in its systemic intervention performance. Methodological pluralism is essential to be embraced by the system practitioners as there are substantial sources from the various systemic interventions and methodologies have been created during the 20th century therefore it is a critical thinking for systemic intervention. Additionally, methods and methodologies epitomise various theoretical assumptions in which options between methods and theories could propose which methods is the most fitting

There are two kinds of methodological pluralism. First is learning from other methodologies to inform one's own. This allows every agents to have the capability to cultivate their own research analysis continuously by seeing methodological as vital and evolving. Furthermore, these agents could study others' developing research therefore they do not have to compete against one another.

The second kind of methodological pluralism is drawing upon and incorporation of other methodologies. This kind would result in increased flexibility and responsiveness to the systemic intervention action. Through this methodological pluralism, the various methods of systemic intervention models can be discovered and explored and hence will allow agents to strengthen their thinking resource for the systemic intervention.

== Boundary Critiques ==
The theory of boundary is to individualise the limits of what elements should be included and excluded in the analysis of systemic intervention. The terminology of boundary critiques was found by Ulrich in 1983 in which was used to refer to his own methodological practice. Ulrich stated that boundary critique should include the justification of the choices and should be rational. The systemic intervention is built upon the reflection of the boundary. This is because not everything in the universe are interconnected with others hence there are limits to what a person can do or view to a problematic phenomena. Thus, "systemic intervention is purposeful action by an agent to create change in relation to reflection on boundaries". The theory of boundary critiques illustrates the vital relationship between boundary and value judgement created by agents. This value judgement derived from the boundary, deciding on who is to be consulted and involved as well as what issues are comprised in the systemic intervention action. The most ethical systemic intervention groundwork practice is by expanding the boundary so that additional stakeholders beliefs and concerns would be accounted for.

However, Ulrich disagreed by saying that boundaries are difficult to pushed out due to the time, resources and other restraints that could interfere. He emphasised that boundary critiques are required to include the justifications of options between the boundaries and have a be a rational operations. All concerns are expressed through language in which is a fundamental tool for communication in the systemic intervention. The boundary judgments is legitimately rational only if acknowledged upon communicating together with the people involved in the intervention causing stakeholder participation to be very vital for decision making process to the boundary critiques.

=== Marginalisation Model ===
Due to the boundaries of knowledge, we reflect on it by considering marginalisation. The theory of marginalisation is concluded from different value judgement and boundaries will cause collusion within the groups of stakeholders or issues where they might be devalued or worse, obliterated. The marginalisation model will be standardised when the concerns and stakeholders are being marginalised. The process of marginalisation is significant to systemic intervention as it comprehensively analyses the critiques based on local situations by addressing the concerns with power and participation that have been neglected.

According to Midgley, when conflict between the stakeholders occurs due to the different limitations of boundary, the stakeholders may recognise two different types of boundaries. First is the primary boundaries or also known as narrower boundaries and another is secondary boundaries or also known as the wider one. This generates a liminal room between the two different boundaries in which therefore possess the marginalised components being the people and the concerns. Consequently, this process allows the sustainability of vital cohesion through the acknowledgement of 'sacred' and 'profane' conditions to the marginalised components which will augment the primary boundary when marginalised components are considered as 'profane' as well as when the secondary is regarded as 'sacred'. The standpoint will then be overlaid with societal custom that is meant to symbolically express and strengthen the stereotypes of 'sacredness' and 'profanity' set on the marginalised stakeholders and concerns.

== Gap between Current Theory and Practice ==
According to Gregory Bateson, the Systemic Intervention model is insufficient as there are inadequacy and uncertain hazards of the positive intentions behind the intervention. Churchman also had written about the lack of rational study and described the Systemic Intervention model as a meta-rational approach where people recognise both the rational and non-rational attitudes of themselves.

Extended epistemology of Heron and Reason could provide a better understanding with the inclusion of compatible elements of knowledge beyond the rational approach and might be constitute the meta-rational approach. A framework that addresses the gap is developed in which mentions four fundamentals of knowing being the experiential knowing, presentational knowing, propositional knowing and practical knowing.

Experiential knowing describes about the direct meeting where they usually are face-to-face. This allows the knowing through attendance, engagement and dynamic resonance of reality. Presentational knowing is derived from experiential knowing where the resonance is symbolised with images, vocal, verbal art illustrations, etc. This reflects the experiential knowing through the analogy use of creative making. Propositional knowing is the conceptual elements in context. For instances, knowledge by characterisation of process, entity, energy, etc. Practical knowing describes the subject knowing how to complete a task based on their competences. This is very significant as it shows the conceptual understanding, practice paradigm as well as experiential base during operation.

== Examples ==
=== Systemic Intervention for Family ===
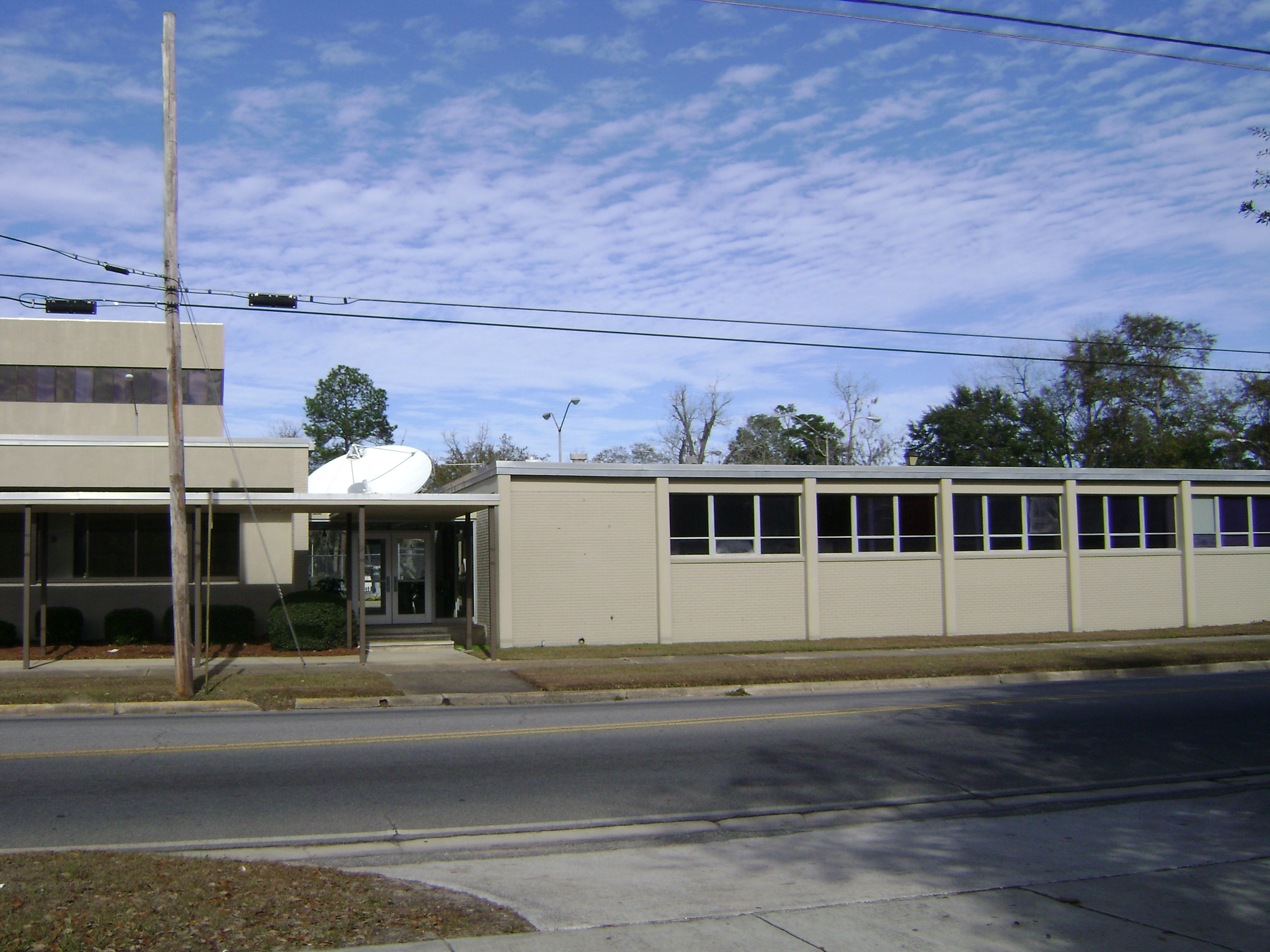
Family Therapy Clinic

In Systemic Intervention for family, people are encouraged to attend therapy and recovery camps to intervene their problems. The agents purposely made aware people aware of the intervention unlike a traditional intervention, allowing them to have the choice as to whether they want to attend or not, therefore they have more control of the willingness to participate. Generally, the agent will have several sessions with the subject and his / her family members.

An example of the systemic intervention for family is helping family member who abuse the use of either alcohol or drugs substances. Often, the family member and the addict will participate in the counselling where the addict will join alcohol and drug treatment programs whilst the other family members will attend therapy sessions in which the addict will take part in after completing its recovery program. This systemic intervention allows the better family relationship as they will learn to understand one another such as how their behaviour affect the other person, through the therapy. Furthermore, since the addicts have control of their own participation due to the awareness of the intervention hence eradicate the need to force them, there will be a high probable of them changing for the better and is a systemic intervention.
