= ThinkBlocks =

Educational tool

ThinkBlocks are a tactile manipulative educational tool invented by American educational theorist Derek Cabrera. Cabrera invented the blocks as a way to teach his graduate and doctoral students systems thinking at Cornell University. ThinkBlocks are designed to model concepts and build thinking skills based on the DSRP theory and method of thinking. This theory posits that four patterns, Distinctions, Systems, Relationships, and Perspectives, underlie all cognition, that they are universal to the process of structuring information, and that people can improve their thinking skills by learning to use the four elements explicitly. Students assign concepts to blocks by writing on them with dry-erase markers, and then associate them with other concepts by using the multi-nesting (multiple blocks inside of blocks), barbell (relational nodes), and looking glass (translucent) properties of the blocks. They were originally white, magnetic dodecahedra in three nested sizes, with one reflective side. In 2012, a new translucent cube-shaped version of the block was introduced.

ThinkBlocks were a National Parenting Center Seal of Approval Winner in Fall 2008.

== History ==
ThinkBlocks (also called DSRP Blocks for the cognitive theory upon which they are based) were invented by Derek Cabrera and debuted at the Chicago International Toy Fair in November, 2007.

At that time, ThinkBlocks were sets of opaque white magnetic, dry-erase polyhedra in three different sizes, and sold in sets of 26: 2 large, 8 medium, and 16 small blocks. The large and medium sizes were hollow, such that smaller sizes nest inside of larger ones, and the large and medium sizes also have one reflective side each.

In March, 2012, the "Thinking at Every Desk" Facebook page announced the launch of "ThinkBlocks 2.0". These new blocks are translucent non-magnetic cubes and were redesigned, in part, to work in parallel with a diagramming technique called DSRP Diagrams. Like the version 1.0 blocks, version 2.0 blocks are dry-eraseable and nesting. One large 2.0 block fits 8 medium blocks, which in turn fit 8 small blocks. Large blocks are 5 cu. in., medium blocks 2 cu. in, and small blocks 1 cu. in.

== Educational philosophy ==
ThinkBlocks can be used in multiple ways. Children can play with them as with other blocks, attaching and detaching different blocks with one another and nesting smaller blocks within larger blocks. They are also designed to be used in conjunction with the Patterns of Thinking method, as a so-called "tactile manipulative" used to model ideas. Derek Cabrera, creator of ThinkBlocks, has said that his educational philosophy has been influenced by Jean Piaget's constructivism, and ThinkBlocks reflect this, particularly when used in conjunction with DSRP/Patterns of Thinking: a child becomes an active participant in "constructing" knowledge as he or she models ideas with the blocks.

ThinkBlocks are also part of a class of educational tools called tactile manipulatives. Tactile manipulatives are popular in math subjects (especially in the elementary grades) and in Montessori education. ThinkBlocks were designed to be used in any grade and any topic thereby extending the range of use of tactile manipulatives. The linkage between the four DSRP thinking skills and tactile manipulatives appeared in Scientific American Mind in 2010.

== Applications ==
ThinkBlocks have been used extensively in pre-school, elementary, secondary, and post-secondary classroom settings, including by the Ithaca City School District in Ithaca, NY, and Fairfax County Public Schools in Fairfax County, Virginia. In addition to typically developing students, teachers have found ThinkBlocks to be particularly useful for students with emotional or learning disabilities. ThinkBlocks have also been used by organizational leaders, inventors, and scientists and in college classrooms.

The following images provide an example of how ThinkBlocks are used:
