= Kristo Ivanov =

Kristo Ivanov (born 1937-10-20) is a Swedish-Brazilian information scientist and systems scientist of ethnic Bulgarian origin. He is professor emeritus at the Department of informatics of Umeå University in Sweden.

== Biography ==
Ivanov was born in Belgrade in the Kingdom of Yugoslavia, but grew up and was educated in Italy and later in Brazil where he graduated in electronic engineering at the Instituto Tecnológico de Aeronáutica. In 1961 he moved to Sweden, where he worked as an electronic engineer in the telecommunications and computer industries, with assignments in France and the USA. In 1972 he obtained a PhD degree in informatics at the Department of Computer and Systems Sciences of the Royal Institute of Technology and Stockholm University. He has conducted further studies in political economy, business administration, and statistics, and obtained a degree in psychology at Lund University

His study led to positions at Stockholm University and Linköping University. In 1984 he was appointed to a chair as full professor of informatics (Administrative Data Processing) at Umeå University. He is professor emeritus since 2002.

From 1991 to 2004 he was a scientific advisor to the National Board of Health and Welfare (Socialstyrelsen). In 1997 he was "president-elect" of ISSS, the International Society for the Systems Sciences, a position which he later had to relinquish because of other demanding duties.

== Work ==
In his research and teaching, Ivanov focused initially on the application of systems theory to information systems and especially on practical problems of quality-control of information in industrial databases.

More specifically, his early work concentrated on the issue of accuracy and precision of databases as they are related to system development and maintenance, where the systems approach is done in terms of socially framed technical systems, conceived as a further development of the "Berkeley school" in the tradition of professor C. West Churchman.

The following are some notable ideas in Ivanov's work which eventually lead to ethical and theological organizational issues with consequences for practical applications. In order to clarify these ideas, they will be illustrated with references to Ivanov's own work and to literature upon which it relies.

=== Quality-control of information ===
This was the subject of the doctoral dissertation. It resulted in widened definitions of information accuracy and precision, that are grounded in the philosophy of science, especially theory of measurement or metrology, and its elusive but extremely important concept of error, in order to make them applicable to technical systems which are framed in a social context. Quality of data is then seen as the degree of agreement between judgments of data obtained after periodical monitored negotiations in the context of maximum possible disagreement. For this purpose, the definition of data itself, i.e. data elements and data structures in a systems context, was widened to conceive data as information and knowledge.

This part of Ivanov's work parallels, and can be seen as a theoretical contribution to groupthink, to the wisdom of crowds and the Wiki-idea itself. It required, however, some reservations for problems of social psychology as implied by the study of popular mind. Its conclusions appear to be relevant also for general data quality, information quality, accuracy and precision, and control of control, the theoretical framework for democratic security and auditing of audit whose importance become obvious in times of financial and political crisis when systemic concepts of effectiveness and progress are put into question. In particular, the concept of quality-control of information contributed to the theoretical base of the so-called Scandinavian school of participatory design as related to computer-supported cooperative work by anchoring the politically and ideologically motivated action research which flourished in the seventies to a secure scientific conception of information and systems. The concept emphasizes the fundamental role of disagreement and of what in statistics is known as outliers. In doing so it accounts for the sociopsychological and political personalistic conflict between the individual and the collective.

This early work was supposed to be completed with a comprehensive research program on the essence of computers seen as a capital-intensive industrial embodiment of the formal sciences of logic, mathematics, and geometry. The purpose was to grasp the why and the whither of the formalization of society which is hidden under an aestheticist mask of audiovisual and tactile graphical interfaces and smart human-computer interaction. One main question was whether you should care about what is presupposed and what happens when you press the button, the keyboard's tangent, or touch the screen, while innocently assuming that you are just communicating or interacting. Or is it a matter of naively understood trust? The research program could not be realized except for the production and survey of an extensive bibliography which was made available to the research community.

=== Hypersystems ===
This was a further development of the concept of social systems of the Berkeley school mentioned above, with the intent to prevent that its applications in systems design be reductively transformed into other approaches such as communicative action in the Kantian tradition, participatory design or co-design in the liberal tradition, conflict in the Marxian tradition or, lately, phenomenological and post-phenomenological postmodernism (and perspectivism, as in postmodern philosophy), social networks, actor-network theory (and its "non-modernism"), and design aestheticism.

=== Security ===
Ivanov views the problem of political power as related to privacy or personal integrity, freedom of speech, rule of law, and ethics, where the clash between privacy and security, supposedly mediated by participatory practices, portrays in terms of political science a fruitless and hopeless clash between socialist and liberal ideologies which lack a "vertical" spiritual dimension.

=== Cultural criticism ===
In later years the emphasis switched to the furthering of systems thinking in face of the perceived cultural decline of society, with emphasis on universities and research. This is a cultural criticism of inadequate uses of the system concept as well as criticism of some modern and postmodern trends in research and development of computer applications, under labels such as critical theory, phenomenology, design, or sheer eclectic ad hoc theoretical frameworks. Ivanov perceives that they are often misused to downplay not only economic and political realities but also, and mainly, ethical concerns. His criticism follows from his summarizing statement about the future of the systems approach and its limitations when technology and science lead to philosophy, and further to ethics and theology. Therefore, as emeritus, Ivanov pursues research on current trends of informatics and science to be explained or countered by an understanding of the interface between information, philosophy of technology, and theology. In this respect, and except for his adduction of theology which he shares with West Churchman, Ivanov may be seen as working along a stream of earlier criticism of the ideology of computer culture. Ivanov is convinced of the necessity of an explicit relation between theology and ethics in systems philosophy and practice, in order to avoid that technology remains an "excuse for questionable ethics" in the computer-supported edutainment and financial games of affluent societies.

== Publications ==
Ivanov published numerous articles and a few books, a selection:

- 1972. Quality-control of information: On the concept of accuracy of information in data banks and in management information systems. The University of Stockholm and The Royal Institute of Technology. Doctoral dissertation.
- 1989. "Computer applications and organizational disease". In C. W. Churchman (Ed.), The well-being of organizations (pp. 283–312). Salinas, Calif.: Intersystems.
- 1991. "Critical systems thinking and information technology". In: Journal of Applied Systems Analysis, 18, 39–55. Original research report.
- 1992. Proceedings of the 14th IRIS: Rev. papers of the 14th information systems research seminar in Scandinavia. Umeå-Lövånger, 11–14 August 1991. Umeå: Umeå University – Inst. of Information Processing. (ISSN 0282-0579.)
- 1993. "Hypersystems: A base for specification of computer-supported self-learning social systems". In C. M. Reigeluth, B. H. Banathy, & J. R. Olson (Eds.), Comprehensive systems design: A new educational technology (pp. 381–407). New York: Springer-Verlag. (NATO ASI Series F: Computer and Systems Sciences, Vol 95.)
- 1995. "A subsystem in the design of informatics: Recalling an archetypal engineer". In B. Dahlbom (Ed.), The infological equation: Essays in honor of Börje Langefors (pp. 287–301). Gothenburg: Gothenburg University, Dept. of Informatics (ISSN 1101-7422).
- 1996. "Presuppositions in information systems design: From systems to networks and contexts? Accounting". In: Management and Information Technologies, renamed Information & Organization, 5, 99–114.
- 1996. "Future foundations of inquiring systems: Reformed pragmatism or spirituality?" In J. M. Carey (Ed.), Proc. of the AIS Americas Conference on Information Systems, August 16–18, 1996, Phoenix, Arizona, USA (pp. 829–831). Pittsburgh: Univ. of Pittsburgh, Katz Graduate School of Business, Pittsburgh, PA
- Ivanov, K., & Ciborra, C. U. (1998). East and West of IS. In W. R. J. Baets (Ed.), Proc. of the Sixth European Conference on Information Systems ECIS'98, University of Aix-Marseille III, Aix-en-Provence, June 4–6, 1998. Vol. IV (pp. 1740–1748). Granada & Aix-en-Provence: Euro-Arab Management School & Institut d'Administration des Enterprises IAE. (ISBN for complete proceedings: 84-923833-0-5.) Original long version of the paper – research report.
- 2000. "Platonic information technology. Reading Plato: Cultural influences and philosophical reflection on information and technology. In: Proc. of ISTAS 2000, IEEE Int. Symposium on Technology and Society, 6–8 September 2000, Rome, Italy (pp. 163-168).
- 2001. "The systems approach to design, and inquiring information systems: Scandinavian experiences and proposed research program". In: Information Systems Frontiers, 3(1), 7-18.
- 2006. "Whither computers and systems? " In: Janis Bubenko, et al. (Eds.), ICT for people: 40 years of academic development in Stockholm. pp. 125–134.
