= Ian Mitroff =

American systems scientist

Ian Irving Mitroff (June 2, 1938 – June 17, 2024) was an American organizational theorist, consultant and professor emeritus at the USC Marshall School of Business and the Annenberg School for Communication at the University of Southern California. He is noted for a wide range of contributions in the field of organizational theory including contributions on strategic planning assumptions and management information systems, to the subjective side of the workplace and spirituality, religion, and values. He died on June 17, 2024, at the age of 86, from blood cancer.

== Biography ==
Ian Mitroff studied at the University of California, Berkeley, where he received a B.S. in engineering physics, a M.S. in structural mechanics (structural engineering), and a PhD in engineering science (industrial engineering) with the thesis entitled "A study of simulation-aided engineering design." In his PhD study he obtained a minor in the philosophy of social systems science under the direction of C. West Churchman.

Mitroff was professor emeritus at the University of Southern California, where he was the Harold Quinton Distinguished Professor of Business Policy at the Marshall School of Business. He also had a joint appointment in the Annenberg School of Communication at USC.

He served as a senior research affiliate in the Center for Catastrophic Risk Management, University of California Berkeley. He was also the president of the consulting firm Mitroff Crisis Management. Mitroff advised and influenced various academic, corporate, and government leaders in over twenty foreign countries.

Mitroff was a fellow of the American Psychological Association, the Academy of Management and the American Association for the Advancement of Science. In 1992–1993, he served as president of the International Society for the Systems Sciences. In September 2000, he was awarded an honorary doctor's degree from the faculty of social sciences of Stockholm University. In September 2006, he was awarded a gold medal by the UK Systems Society for his lifelong contributions to systems thinking. In 2020, he received a Lifetime Achievement Award from the management, spirituality, and religion division of the Academy of Management.

He published 40 books and over 250 articles.

Mitroff was a member of editorial boards for several management and social science journals. He was also a frequent guest on national radio and TV talk shows, including the Window On Wall Street (CNN Financial News), the Dick Cavett Show (CNBC, New York), Late Night America (PBS TV), Marketplace (National Public Radio), and Business Unusual (CNN Financial News).

== Work ==
Mitroff's teaching and research interests encompassed management of organizational crises, spirituality at work, and applied epistemology (complex problem solving). He published in the fields of business policy, Crisis management, Corporate culture, Contemporary media, Current events, foreign policy, Nuclear deterrence, Organizational change, Organizational psychology and psychiatry, Philosophy of science, Public policy, Sociology of science, Scientific method, Spirituality in the workplace and Strategic planning. Mitroff published over 300 articles and over 30 books.

Ian Mitroff was the founder and president of Mitroff Crisis Management. Founded in 1995, this consulting firm was composed of a national network of specialists that conducted projects in crisis management. MCM developed Crisis Management Software, which is an audit program that allows the user to perform crisis audits of their organization. It can be downloaded onto a desktop and is also available in app form. MCM also offered organizations customized workshops that are tailored to the organization's needs based on their crisis audit. It is a one-day course that focuses on critical thinking; the courses that are offered are "Systems Thinking and the Error of the Third Kind," "Inquiry Systems," and "Crisis Management." These workshops are designed to help organizations better their ability to plan and prepare for crises, formulate plans to address crises when they occur, and learn from and prevent them in the future. MCM also offers an interactive board game, "Crisis Prone or Prepared," that walks the user through crisis situations before, during, and after they happen, and how to handle events as they arise. Many top companies, including Dow Chemical, American Red Cross, Hewlett Packard, Los Angeles Police Department, and Kraft General Foods, have utilized MCM's resources.

Mitroff was also the creator of Mitroff's Five Stages of Crisis Management. This model is a comprehensive guide for crisis management and consists of five mechanisms, or stages.

- The first is Signal Detection. This step details how organizations can prepare for and prevent crises before they occur by closely monitoring for early warning signs of a potential crisis.
- The second mechanism is Probing and Prevention, or Prevention/Preparedness. The probing aspect involves actively searching for risk factors, and prevention is taking measures to reduce any potential for damage.
- Damage Containment is exactly what it is named. This step teaches organizations how to properly contain damage caused by a crisis and keep it from spreading and contaminating other areas.
- Recovery is the second-to-last step, and this stresses returning to normal operations and systems as soon as it is feasibly possible and appropriate to do so.
- The last step is Learning. The crisis should be reviewed thoroughly, including how it happened and how the organization handled the crisis. Then the review should be comprehensively analyzed and critiqued so the organization can improve its crisis management skills for inevitable future crises.

Ian Mitroff authored more than 25 books, but one of his most celebrated works is his book, Managing Crises Before They Happen: What Every Executive Needs to Know about Crisis Management. It was co-authored with Gus Anagnos, and its theme is equipping organizational leaders with the right tools to better prepare for and detect crises before they happen. It begins with a detailed description of what a crisis is and the general components of an effective framework for crisis management. It then differentiates between types of crises and how to manage each one effectively. The book gives instructions and advice on how to detect early warning signs of a crisis and create and utilize crisis scenarios in order to prevent, or if inevitable, prepare for them. Unfortunately, crises cannot always be avoided, so Mitroff gives guidelines for organizations to handle them when they arise. Some vital suggestions include always being honest and upfront about the situation and assuming full responsibility. The book is an excellent resource for any organizational leader looking to increase their preparedness for crisis situations and management.

== Selected publications ==
- Mitroff, Ian I. The subjective side of science: A philosophical inquiry into the psychology of the Apollo moon scientists. Elsevier Scientific Pub. Co. (1974).
- Mason, Richard O., and Ian I. Mitroff. Challenging strategic planning assumptions: Theory, cases, and techniques. New York: Wiley, 1981.
- Mitroff, Ian I. Stakeholders of the organizational mind. San Francisco: Jossey-Bass, 1983.
- Mitroff, Ian I., and Harold A. Linstone. The unbounded mind: Breaking the chains of traditional business thinking. Oxford University Press, 1993.
- Mitroff, Ian I., and Elizabeth A. Denton. A spiritual audit of corporate America: A hard look at spirituality, religion, and values in the workplace. Vol. 140. Jossey-Bass, 1999.

Articles, a selection:

- Mason, Richard O.; Mitroff, Ian I. (1973). "A program for research on management information systems". Management Science. 19 (5): 475–487. doi:10.1287/mnsc.19.5.475.
- Pondy, Louis R.; Mitroff, Ian I. (1979). "Beyond open system models of organization" (PDF). Research in Organizational Behavior. 1 (1): 3–39. Archived from the original (PDF) on 2012-10-21.
- Mitroff, Ian I., and Elizabeth A. Denton. "A study of spirituality in the workplace." The Sloan Management Review Association. Retrieved from: http://www. freebizplan. org/business_strategies/spirituality. htm (2013).
