= Harold A. Linstone =

German-American mathematician

Harold Adrian Linstone (15 June 1924 – 8 July 2016) was a German-American mathematician, consultant, futurist and University Professor Emeritus of Systems Science at Portland State University and a specialist in applied mathematics.

== Biography ==
Harold Linstone was a naturalized citizen of the United States born in Hamburg, Germany in 1924. He received an M.A. from Columbia University and a PhD from the University of Southern California, both in mathematics.

Linstone worked for twenty-two years in industry, which included positions at Hughes Aircraft and Lockheed Corporation since 1963, where he was Associate Director of Corporate Planning - Systems Analysis since 1968. He has been a consultant to many organizations, including the US House of Representatives, State of Alaska oil Spill Commission, Alberta Economic Development Commission, and UN Asian-Pacific center for Technology Transfer, as well as corporations such as IBM and United Airlines.

Later he worked as university professor of systems science at Portland State University, where from 1970 to 1977 he served as director of its Systems Science PhD Program and Futures Research Institute. He served as visiting professor at the University of Rome, the University of Washington, and Kiel University in West Germany.

Harold Linstone was editor-in-chief of the professional journal "Technological Forecasting and Social Change", which he founded in 1969, and which is now in its 56th volume. In 1993 to 1994 he served as president of the International Society for the Systems Sciences. In 2003 he won the World Future Society's Distinguished Service Award.

He died on 8 July 2016 in Pasadena, California.

== Work ==
=== The Delphi Method, 1975 ===
According to Linstone and Murray Turoff (1975) the concept underlying the Delphi method is developed in defense research by the Rand Corporation sponsored by the US Air Force, which started in the early 1950s. The original goal of the research project was "obtain the most reliable consensus of opinion of a group of experts ... by a series of intensive questionnaires interspersed with controlled opinion feedback."

The most noted outcomes were published in the 1962 memorandum of the Rand Corporation, entitled "An experimental application of the Delphi method to the use of experts" by Norman Dalkey and Olaf Helmer, republished under the same title in Management science in 1963. The research had started a decade earlier, and was published earlier in the RAND Memorandum, entitled "The Use of Experts for the Estimation of Bombing Requirements." It concerned the application of "expert opinion to the selection, from the point of view of a Soviet strategic planner, of an optimal U. S. industrial target system and to the estimation of the number of A-bombs required to reduce the munitions output by a prescribed amount."

Linstone and Turoff (1975) further explained that "it is interesting to note that the alternative method of handling this problem at that time would have involved a very extensive and costly data-collection process and the programming and execution of computer models of a size almost prohibitive on the computers available in the early fifties. Even if this alternative approach had been taken, a great many subjective estimates on Soviet intelligence and policies would still have dominated the results of the model. Therefore, the original justifications for this first Delphi study are still valid for many Delphi applications today, when accurate information is unavailable or expensive to obtain, or evaluation models require subjective inputs to the point where they become the dominating parameters. A good example of this is in the "health care" evaluation area, which currently has a number of Delphi practitioners."

=== Multiple Perspectives for Decision Making, 1984 ===
The 1984 book Multiple Perspectives for Decision Making, again co-authored with Ian Mitroff, presented a multiple perspective approach for decision making. This work was based on ideas of Graham T. Allison, published in his Essence of Decision: Explaining the Cuban Missile Crisis from 1971. Linstone (1999) explained:

Allison had seen that his analysis and modeling for corporate decision making only took into account some of the factors vital in the corporate decision process and Allison’s work examined the missile crisis from three different points of view, rational actor, organizational process, and bureaucratic politics. Each provided insights not obtainable with the others.

Combined with his own experience in the aerospace industry, Linstone & Mitroff distinguished three types of perspectives for decision making. At first the Technical Perspectives (T), with the characteristics:

- Problems are simplified by abstraction, idealization, and isolation from the real world around us. There is the implicit assumption that the processes of reduction and simplification permit "solution" of problems.
- Data and models comprise the basic building blocks of inquiry. Logic and rationality as well as objectivity are likewise presupposed. Order, structure, and quantification are sought wherever possible. Observation and model building, experimentation and analysis are usually aimed at improving predictive capability. Validation of hypotheses and replicability of observations and experiments are expected. The attainment of elegant models and best or optimal solutions is particularly prized.

Second The Organizational Perspectives (O), which "focuses on process rather than product, on action rather than problem-solving. The critical questions are 'does something need to be done, and if so, what?' and 'who needs to do it and how?' rather than 'what is the optimal solution?' There must be a recognition that top-down imposition of solutions may well fail if there is no 'bottom-up' support."

And third the Personal Perspectives (P), which "views the world through a unique individual. It sweeps in aspects that relate individuals to the system and are not captured by technical and organizational perspectives."

Later Linstone further developed this approach to decision making, and presented it in his 1999 Decision Making for Technology Executives: Using Multiple Perspectives to Improve Performance.

== Publications ==
Books published by Linstone:

- 1975. The Delphi Method. Edited with Murray Turoff. Addison-Wesley. (online)
- 1976. Futures Research: New Directions. Edited with W. H. Clive Simmonds. Mass. : Addison-Wesley Pub. Co.
- 1977. Technological Substitution: forecasting techniques and applications. Edited with Devendra Sahal. New York : Elsevier Pub. Co.
- 1984. Multiple Perspectives for Decision Making : bridging the gap between analysis and action. North-Holland : Elsevier Science Pub. Co.
- 1993. The Unbounded Mind : breaking the chains of traditional business thinking. With Ian Mitroff. New York : Oxford University Press.
- 1994. The Challenge of the 21st Century: managing technology and ourselves in a shrinking world. With Ian I. Mitroff . Albany : State University of New York Press.
- 1999. Decision making for technology executives : using multiple perspectives to improved performance. Boston : Artech House.
