= Klaus F. Riegel =

German psychologist

Klaus F. Riegel (November 6, 1925 in Berlin, Germany – July 3, 1977 in Ann Arbor, United States) was professor of psychology at the University of Michigan from 1959 to 1977. His research and theory contributions encompassed psycholinguistics, gerontology, developmental psychology, and dialectical psychology. Riegel edited the international journal Human Development from 1970 to 1977. In 1975, the Gerontological Society of America presented Riegel with the Robert W. Kleemeier Award for outstanding research in the field of gerontology.

== Education and positions ==
Klaus Riegel worked as a metal worker in a shipyard until he was admitted to the University of Hamburg, Germany, where he studied under Curt Bondy (who was a student of William Stern (psychologist)) and received a degree in psychology. In 1955 he earned his Master of Arts degree at the University of Minnesota. Riegel earned his Doctor of Philosophy at the University of Hamburg in 1958. In 1959, he joined the faculty at the University of Michigan Department of Psychology, where he participated in the Psycholinguistics Program, the Institute of Gerontology, and the Center for Human Growth and Development.

== Contributions ==
Riegel contributed to the growth of developmental psychology. He published and edited numerous journal articles on psycholinguistics, the history and philosophy of the social sciences, and the development and assessment of intellectual functions of older adults. In 1956, Riegel started a cross-sectional and longitudinal study on the effects of aging on intelligence. Research from the cross-sectional study became the basis for the terminal drop hypothesis, in which a decline in cognitive performance or behavior occurs in older adults five years prior to death.

From 1970 forward, Riegel advocated a new, integrated, and comprehensive psychology based on dialectics. At the heart of Riegel's dialectical psychology is his observation that traditional psychology retains a strong commitment to the belief that traits and abilities remain stable, and to the concepts of balance and equilibrium, as in dissonance theory. From Riegel's dialectical perspective, change and development are a result of contradictions, or crises, between events occurring in biological, psychological, or cultural-historical progressions. These progressions do not preexist independent of each other; instead, the nature of each is determined by its relationships with all the others. The resolutions of these contradictions, or crises, provide the basis for further development—both positive and negative—in the individual and in the history of society.

A principal forum for Riegel's elaboration of dialectical psychology was the Life-Span Developmental Psychology Conferences hosted by West Virginia University, at which Riegel was both a contributor and an active participant. The major development of Riegel's dialectic psychology took place in conjunction with a series of annual conferences on dialectics, initiated and guided by Riegel. The first of these was held at the University of Rochester in 1974. Conferences were held in the following gears at York University in Toronto, at Cape Cod, at Shimer College in Illinois, and again in 1978 in Toronto. Many of Riegel's articles and chapters from this period were incorporated into two books, both published posthumously. The first of these, Psychology Mon Amour: A Countertext, was published in 1978; the second, Foundations of Dialectical Psychology, was published in 1979 in English and in 1980 in German.

== Awards, honors, distinctions ==
Riegel edited the international journal Human Development, published by Karger in Basel, Switzerland, from 1970 to 1977. He was the president of the Psychological and Social Sciences Section of the Gerontological Society of America and served on the executive committee of the International Society for the Study of Behavioural Development. Riegel was elected as a Fellow in both the Gerontological Society and the American Psychological Association for his contributions to gerontology. In 1975, the Gerontological Society of America presented Riegel with the Robert W. Kleemeier Award for outstanding research in the field of gerontology.

== Publications ==
=== About Klaus Riegel ===
- Editorial Board and Publisher (1977). In memoriam Klaus F. Riegel November 6, 1925 - July 3, 1977. Human Development, 20, 317–325.
- Hardesty, F. P., Baltes, P. B., Birren, J. E., Freedle, R.O., Overton, W.F., & Meacham, J. A. (1978). Human Development, 21(5/6), 346–369.
- Meacham, J. A. (1999). Riegel, dialectics, and multiculturalism. Human Development, 42(3), 134–144.
- Youniss, James (1999). Giving the discipline new life and overcoming fruitless dualities. Human Development, 42, 145–148.

=== By Klaus Riegel ===
- Riegel, K. F. (1959). A study of verbal achievements of older persons. Journal of Gerontology, (14), 453–456.
- Riegel, K. F., & Riegel, R. M. (1960). A study on changes of attitudes and interests during later years of life. Vita Humana, (3),177-206.
- Riegel, K. F., & Riegel, R. M. (1964). Changes in associative behavior during later years of life: A cross-sectional analysis. Vita Humana, 7(1), 1-32.
- Riegel, K. F., Riegel, R. M., & Wendt, D. (1962). Perception and set: A review of the literature and a study of the effects of instructions and verbal habits on word recognition thresholds of young and old subjects. Acta Psychologica, Amsterdam, 20(3), 224–251. doi:10.1016/0001-6918(62)90020-3
- Riegel, K. F., & Riegel, R. M. (1972). Development, drop, and death. Developmental Psychology, 6(2), 306–319. doi:10.1037/h0032104
- Riegel, K.F. (1972). The influence of economic and political ideologies upon the development of developmental psychology. Psychological Bulletin, 78: 129–141.
- Riegel, K.F. (1973). Developmental psychology and society. Some historical and ethical considera¬tions. In Nesselroade and Reese (Eds.), Life-span developmental psychology: Methodological issues. New York: Academic Press, pp. 1–23.
- Riegel, K.F. (1975). Adult life crises. Toward a dialectic theory of development; in N. Datan and Ginsberg (Eds.), Life-span developmental psychology: Normative life crises. New York: Academic Press, pp. 97–124.
- Riegel, K.F. (1975). Toward a dialectic theory of development. Human Development, 18: 50- 64.
- Riegel, K.F. (1976). From traits and equilibrium toward developmental dialectics; in Arnold and Cole (Eds.),1974-75 Nebraska Symposium on Motivation. Lincoln: University of Nebraska Press, pp. 349–407.
- Riegel, K.F. (1976). The dialectics of human development. American Psychologist, 31, 689–700.
- Riegel, K.F. (1978). Psychology mon amour: A counter-text. Boston: Houghton-Mifflin.
- Riegel, K.F. (1979). Foundations of dialectical psychology. New York: Academic Press (1980. Stuttgart: Klett).
