= C. West Churchman =

American philosopher and systems scientist

Charles West Churchman (29 August 1913 – 21 March 2004) was an American philosopher and systems scientist, who was Professor at the School of Business Administration and Professor of Peace and Conflict Studies at the University of California, Berkeley. He was internationally known for his pioneering work in operations research, system analysis and ethics.

== Biography ==
Churchman was born in 1913 in Mount Airy, Philadelphia, to Clark Wharton Churchman and Helen Norah Fassitt, descendants of Philadelphia Main Line families. His first intellectual love was for philosophy and this far-ranging love for wisdom captivated him to the end of his life. He studied philosophy at the University of Pennsylvania, where he was admitted to the Zeta Psi fraternity. He earned a bachelor's degree in 1935, a master's in 1936, and a PhD in 1938, all in philosophy. One of his teachers was Edgar A. Singer, who had been a student at Harvard of the philosopher and psychologist William James.

Before completing his dissertation, in 1937, he became Instructor of Philosophy, also at the University of Pennsylvania. Churchman's dissertation was ultimately completed under Henry Bradford Smith, titled "Towards a General Logic of Propositions" (1938). Upon finishing his degree, he was appointed assistant professor at the university. During World War II, Churchman headed the mathematical section of the U.S. Ordnance Laboratory at the Frankford Arsenal in Philadelphia and devised a way to test small arms ammunition and detonators based on the statistical methods of bioassay. He also investigated the theory of detonation, applying high-speed photography. In 1945, back in Pennsylvania he was elected Chairman of the Department of Philosophy. In 1951, Churchman moved to the Case Institute of Technology in Cleveland, Ohio, and until 1957 he was Professor of Engineering Administration at Case. In 1957, he joined the faculty of the University of California, Berkeley and remained there as Professor Emeritus after his retirement.

During 1946–1954, he served as the secretary and program chairman of the American Philosophy of Science Association. He is a fellow of the American Association for the Advancement of Science. Churchman was a founding member of TIMS, now INFORMS, and was its ninth president in 1962. In 1989, Churchman was elected president of the International Society for the Systems Sciences.

Churchman edited the journal Philosophy of Science for a long period beginning in 1948. He was also the first editor-in-chief of the journal Management Science in 1954.

Churchman has been cited by Noam Chomsky as the only professor from whom he learned anything as an undergraduate. European students of C. West Churchman are Werner Ulrich and Kristo Ivanov who developed his work in related fields and contributed to its diffusion in Europe. American students of Churchman who have documented their understanding and application of his work are Ian Mitroff and Richard O. Mason

Churchman died in 2004 in Bolinas, California.

== Work ==
Churchman made significant contributions in the fields of management science, operations research and systems theory. During a career spanning six decades, Churchman investigated a vast range of topics such as accounting, research and development management, city planning, education, mental health, space exploration, and peace and conflict studies.

Churchman became internationally recognized due to his then radical concept of incorporating ethical values into operating systems. Hasan Ozbekhan, his friend, in The Predicament of Mankind proposal to the Club of Rome incorporated ethical values in the 49 Continuous Critical Problems that constitute the Global Problematique. The proposal was not accepted because it was "too humanistic"

== Personal life ==
His wife Gloria Churchman died in 2009.

"He was a tremendous teacher. People would flock to his class," Gloria Churchman said. "He always kept you on the edge of your chair, because he was a very, very exciting lecturer. He had students from everywhere, all over the world."

Professor Churchman and Gloria Churchman are survived by their son Daniel Wharton Churchman (Josh) of Bolinas, his daughter-in-law Joy Churchman and two grandchildren, Jenna and Kyle Churchman.

== Recognition ==
Churchman's honors include the Academy of Management’s Best Book in Management Award and the McKinsey Book Award, both in 1968. In 1965 he was elected as a Fellow of the American Statistical Association. His work was further honored through three honorary doctorates given to him by the Washington University in St. Louis in 1975, the University of Lund, Sweden in 1984, and the Umeå University, Sweden in 1986. In 1983, Churchman received the Berkeley Citation, one of the campus's highest awards. In 1999 he received the LEO Award for Lifetime Exceptional Achievement in Information Systems. He was elected to the 2002 class of Fellows of the Institute for Operations Research and the Management Sciences.

The West Churchman Memorial Prize was awarded in 2014, during the 10th Brazilian Congress of systems, conducted by CORS - USP, after a selection carried out by an editorial committee, composed of researchers from several countries. The purpose of it was to provide recognition to an important systemic research work developed within the highest ethical and methodological standards as advocated C. West Churchman.

== Publications ==
Churchman wrote some 15 books and edited another 9 books:

- 1938, Towards a General Logic of Propositions, Ph.D. Dissertation.
- 1940, Elements of Logic and Formal Science, J.B. Lippincott Co., New York.
- 1940, Euclid Vindicated of Every Blemish, Translator, Saccheri's.
- 1946, Psychologistics, with Russell L. Ackoff.
- 1948, Theory of Experimental Inference, Macmillan Publishers, New York.
- 1950, Methods of Inquiry: Introduction to Philosophy and Scientific Method, with Russell L. Ackoff, Educational Publications, St. Louis, Missouri, Missouri.
- 1956, Costs, Utilities, and Values, Sections I and II.
- 1957, Introduction to Operations Research, with Russell L. Ackoff & E.L. Arnoff, J. Wiley and Sons, New York.
- 1960, Prediction and Optimal Decision, Prentice Hall, Englewood Cliffs, New Jersey.
- 1968, Challenge to Reason, McGraw-Hill, New York.
- 1968/1979, The Systems Approach, Delacorte Press, New York.
- 1971, The Design of Inquiring Systems, Basic Concepts of Systems and Organizations, Basic Books, New York.
- 1975, Thinking for Decisions: Deductive Quantitative Methods, Science Research Associates, Chicago, Illinois.
- 1979, The Systems Approach and Its Enemies, Basic Books, New York.
- 1982, Thought and Wisdom; The Gaither Lectures, Intersystems Publications, Seaside, California.

Books edited by C. West Churchman.

- 1947, Measurement of Consumer Interest, ed. with Russell L. Ackoff, and M. Wax.
- 1959, Measurement: Definitions and Theories, ed. with P. Ratoosh.
- 1959, Experience and Reflection by Edgar A. Singer, Jr., ed.
- 1960, Management Sciences, ed. with M. Verhulst.
- 1975, Systems and Management Annual 1975, ed.
- 1976, Design Methods and Theories, ed.
- 1976, World Modelling: A Dialogue, ed. with R.O. Mason.
- 1984, Natural Resources Administration: Introducing a New Methodology for Management Development, ed. with A.H. Rosenthal, and S.H. Smith.
- 1989, The Well-Being of Organizations, ed.
- 2011, The Permanent Revolution in Science. Richard L. Schanck and C. West Churchman, (Reissue of 1954 book). New York, Philosophical Library, Introduction by C. West Churchman.

== See also ==
- Boundary critique
- Co-design
- Formal science
- Debora Hammond
- Werner Ulrich
- Kristo Ivanov
- Umeå University
- Ludwig von Bertalanffy
- Wicked problem
