= Stephen Pepper =

American philosopher (1891–1972)

Stephen Coburn Pepper (April 29, 1891, Newark, New Jersey – May 1, 1972, Berkeley, California) was an American pragmatist philosopher who was the Mills Professor of Philosophy at the University of California at Berkeley. He may be best known for World Hypotheses: A Study in Evidence (1942) but was also a respected authority on aesthetics, philosophy of art, and ethics.

Pepper received his bachelor's degree (1913) and his doctorate in philosophy from Harvard University (1916). He trained under Ralph Barton Perry, a noted critical realist. He taught primarily at the University of California at Berkeley, from 1919 to 1958.

== Works ==
=== World hypotheses ===
Pepper may be best known for World Hypotheses: A Study in Evidence (1942), in which he presented four relatively adequate world hypotheses (or world views or conceptual systems) in terms of their root metaphors: formism (similarity), mechanism (machine), contextualism (historical act), and organicism (living system). He also developed contextualism into a world hypothesis, focusing on the criterion of beauty as an "aesthetic quality", which he conceptualized as the immediately felt wholeness of a social context that precede subject-object dualism. One of the thinkers he influenced was Thomas Kuhn, who joined as a junior faculty member at Berkeley during his tenure. Scholars have made comparisons between Pepper's world hypotheses and the Kuhnian paradigms.

=== Aesthetics ===
Pepper was also a respected authority on aesthetics, philosophy of art, and ethics, publishing a dozen books and more than a hundred articles. At the University of California he served as chair of the art department and, subsequently, as chair of the philosophy department. Pepper was the Mills Professor of Philosophy, an endowed chair. At the university, he was noted for opposing the functional and aesthetic deterioration of the institution due to the construction of new buildings.

== See also ==
- World Hypotheses

== Publications ==
- Duncan, Elmer H.(1970). Stephen C. Pepper: A bibliography. The Journal of Aesthetics and Art Criticism, 28(3), 287-293.
- Efron, A. (1980). Pepper's continuing value: In A. Efron & J. Herold (Eds.), Root metaphor: The live thought of Stephen C. Pepper. Paunch, No. 53-54, 5-53.
- Pepper, S. C. (1942). World hypotheses: A study in evidence. Berkeley, CA: University of California Press.
