= Norma Romm =

Norma Romm is a South African critical systems thinker interested in transformative research. She is a professor at the Department of Adult, Community, and Continuing Education at the University of South Africa.

She was previously Dean of the Faculty of Social Sciences, University of Swaziland and deputy director of the Centre for Systems Studies, at the University of Hull.

== Works ==
- The Methodologies of Positivism and Marxism (1991) London: Macmillan
- Accountability in Social Research (2001) Springer
- New Racism: Revisiting Researcher Accountabilities (2010) Springer
- Responsible Research Practice: Revisiting Transformative Paradigm in Social Research (2018) Springer
- Transformative-Oriented Research Options from Africa: Appreciating Indigenous Ways of Knowing (Selected Writings). (2026). The Taos Institute.
