= Terminal drop hypothesis =

Medical sign of impending death

In medicine, the terminal drop hypothesis is a hypothesis that a sharp reduction in cognitive capacity in older people is often correlated with impending death, typically within five years.

== See also ==
- Dementia
