= Mike Jackson (systems scientist) =

British systems scientist, consultant and Emeritus Professor

Michael Christopher Jackson OBE (born 1951) is a British systems scientist, consultant and Emeritus Professor of Management Systems and former Dean of Hull University Business School, known for his work in the field of systems thinking and management.

== Biography ==
Jackson studied Politics, Philosophy and Economics at Oxford University from 1970 to 1973, where he received his PPE. After spending 4 years in the civil service, he received his MA in Systems in Management at the Lancaster University in 1978.

Jackson spent his academic life teaching at the Lancaster University, the University of Warwick, the University of Lincoln and the Hull University, appointed Professor of Management Systems in Hull from 1989 to May 2012. He was Visiting Professor at the Indian Institute of Technology (New Delhi) and Honorary Professor at the Universidad Ricardo Palma, Lima, Peru. In 1997 he was an Erskine Scholar at the University of Canterbury, New Zealand.

Jackson is a past President of the UK Systems Society, of the International Federation for Systems Research from 1996 to 2000, and of the International Society for the Systems Sciences in 2001. He has also served on the Council of the Operational Research Society. He is a Fellow of the British Computer Society, the Chartered Management Institute, the Cybernetics Society and the Operational Research Society.

Jackson is Editor-in-chief of the journal Systems Research and Behavioral Science, published by John Wiley, and he is on the editorial board of 5 other journals. He has delivered plenary addresses at numerous international conferences, and has undertaken many consultancy engagements with outside organisations, both commercial and non-profit.

In 2009, his work was honored from the Hellenic Society for Systemic Studies with their most prestigious Medal. He was appointed Officer of the Order of the British Empire (OBE) in the 2011 New Year Honours for services to higher education and business. In 2017 he received the Beale Medal of the Operational Research Society for ‘an outstanding lifetime achievement in the philosophy, methodology or practice of OR’.

== Work ==
Jackson's teaching and research interests are Systems thinking, Organizational cybernetics, Creative problem solving, Critical systems thinking, Management science and Systems science.

== Publications ==
Jackson has written six books, edited 6 others and has published over 70 articles in refereed journals, Books:

- 1991, Systems Methodology for the Management Sciences.
- 1991, Creative Problem Solving: Total Systems Intervention, with Robert L. Flood, Wiley. 268 p.
- 2000, Systems Approaches to Management, London: Springer 465 p.
- 2003, Systems Thinking: Creative Holism for Managers, Wiley.
- 2019, Critical Systems Thinking and the Management of Complexity, Wiley.
- 2024, Critical Systems Thinking: A Practitioner's Guide, Wiley

Articles, a selection:

- 1993, with Robert L. Flood, "Critical Systems Thinking", in: Organization Studies Vol 14, p. 613.
