= Human Development (journal) =

- Discipline: Developmental psychology
- Language: English
- Edited by: David C. Witherington

Publication details
- Former name(s): Vita Humana
- History: 1958–present
- Publisher: Karger Publishers (Switzerland)
- Frequency: Bimonthly
- Open access: Hybrid
- Impact factor: 4.4 (2023)

Standard abbreviations
- ISO 4: Hum Dev

Indexing
- CODEN: HUDEA8
- ISSN: 0018-716X (print); 1423-0054 (web)
- LCCN: 60045764
- OCLC no.: 637575117

Links
- Journal homepage; Online access

Human Development is a bimonthly peer-reviewed scientific journal published by Karger Publishers. Established in 1958 as Vita Humana by Hans Thomae, the journal was published under the name Human Development from 1965.

== Scope ==
Human Development covers all aspects of human development, particularly developmental psychology. Its scope includes disparate disciplines such as anthropology, biology, education, psychology, and sociology, among others. Human Development publishes theoretical and metatheoretical contributions and integrative reviews of lines of research in psychological development within conceptual, historical, and methodological frameworks. Contributions serve to raise theoretical issues, flesh out interesting and potentially powerful ideas, and differentiate key constructs. Contributions come primarily from developmental psychology but are welcome from other relevant disciplines.

== Abstracting and indexing ==
The journal is indexed in, but not limited to,:

- Scopus
- Web of Science

== Editors-in-Chief ==
Founder: Hans Thomae (1958–1981)

Successors:

- CM.L. Langeveld (1963–1974)
- Bernice L. Neugarten (1963–1969)
- Klaus F. Riegel (1970–1977)
- John A. Meacham (1977–1987)
- Wolfgang Edelstein (1982–1987)
- Hermine Sinclair (1982–1987)
- Deanna Kuhn (1988–1996)
- Barbara Rogoff (1997–2002)
- Geoffrey B. Saxe (2003–2006)
- Larry Nucci (2007–2019)
- Susan Rivera (2019–2023)
- David C. Witherington (2023-present)

== Affiliated Society ==
The journal is the official journal of the Jean Piaget Society.
