= Robert L. Flood =

British organizational scientist

Robert Louis (Bob) Flood (born 1955) is a British organizational scientist, former Professor of Management Sciences at the University of Hull, specialized in applied systemic thinking, particularly in the areas of strategic management, organizational behavior and organizational improvement.

== Biography ==
Born in London in February 1955, Robert Flood received a first class B.A. in Systems and Management in 1983 at City University and his PhD in Philosophy in Systems Science at City University in 1985. In 1997, he was awarded a Doctor of Science from the University of Hull for his sustained and authoritative contribution to the field of systems science.

Prior to university Flood worked several years in the film business in the management of Paramount Pictures, in the health service for the Berkshire Area Health Authority, and at National Opinion Polls in London. In 1989 he was appointed Professor of Systems Science at the University of Hull, and currently is a Professor of Action Research at the Norwegian University of Science and Technology in Trondheim. Flood has practiced as an independent action researcher since 1997, having left Hull under a cloud following questions regarding management style, use of departmental funds and plagiarism.

Flood is founding and current editor of the international journal "Systemic Practice and Action Research" and is also associate editor of the "Systems Research and Behavioral Science" journal. He also has been a Fellow of the Institute of Measurement and Control and was a registered Chartered Engineer.

Flood was a nominee for the 'MCA (Management Consultants Association) 1993 Management Book of the Year Award' for Beyond TQM.

== Publications ==
Flood has authored and co-authored a dozen books and more than 100 articles. A selection:

- Flood, Robert L., and Ewart Carson. Dealing with complexity: an introduction to the theory and application of systems science. Springer Science & Business Media, 1988, 1993.
- Flood, Robert L., and Michael C. Jackson. Creative problem solving: Total systems intervention. Chichester: Wiley, 1991.
- Flood, Robert L., and Michael C. Jackson. Critical systems thinking: Directed readings. Chichester: Wiley, 1991.
- Flood, Robert L. Beyond TQM. Chichester: Wiley, 1993.
- Flood, Robert L., and Romm N. R. A. Diversity management: Triple loop learning. Chichester: Wiley, 1996.
- Flood, Robert L., and Romm N. R. A. Critical systems thinking: Current research and practice. Plenum: New York, 1996.
- Flood, Robert L. Rethinking the fifth discipline: Learning within the unknowable. Routledge, 1999; 2002.

More recent well-cited articles include:

- Flood, Robert L. 2010. The Relationship of systems thinking to action research. Systemic Practice and Action Research 23: 269-284.
- Flood, Robert L., and Norma RA Romm. 2018. A systemic approach to processes of power in learning organisations. Part 1: Literature, theory, and methodology of triple loop learning. The Learning Organisation 25: 1-14.
