= Jean Piaget Society =

Society for developmental psychology

The Jean Piaget Society is an international learned society dedicated to studying human knowledge from a developmental perspective. It is named after the highly regarded developmental psychologist Jean Piaget. Since 1989, its full name has been the Jean Piaget Society: Society for the Study of Knowledge and Development.

== Overview ==
It was established in 1970 by Temple University professor Lois Macomber in Philadelphia, Pennsylvania. The Society is based in Media, Pennsylvania, and its current president is David Witherington. It sponsors a book series, an annual meeting, and the peer-reviewed journal Human Development, which is the Society's official journal. The book series, entitled the "Jean Piaget Symposium Series", is based on the Society's annual meetings. It was published by Lawrence Erlbaum Associates for over thirty years.

== Annual conferences ==
The occasion of their 50th anniversary provided a timely opportunity to both celebrate the birth and history of the Jean Piaget Society and critically examine Piaget’s enduring contributions to contemporary developmental scholarship and practice. The 2021 conference focused on constructivism, a foundational tenet of Piaget’s theory and the School of Geneva.

The program explored science and culture as active, transformative, and historical processes and practices, with deep and far-reaching implications for understanding human development and knowledge. Discussion included how processes and practices of science might be woven into what is considered to be truth and knowledge, and what is valued with respect to how human development is studied and to what effect; those of culture—from daily routines to institutionalized practices (e.g., in education)—become tools with which developing individuals construct realities, knowledge, and value commensurate with personal and relational histories.

An interdisciplinary cast of invited speakers provided an overview of different constructivist approaches (including Vygotsky’s); addressed the relevance of constructivism to the burgeoning fields of epigenetics and neurodevelopment, with special reference to the longstanding nature-nurture controversy; critiqued the ongoing dialogue about constructivist education and policy; and explored implications of constructivism for understanding developmental diversities. The history of the Jean Piaget Society was showcased in a variety of displays and special sessions during the first day of the virtual meeting.
