= Werner Ulrich =

Swiss systems scientist

Werner Ulrich (born 1948) is a Swiss social scientist and practical philosopher, and a former professor of the theory and practice of social planning at the University of Fribourg. He is known as one of the originators of critical systems thinking (CST) and in particular for the development of critical systems heuristics.

== Life and work ==
Ulrich was born in 1948 in Bern, Switzerland, He received doctoral degrees in Economics and Social Sciences from the University of Fribourg in 1975, and a Ph.D. in Philosophy of Social Systems Design from the University of California at Berkeley in 1980, where he studied and worked with C. West Churchman.

Back in Switzerland, in 1981, Ulrich started a double career as policy analyst in government at the canton of Bern, and academic teacher at the University of Fribourg. Here he was appointed Titular Professor of Social Planning in the Faculty of Arts. He has also been Visiting Professor at the University of Hull, the University of Lincoln, the University of Canterbury in Christchurch, New Zealand, and the Open University in Milton Keynes, UK. Ulrich is now retired from his professorship at the University of Fribourg but remains Honorary Visiting Professor at the Open University.

In 2001, he initiated the Lugano Summer School of Systems Design at the University of Lugano, which he has been directing since.

Ulrich is co-founder and coeditor of the "Journal of Research Practice".

== Publications ==
Ulrich wrote a few books and some 175 articles. A selection:

- 1975. Kreativitätsförderung in der Unternehmung: Ansatzpunkte eines Gesamtkonzepts.
- 1983. Critical heuristics of social planning: a new approach to practical philosophy. Habilitation thesis. Bern: Haupt.
- 1994. Critical heuristics of social planning: a new approach to practical philosophy. New York: Wiley.

Articles, a selection:

- 1998. "Systems Thinking as if People Mattered: Critical Systems Thinking for Citizens and Managers". Working Paper No. 23 1998
- 2000. Reflective Practice in the Civil Society: The Contribution of Critically Systemic Thinking"
- 2004. "In memory of C. West Churchman (1913–2004): Reminiscences, retrospectives, and reflections". In: Journal of Organisational Transformation and Social Change Vol 1 Numbers 2–3.
- 2005. "A Brief Introduction to Critical Systems Heuristics (CSH)".
