= Model-dependent realism =

View of scientific inquiry that focuses on the role of scientific models of phenomena

Model-dependent realism is a view of scientific inquiry that focuses on the role of scientific models of phenomena. It claims reality should be interpreted based upon these models, and where several models overlap in describing a particular subject, multiple, equally valid, realities exist. It claims that it is meaningless to talk about the "true reality" of a model as we can never be absolutely certain of anything. The only meaningful thing is the usefulness of the model. The term "model-dependent realism" was coined by Stephen Hawking and Leonard Mlodinow in their 2010 book The Grand Design.

== Overview ==
Model-dependent realism asserts that all we can know about "reality" consists of networks of world pictures that explain observations by connecting them by rules to concepts defined in models. Will an ultimate theory of everything be found? Hawking and Mlodinow suggest it is unclear:

In the history of science we have discovered a sequence of better and better theories or models, from Plato to the classical theory of Newton to modern quantum theories. It is natural to ask: Will this sequence eventually reach an end point, an ultimate theory of the universe, that will include all forces and predict every observation we can make, or will we continue forever finding better theories, but never one that cannot be improved upon? We do not yet have a definitive answer to this question...

— Stephen Hawking & Leonard Mlodinow, The Grand Design, p. 8

A world picture consists of the combination of a set of observations accompanied by a conceptual model and by rules connecting the model concepts to the observations. Different world pictures that describe particular data equally well all have equal claims to be valid. There is no requirement that a world picture be unique, or even that the data selected include all available observations. The universe of all observations at present is covered by a network of overlapping world pictures and, where overlap occurs; multiple, equally valid, world pictures exist. At present, science requires multiple models to encompass existing observations:

Like the overlapping maps in a Mercator projection, where the ranges of different versions overlap, they predict the same phenomena. But just as there is no flat map that is a good representation of the earth's entire surface, there is no single theory that is a good representation of observations in all situations

— Stephen Hawking & Leonard Mlodinow, The Grand Design, p. 9

Where several models are found for the same phenomena, no single model is preferable to the others within that domain of overlap.

== Model selection ==
While not rejecting the idea of "reality-as-it-is-in-itself", model-dependent realism suggests that we cannot know "reality-as-it-is-in-itself", but only an approximation of it provided by the intermediary of models. The view of models in model-dependent realism also is related to the instrumentalist approach to modern science, that a concept or theory should be evaluated by how effectively it explains and predicts phenomena, as opposed to how accurately it describes objective reality (a matter possibly impossible to establish). A model is a good model if it:

1. Is elegant
2. Contains few arbitrary or adjustable elements
3. Agrees with and explains all existing observations
4. Makes detailed predictions about future observations that can disprove or falsify the model if they are not borne out.

"If the modifications needed to accommodate new observations become too baroque, it signals the need for a new model." Of course, an assessment like that is subjective, as are the other criteria. According to Hawking and Mlodinow, even very successful models in use today do not satisfy all these criteria, which are aspirational in nature.

== See also ==
- All models are wrong
- Commensurability
- Conceptualist realism
- Constructivist epistemology
- Fallibilism
- Internal realism
- Instrumentalism
- Models of scientific inquiry
- Ontological pluralism
- Philosophical realism
- Pragmatism
- Scientific perspectivism
- Scientific realism
- Space mapping
