= World Hypotheses =

Book by Stephen C. Pepper

World Hypotheses: A Study in Evidence, by Stephen C. Pepper (1942), presents four relatively adequate world hypotheses (or world views or conceptual systems) in terms of their root metaphors: formism (similarity), mechanism (machine), contextualism (historical act), and organicism (living system).

In World Hypotheses, Pepper argues that logical positivism was in error, because there is no such thing as data free from interpretation, and that root metaphors are necessary in epistemology. In other words, objectivity is a myth because there is no such thing as pure, objective fact. Consequently, an analysis is necessary to understand how to interpret these 'facts.' Pepper does so by developing the "[root metaphor method, ...] and outlines what he considers to be four basically adequate world hypotheses (world views or conceptual systems): formism, mechanism, contextualism, and organicism." He identifies the strengths and weaknesses of each of the world hypotheses as well as the paradoxical and sometimes mystifying effects of the effort to synthesize them.

== Dogmatism ==
Pepper begins by demonstrating the very weak positions of utter skepticism and dogmatism while explaining that each are essentially two sides of the same coin. He has no problem with relative skepticism, where one suspends belief until justification is provided. But utter skepticism is essentially a dogmatist who doubts all things, always. Pepper defines a dogmatist "as one whose belief exceeds his cognitive grounds for belief." If neither position of utter skepticism and dogmatism are cognitively justifiable, then knowledge about the world will be somewhere in between. Specifically, between common sense and refined knowledge.

== Evidence ==
There is a tension between common sense and refined knowledge. Common sense is ubiquitous and ever present, and therefore gives a strong sense of certainty. But once you reflect upon common sense, it is no longer common sense and has moved into the realm of refined knowledge. To a large extent, the philosophy of science, and science in general, is interested in this shift.

Once you embark into refined knowledge, there are certain criteria as to what constitutes 'evidence.' In other words, there are rules governing how we know what we know (This should be recognized as an epistemological concept). And depending on the choice of your root metaphor, different criteria exist as to what constitutes good evidence.

Pepper presents two types of world hypotheses: inadequate and relatively adequate hypotheses. The two inadequate systems are identified as mysticism and animism.

== Relatively adequate hypotheses ==
=== Formism (similarity) ===
Why does an orange look and taste like an orange? It's in the nature of an orange to be orange in color and round in shape and to taste like an orange. These are an orange's distinguishing properties, attributes, traits, or features—in short, its essence. The root metaphor for formism is identification of similarities and differences for phenomena. In short, things that appear to go together do in fact go together. Plato and Aristotle are examples of formist philosophers.

=== Mechanism (machine) ===
Given 19th and 20th century technologies—steam engines, gas engines, electric motors, and computers—the machine is frequently adopted as a metaphor for understanding phenomena. Machines are described according to the parts from which they are assembled—for example, gears, wires, or chips. Machines remain at rest until energy is supplied from outside. The root metaphor of mechanism (philosophy) is identification of the parts and processes and their response to stimulation from the environment. Mechanistic philosophers include Descartes, Thomas Hobbes, John Locke, and David Hume.

=== Contextualism (historical act) ===
Historical events—an election, revolution, or war—have no significance when considered in isolation. The significance of an historical act depends on its context: its relationship with events that precede and follow and the interpretations of these acts. The historical-context, or contextualist, metaphor, is selection among events, contexts, and interpretations and weaving these into coherent and meaningful histories. Charles Sanders Peirce, William James, Henri Bergson, and John Dewey are examples of contextualist philosophers.

=== Organicism (living system) ===
We are immersed in a biological world of living organisms, both plants and animals, including ourselves. Living organisms are organized, self-regulating, and actively functioning systems. A seed planted in favorable conditions, unfolding and maturing into a tree, is an example of an organismic system. The root metaphor for organicism is inquiring how living systems maintain adaptive balances between acting on the environment and being acted on and supported by the environment. Organismic philosophers include Friedrich Wilhelm Joseph Schelling and Georg Wilhelm Friedrich Hegel.

== Jargon ==
- dubitanda: Pepper's jargon for common sense.
- data: Pepper's jargon for multiplicative corroboration, which simply refers to repeated empirical observation. If two people read a thermometer and agree on the reading, there has been multiplicative corroboration. In layman's terms, we call this data.
- danda: Pepper's jargon for structural corroboration, which in layman's terms is similar to logical data.

== Publications ==
=== Core publications ===
- Berry, Franklin M. (1984). An introduction to Stephen C. Pepper's philosophical system via World Hypotheses: A Study in Evidence. Bulletin of the Psychonomic Society, 22(5), 446-448.
- Hayes, Steven C., Hayes, L. J., & Reese, H W. (1988). Finding the philosophical core: A review of Stephen C. Pepper's World Hypotheses: A study in evidence. Journal of the Experimental Analysis of Behavior, 50, 97-111.
- Pepper, S. C. (1942). World hypotheses: A study in evidence. Berkeley, CA: University of California Press.

=== Extensions and applications ===
- Efron, A. (Ed.). (1982). The Pepper papers, a symposium on the meta-philosophy of Stephen C. Pepper: Root metaphor theory (Special issue). Journal of Mind and Behavior, 3(3 & 4).
- Efron, A. (1980). Pepper's continuing value: In A. Efron & J. Herold (Eds.), Root metaphor: The live thought of Stephen C. Pepper. Paunch, No. 53-54, 5-53.
- Harris, Maxine, Fontana, A. F., & Downs, B. N. (1977). The World Hypotheses Scale: Rationale, reliability and validity. Journal of Personality Assessment, 41(5), 537-547.
- Meacham, J. A. (2004). Action, voice, and identity in children's lives. In P. B. Pufall and R. P. Unsworth (Eds.), Rethinking childhood. Piscataway, NJ: Rutgers University Press. Pp. 69-84.
- Meacham, J. A. (2015). Metaphors for understanding children and their role in culture. In Guner Coskunsu (Ed.), The archaeological study of childhood: Interdisciplinary perspectives on an archaeological enigma. Albany: SUNY Press. Pp. 149-164.
- Morris, E. K. (1988). Contextualism: The world view of behavior analysis. Journal of Experimental Child Psychology, 46, 289-323.
- Overton, W. F., & Reese, H. W. (1973). Models of development: Methodological implications. In J. R. Nesselroade & H. W. Reese (Eds.), Life-span developmental psychology: Methodological issues (pp. 65-86). New York: Academic Press.
- Peterson, C. Four ways to explain anything . . . but not everything to everyone.
- Reese, H. W., & Overton, W. F. (1970). Models of development and theories of development. In L. R. Goulet and P. B. Baltes (Eds.), Life-span developmental psychology: Research and theory (pp. 115-145). New York: Academic Press.
