= Boundary critique =

Boundary critique (BC) is the concept in critical systems thinking that, according to Ulrich (2002), states that "both the meaning and the validity of professional propositions always depend on boundary judgments as to what 'facts' (observation) and 'norms' (valuation standards) are to be considered relevant" or not.

Boundary critique is based on Churchman's (1970) argument, "that what is to be included or excluded for any analysis of a situation is a vital consideration". According to Kagan et al. (2004) "Something that appears to be relevant to overall project improvement given a narrowly defined boundary, may not be seen as relevant at all if the boundaries are pushed out. Thus, he argues, as much information as possible should be 'swept in' to the definition of the intervention".

This argumentation was extended by Werner Ulrich in the 1980s. According to Kagan et al. (2004) he "offered a detailed challenge to the idea that the boundaries of any system are given and linked to "social reality". They are social or personal constructs that define the limits of knowledge relevant to any particular analysis. From this position, pushing out the boundaries of an analysis, in the context of human systems, also involves pushing the boundaries of who may be considered a decision maker".

In the practice of boundary critique, according to Ulrich (2000) different kind of boundaries can be set based on different questions:

- Self-reflective boundary relating to the question "What are my boundary judgements?".
- Dialogical boundary relating to the question "Can we agree on our boundary judgements?".
- Controversial boundary relating to the question "Don't you claim too much?".
