= CIA cryptonym =

List of code names

CIA cryptonyms are code names or code words used by the U.S. Central Intelligence Agency (CIA) to refer to projects, operations, persons, agencies, etc.

== Format of cryptonyms ==
CIA cryptonyms sometimes contain a two character prefix called a digraph, which designates a geographical or functional area. Certain digraphs were changed over time; for example, the digraph for the Soviet Union changed at least twice.

The rest is either an arbitrary dictionary word, or occasionally the digraph and the cryptonym combine to form a dictionary word (e.g., AEROPLANE) or can be read out as a simple phrase (e.g., WIBOTHER, read as "Why bother!"). Cryptonyms are sometimes written with a slash after the digraph, e.g., ZR/RIFLE, and sometimes in one sequence, e.g., ZRRIFLE. The latter format is the more common style in CIA documents.

Examples from publications by former CIA personnel show that the terms "code name" and "cryptonym" can refer to the names of operations as well as to individual persons. TRIGON, for example, was the code name for Aleksandr Ogorodnik, a member of the Ministry of Foreign Affairs in the former Soviet Union, whom the CIA developed as a spy; HERO was the code name for Col. Oleg Penkovsky, who supplied data on the nuclear readiness of the Soviet Union during the Cuban Missile Crisis of 1962. According to former CIA Director Richard M. Helms: "The code names for most Agency operations are picked in sequence from a sterile list, with care taken not to use any word that might give a clue to the activity it covers. On some large projects, code names are occasionally specially chosen—GOLD, SILVER, PBSUCCESS, CORONA. When Robert F. Kennedy requested a code name for the government-wide plan that Richard Goodwin was drafting, an exception was made. Goodwin was on the White House staff, and the plan concerned Cuba. Occasionally the special code names come close to the nerve, as did MONGOOSE." A secret joint program between the Mexico City CIA station and the Mexican secret police to wiretap the Soviet and Cuban embassies was code-named ENVOY.

Some cryptonyms relate to more than one subject, e.g., a group of people. In this case, the basic cryptonym, e.g., LICOZY, will designate the whole group, while each group member is designated by a sequence number, e.g., LICOZY/3, which can also be written LICOZY-3, or just L-3.

== Digraphs ==
=== Partial list of digraphs and probable definitions ===
- AE: Soviet Union (1960s)
- AL: Brazil
- AM: Cuba (also JM)
- AV: Uruguay
- BE: Poland
- BG: Albania
- BF: Thailand BF20The Android Industrial Revolution And the study of AI agent systems.
- BI: Argentina
- CA: West Germany
- CK: CIA Soviet and East Europe division sensitive cases (late 1970s)
- DB: Iraq
- DI: Czechoslovakia
- DM: SFRY / Yugoslavia
- DN: South Korea
- DU: Peru
- EC: Ecuador
- ES: Guatemala (also PB)
- FU: Chile
- GT: CIA Soviet and East Europe division sensitive cases (1980s)
- HA: Indonesia (1958)
- IA: Angola
- IR: Philippines?
- JM: Cuba (also AM)
- KK: Israel
- KU: CIA and CIA components
- LC: China
- LN: United States
- LI: Mexico City
- MH: Worldwide operation.
- MJ: Palestinian-related
- MK: CIA Technical Services Division (1950s/1960s)
- ZR: Thailand
- OD: Other US Government Departments (1960s)
- PB: Guatemala (also ES)
- PD: Soviet Union (1980s)
- PO: Japan
- SD: Iran
- SM: United Kingdom
- ST: CIA Directorate of Operations, Far East division, China Branch
- SZ: Switzerland
- TP: Iran (1953)
- TU: South Vietnam
- WI: Congo-Léopoldville/Kinshasa (1960s)
- EU-RN: Intelligence intercept program of CIA Staff D ops, the group that worked directly with the NSA (National Security Agency).

=== Unidentified digraphs ===
DT, ER, FJ, HB, HO, HT, JU, KM, KO, QK, SC, SE, SG, WO, WS, ZI

== Known cryptonyms ==
- ADAM: Guatemala City
- AEACRE: Ukrainian Supreme Liberation Council (ZP/UHVR) radio broadcasts
- AECASSOWARY-2: Mykola Lebed, President of Prolog and CIA Principal Agent
- AECROAK: Radio station called Nasha Rossiya
- AEFOXTROT: Yuri Ivanovich Nosenko, a Soviet defector.
- AELADLE: Anatoliy Golitsyn, Soviet defector and former KGB officer.
- AERODYNAMIC: Psychological warfare operation
- AERANTER: Sub-project of Operation AERODYNAMIC
- AESCREEN: Soviet Bloc division's translation and analysis unit
- AETENURE: Prolog Research and Publishing Association, Inc.
- AMBIDDY-1: Manuel Artime.
- AMBLOOD: Luis Torroella y Martin Rivero, a CIA agent.
- AMCLATTER-1: Bernard Barker, one of the Watergate burglars.
- AMBUD
- AMCLEOPATRA
- AMCOBRA
- AMCOG-3: Ramón Grau San Martín
- AMCROW
- AMCRUZ or AMCRUX?
- AMFOX
- AMGLOSSY
- AMHALF
- AMJUDGE
- AMLASH: Plan to assassinate Fidel Castro associated mainly with Rolando Cubela. AMLASH has been referred to as a "basically one-person Cubela operation".
- AMLASH-1: Rolando Cubela Secades, a Cuban official involved in plot to kill Fidel Castro in 1963.
- AMOT: Cuban exile informants of David Sánchez Morales.
- AMPALM-4
- AMQUACK: Che Guevara, Argentinian (later Cuban) guerrilla leader.
- AMTHUG: Fidel Castro, Prime Minister of Cuba 1959–1976.
- AMTRUNK: A CIA plan by New York Times journalist Tad Szulc initiated in February 1963, also called the "Leonardo Plan", that was "an attempt to find disgruntled military officials in Cuba who might be willing to recruit higher military officials in a plot to overthrow Castro", as well as to overthrow the Cuban government "by means of a conspiracy among high-level ... leaders of the government culminating in a coup d'etat". AMTRUNK has also been described as a "CIA-DIA Task Force on Cuba", and as "a plodding bureaucratic effort" that "had worked for months to identify Cuban leaders who might be able to stage a coup".
- AMWHIP-1: Business associate of Santo Trafficante Jr. who was in contact with Rolando Cubela (AMLASH) in 1963.
- AMWORLD: A plan initiated June 28, 1963, to overthrow the Castro regime in a coup on December 1, 1963 (C-Day), that would have installed Juan Almeida Bosque, a top ranking Cuban military officer, as the new head of state. Some Cuban exiles referred to C-Day as "Plan Omega".
- AMUPAS-1: June Cobb during her infiltration of the Cuban government under Fidel Castro.Cobb's aliases included "Clarinda E. Sharpe" and "Joyce Pineinch." From September 21 to 29, the CIA maintained surveillance of Cobb's hotel room in New York City. Cobb appears under the crytonym LICOOKY-1, which see, as she continued her CIA employment in Mexico and Gutelmala.
- BGGYPSY: Russia; Russian; Communist
- BOND: Puerto Barrios
- Caesar: Quetzaltenango
- CALLIGERIS: Carlos Castillo Armas
- CARTEL: Ukrainian Supreme Liberation Council (ZP/UHVR) radio broadcasts
- CKGULL: CIA Polish agent Ryszard Kukliński (also QTGULL)
- CKSPHERE, CKVANQUISH: Adolf Tolkachev
- CKTRIGON: Aleksandr Dmitrievich Ogorodnik
- CKTWINE: Boris Yuzhin
- CKUTOPIA, CKQUARTZ: Victor Sheymov
- CORONA: the CIA's first satellite Reconnaissance program, 1958
- DBACHILLES: 1995 effort to support a military coup in Iraq.
- DBANABASIS commenced Fall 2002, operation to train Iraqis in Area 51 in Nevada and then to run them on missions of sabotage and assassination inside Iraq.
- DBROCKSTARS: Iraqi spy ring recruited by the CIA shortly before the 2003 invasion of Iraq.
- Doc: Mazatenango
- DTFROGS: El Salvador
- DYCLAIM: Central Intelligence Agency (CIA)
- Eddie: El Quiché
- ESCOBILLA, Guatemalan national
- ESMERALDITE, labor informant affiliated with AFL-sponsored labor movement
- ESSENCE, Guatemalan anti-Communist leader
- FJHOPEFUL, military base
- Frank: Jutiapa, Guatemala
- Goss: Cobán, Guatemala
- GROSSBAHN: Otto von Bolschwing, Sicherheitsdienst officer who later served as a spy for CIA
- GTACCORD: GRU colonel Vladimir Mikhailovich Vasilyev
- GTCOWL: KGB officer Sergei Vorontsov ("Stas")
- GTFITNESS: KGB Gennady Varenik
- GTGAUZE: KGB major Sergey Motorin
- GTGENTILE: KGB lieutenant colonel Valery F. Martynov
- GTTICKLE: Oleg Gordievsky
- GTJOGGER: KGB lieutenant colonel Vladimir M. Piguzov
- GTMILLION: GRU lieutenant colonel Gennady Smetanin
- GTWEIGH: KGB officer Leonid Polyshuk
- Hank, Zacapa (Guatemalan base)
- HTAUTOMAT: Photointerpretation center for the Lockheed U-2 reconnaissance aircraft project.
- HTKEEPER: Mexico City
- HTLINGUAL or HGLINGUAL: Mail interception operation 1952–1973.
- HTNEIGH: National Committee for Free Albania (NCFA) [1949-mid1950s]
- HTPLUME: Panama
- Ike: San José
- Jack, Florida, Honduras
- JMADD: CIA air base near city of Retalhuleu, Guatemala 1960–1961
- JMATE: Cover Action plans against Cuba 1960–1961, resulting in Bay of Pigs invasion
- JMBELL: CIA office (location unknown) 1961
- JMBLUG: John Peurifoy, U.S. Ambassador to Guatemala.
- JMFURY: Preparatory strikes against Cuban airfields before Bay of Pigs Invasion 1961
- JMGLOW: CIA Washington 1961
- JMMOVE: CIA training base located in Belle Chasse, Louisiana 1961. The stated objective of the base was training Cuban refugees for the Bay of Pigs Invasion.
- JMTIDE: CIA air base in Puerto Cabezas, Nicaragua 1961
- JMTRAX: CIA covert air base/training camp in Guatemala 1960–1961
- JMWAVE: CIA station in Miami (that operated against Cuba).
- JMZIP: CIA office (location unknown) 1961
- Kent: Carias Viejas, Honduras
- KKMOUNTAIN: CIA-Mossad cooperation in the 1960s
- KMFLUSH: Nicaragua
- KMPAJAMA: Mexico
- KMPLEBE: Peru
- KUBARK: Central Intelligence Agency (CIA); CIA Headquarters, Langley
- KUBASS: CIA Directorate of Science and Technology (DS&T)
- KUCAGE: CIA Psychological and Paramilitary Operations Staff
- KUCHAP: CIA Deputy Director for Intelligence (DDI)
- KUCITY: CIA Technical Services Division
- KUCLUB: CIA Office of Communications
- KUDESK: CIA Counterintelligence Center
- KUDOVE: CIA Deputy Director for Operations (DDO)
- KUFIRE: CIA Foreign Intelligence Staff
- KUGOWN: CIA Psychological and Paramilitary Operations Staff
- KUHOOK: CIA Paramilitary Operations Staff
- KUJAZZ: CIA Office of National Estimates
- KUJUMP: CIA Contact Division
- KUKNOB: CIA Office of Scientific Intelligence (OSI)
- KUMONK: CIA Office of Political Analysis (OPA)
- KUPALM: CIA Office of Central Reference
- KURIOT: CIA Technical Services Division
- KUSODA: Center for CIA Security
- KUTUBE: CIA Foreign Intelligence Staff
- KUTWIN: Office of Strategic Services (OSS)
- KUWOLF: CIA Political and Psychological Staff
- KUWRAP: CIA Counterintelligence Center
- Larry: Entre Ríos, Guatemala
- LCFLUTTER: Polygraph, sometimes supplanted by truth drugs: Sodium Amytal (amobarbital), Sodium Pentothal (thiopental), and Seconal (secobarbital) to induce regression in the subject.
- LCPANGS: Costa Rica
- LNHARP: United States Government
- LICHANT-1, Manuel Calvillo, an official in Mexico's Secretaría de Gobernación was involved with the CIA's response to the assassination of JFK in Mexico City. He knew June Cobb was a CIA agent and was familiar with Elena Garro's knowledge of Lee Oswald. He allegedly hid Elena Garro and her daughter for eight days on the pretext of their saefty.
- LICOOKY-1, LICOOKIE-1: June Cobb, an American spy from Ponca City, Oklahoma; author; former aide to Fidel Castro; and Mexico City resident who rented a room to a witness of Lee Oswald in Mexico. Cobb was famous for her antics with a cat owned by this tenant, Eunice Odio, who said Cobb broke her cat's legs because of the way Odio shared her revelations of Oswald in Mexico City. Cobb was tasked by the CIA with infiltrating leftist and Communist writers and publishers. Cobb's work included connection to Elena Garro de Paz and the cryptonym Tichborn. The cat incident was later reported as a confirmed rumor in her own CIA personnel file, along with her tendency to have promiscuous sexual relations. See also AMUPAS-1 her other crytonym.
- LIEMBRACE: Surveillance team for the CIA station in Mexico.
- LIENVOY: Joint CIA-Mexican Wiretap/intercept program in Mexico.
- LINC, LINCOLN: PBSUCCESS Headquarters in Florida
- LIONIZER: Guatemalan refugee group in Mexico
- LITENSOR: Codename of CIA informant Adolfo López Mateos, president of Mexico.
- LITEMPO: Spy network, operated between 1956 and 1969, to exchange information with Mexican top officers.
- LITEMPO-1 Emilio Bolaños, nephew of Gustavo Díaz-Ordaz Bolaños (Secretary of the Interior in the cabinet of president Adolfo López Mateos)
- LITEMPO-2: Gustavo Díaz-Ordaz Bolaños, Secretary of the Interior in the cabinet of president Adolfo López Mateos and President of Mexico 1964–1970.
- LITEMPO-4: Fernando Gutiérrez Barrios, Head of the Dirección Federal de Seguridad (DFS), the top Mexican intelligence agency, at the midst of the dirty war (1964–1970).
- LITEMPO-8 (later LITEMPO-14): Luis Echeverría, Secretary of the Interior in the cabinet of president Gustavo Díaz-Ordaz Bolaños and President of Mexico 1970–1976.
- LITEMPO-12: Miguel Nazar Haro, a LITEMPO-4 subordinate, known to be in contact with CIA station chief Winston M. Scott; Nazar Haro later became head of the DFS intelligence agency (1978–1982)
- LILINK: Front company providing cover to CIA agents in Mexico City.
- LIOVAL-1: CIA agent, posing as English teacher in Mexico City.
- LICOWL-1: CIA agent, owner of a small business near the Soviet embassy in Mexico City.
- LICOZY-1, LICOZY-3 and LICOZY-5: Anti-KGB double agents in Mexico City.
- LICALLA: CIA surveillance posts for the Soviet embassy in Mexico City.
- LISAMPAN: Operation "bugging" the Cuban embassy in Mexico City.
- LICOBRA: Operation watching suspicious members of the ruling Mexican PRI party, the ministry of the exterior and other Mexican government officials.
- LIFIRE: Operation gathering intelligence from Mexican air travel and acquiring travel manifests from international flights.
- MHCHAOS: Surveillance of antiwar activists during the Vietnam War.
- Mike: Asunción Mita, Guatemala
- MJTRUST/2: Ali Hassan Salameh
- MKCHICKWIT: Identify new drug developments in Europe and Asia and obtain samples, part of MKSEARCH.
- MKDELTA: Operational arm of MKULTRA, subsequently became MKNAOMI.
- MKNAOMI: Stockpiling of lethal biological and chemical agents, successor to MKDELTA.
- MKOFTEN: Testing effects of biological and chemical agents, part of MKSEARCH.
- MKSEARCH: MKULTRA after 1964, mind control research.
- MKULTRA: covert funding mechanism for research and development of behavioral modification techniques. Renamed MKSEARCH in 1964.
- MPBLOTCH – CIA-developed trace metals detection test during the Vietnam War.
- Nick: Gualán, Guatemala
- ODACID: U.S. Embassy, United States Department of State/U.S. embassy
- ODEARL: United States Department of Defense
- ODENVY: Federal Bureau of Investigation
- ODEUM: Gehlen Organization (1950–1951)
- ODOATH: United States Navy
- ODOPAL: Counterintelligence Corps, United States Army
- ODUNIT: United States Air Force
- ODURGE: Immigration and Naturalization Service
- ODYOKE: Federal government of the United States
- OFFSPRING: Gehlen Organization (1949–1950)
- PANCHO: Carlos Castillo Armas
- PBFORTUNE: CIA project to supply forces opposed to Guatemala's President Arbenz with weapons, supplies, and funding; predecessor to PBSUCCESS.
- PBHISTORY: CIA project to gather and analyze documents from the Arbenz government in Guatemala that would incriminate Arbenz as a communist.
- PBJOINTLY: Operation that built a tunnel from the American sector of Berlin, to the Russian sector.
- PBCRUET: Psychological warfare radio broadcasts outside Ukraine
- PBPRIME: United States
- PBRUMEN: Cuba
- PBS, PBSUCCESS: Central Intelligence Agency covert operation to overthrow Arbenz government in Guatemala
- POCAPON: Taketora Ogata, Japanese politician in the 1950s.
- PODAM: Matsutarō Shōriki, Japanese businessman and politician.
- PYREX: Language units in WEMCA station
- QJWIN: European assassin. Also described as an "assassin recruiter".
- QKBROIL: Psychological warfare in Romania
- QKCIGAR: United States Government
- QKELUSION: West German Social Democratic Party (SPD)
- QKFLOWAGE: United States Information Agency
- QKENCHANT: CIA program associated with E. Howard Hunt (1918–2007), who with G. Gordon Liddy and others, was one of the White House's "plumbers"—a secret team of operatives charged with fixing "leaks".
- QKFLOWAGE: United States Information Agency
- QKHILLTOP: CIA program to study Chinese Communist brainwashing techniques and to develop interrogation techniques.
- QRDYNAMIC: A financial support program for Ukrainian-language publications to offset Soviet propaganda
- QRTENURE: Covert operation in New York City
- QTGULL: CIA Polish agent Ryszard Kukliński (also CKGULL)
- RANTER: Psychological warfare radio broadcasts from Greece
- RUFUS: Carlos Castillo Armas
- SARANAC: training site in Nicaragua
- SCRANTON: training base for radio operators near Nicaragua
- SD/PLOD/1: deputy prime minister for the Interim government of Iran Abbas Amir-Entezam
- SGUAT: CIA Station in Guatemala
- SHELLAC: Clandestine radio station in Romania, part of QKBROIL
- SHERWOOD: CIA radio broadcasting program based in Nicaragua begun on May 1, 1954
- SKILLET, Whiting Willauer, U.S. Ambassador to Honduras
- SKIMMER, The "Group" CIA cover organization supporting Castillo Armas
- SLINC, telegram indicator for PBSUCCESS Headquarters in Florida
- SRPOINTER or SGPOINTER: name for the mail intercept program from 1952 to 1955; later renamed HTLINGUAL.
- STANDEL: Jacobo Arbenz, President of Guatemala
- STORMY: LSD, Lysergic Acid Diethylamide, psychedelic drug experiments on public.
- SMOTH: UK Secret Intelligence Service (MI6)
- SYNCARP: the "Junta", Castillo Armas' political organization headed by Córdova Cerna
- Tichborn: Henry P. Lopez
- TPBEDAMN: U.S. operation to counter communist subversion in Iran with propaganda and bribes.
- TPAJAX: Overthrow of Mohammed Mossadeq, Prime Minister of Iran, in the 1953 Iranian coup orchestrated by a joint US/UK operation
- TPCREDO: Italy
- TPROACH: Yugoslavia
- TPTONIC: National Committee for Free Europe (NCFE)
- UNREST: Otto von Bolschwing
- UPTHRUST: Konrad Adenauer
- USAGE: Otto von Bolschwing
- UTILITY: Reinhard Gehlen, first president of the Bundesnachrichtendienst
- WASHTUB: Operation to plant Soviet arms in Nicaragua
- WEMCA: CIA communications station in Athens, Greece
- WOFIRM: Unidentified cryptonym mentioned in a dispatch which describes a request to release a document pertaining to the Warren Commission. It may have been the codename for Richard Helms or his department.
- WSBURNT: Guatemala
- WSHOOFS: Honduras
- ZIPPER: Gehlen Organization (1951–1956)
- ZRRIFLE: An assassination plot targeting Fidel Castro

== Operations and projects ==
- APPLE: Agent team seen in 1952 by CIA/OPC as best bet to successfully continue BGFIEND Project aimed to harass/overthrow Albanian communist regime. Team was arrested, communists controlled radio ops for 16 months, luring more agents into Albania in 1953, and trying and executing original agents in 1954 to suddenly end BGFIEND.
- ARTICHOKE: Researching methods of interrogation. Precursor to MKULTRA. Primary goal of Project Artichoke was to determine whether a person could be involuntarily made to perform an act of attempted assassination. The project also studied the effects of mind control and hypnosis, forced addiction to (and subsequent withdrawal from) morphine, and other chemicals, including LSD, to produce amnesia and other vulnerable states in victims.
- AZORIAN: Project to raise the Soviet submarine K-129 from the Pacific Ocean.
- BGGYPSY: Communist.
- BIRCH
- BLACKSHIELD: A-12 aircraft reconnaissance missions off Okinawa.
- BLUEBIRD: mind control program
- BOND: Puerto Barrios, Guatemala.
- CATIDE: Bundesnachrichtendienst.
- CHARITY: Joint CIA/OSO-Italian Naval Intelligence information gathering operation against Albania (1948–1951).
- CHERRY: Covert assassination / destabilization operation during Vietnam War, targeting Prince (later King) Norodom Sihanouk and the government of Cambodia. Disbanded.
- CKTAW: Wiretap operation in Moscow, Russia.
- DTFROGS: El Salvador.
- ESCOBILLA: Guatemalan national.
- ESMERALDITE: Labor informant affiliated with AFL-sponsored labor movement.
- ESQUIRE: James Bamford, author of The Puzzle Palace.
- ESSENCE: Guatemalan anti-communist leader.
- FDTRODPINT: Afghan tribal agents, formerly known as GESENIOR, reactivated in the 1990s by the CIA to hunt Mir Aimal Kasi and later Osama bin Laden.
- FIR
- FUBELT: operation against Salvador Allende in Chile.
- FJGROUND: Grafenwöhr, Germany paramilitary training ground.
- FJHOPEFUL: Military base.
- FPBERM: Yugoslavia
- GESENIOR: Afghan tribal agents working with the CIA during the Soviet–Afghan War. Later called FDTRODPINT.
- GPFLOOR: Lee Harvey Oswald.
- GPIDEAL: John F. Kennedy, US president.
- GRATTIC: Pyotr Popov, CIA Soviet agent.
- GUSTO: Project to design a follow-on to the Lockheed U-2 reconnaissance aircraft. Succeeded RAINBOW. Succeeded by OXCART.
- HBFAIRY: France
- HTCURIO: American or U.S. (Not Government)
- IAFEATURE: Operation to support the National Union for the Total Independence of Angola (UNITA) and the National Liberation Front of Angola (FNLA) during the Angolan civil war.
- IDIOM: Initial work by Convair on a follow-on to the Lockheed U-2 reconnaissance aircraft. Later moved into GUSTO.
- Project JBEDICT: Tripartite Stay-Behind project.
- JENNIFER: Document control system for Project AZORIAN.
- KEMPSTER: Project to reduce the radar cross section (RCS) of the inlets of the Lockheed A-12 reconnaissance aircraft.
- KMHYMNAL: Maine-built motor sailer JUANITA purchased by CIA to use as floating, clandestine, propaganda broadcast facility in Mediterranean/Adriatic (1950–53).
- LEMON
- LNWILT: US Counterintelligence Corps (CIC)
- LPMEDLEY: Surveillance of telegraphic information exiting or entering the United States.
- MAGPIE: US Army Labor Service Organization
- MATADOR: Project to recover section of Soviet submarine K-129 dropped during Project AZORIAN. Cancelled after Soviet protest.
- MK NAOMI: successor to the MKULTRA project focusing on biological projects including biological warfare agents — specifically, to store materials that could either incapacitate or kill a test subject and to develop devices for the diffusion of such materials.
- MK ULTRA: a human experimentation program to develop procedures and identify drugs that could be used during interrogations to weaken individuals and force confessions through brainwashing and psychological torture. Successor to ARTICHOKE; succeeded by MKNAOMI.
- MOCKINGBIRD: a wire tapping operation of two journalists in 1963 to determine the source of leaked information
- MONGOOSE: "Primarily a relentless and escalating campaign of sabotage and small Cuban exile raids that would somehow cause the overthrow of Castro," which "also included plans for an invasion of Cuba in the fall of 1962".
- NAOMI: see MK NAOMI.
- OAK: Operation to assassinate suspected South Vietnamese collaborators during Vietnam War.
- PANCHO: Carlos Castillo Armas, President of Guatemala, also RUFUS.
- PAPERCLIP: US recruiting of German scientists after World War II.
- PHOENIX: Vietnam covert intelligence/assassination operation.
- PINE
- RAINBOW: Project to reduce the radar cross section (RCS) of the Lockheed U-2 reconnaissance aircraft. Succeeded by GUSTO.
- QKWAVER: Egypt
- RUFUS: Carlos Castillo Armas, President of Guatemala, also PANCHO.
- RYBAT: Secret.
- SARANAC: Training site in Nicaragua.
- SCRANTON: Training base for radio operators near Nicaragua.
- SGCIDER: Germany.
- SGUAT: CIA Station in Guatemala.
- SHERWOOD: CIA radio broadcast program in Nicaragua begun on May 1, 1954.
- SKILLET: Whiting Willauer, U.S. Ambassador to Honduras.
- SKIMMER: The "Group" CIA cover organization supporting Castillo Armas.
- SLINC: Telegram indicator for PBSUCCESS Headquarters in Florida.
- STANDEL: Jacobo Arbenz, President of Guatemala.
- STARGATE: Investigation of psychic phenomena.
- STBAILEY: political action and propaganda part of STBARNUM.
- STBARNUM: CIA Tibetan program (covert action in Tibet, 1950s onwards).
- STCIRCUS: aerial part of STBARNUM.
- STSPIN: Three P-3A Orion aircraft operated from Taiwan in 1966.
- SYNCARP: The "Junta", Castillo Armas' political organization headed by Cordova Cerna.
- THERMOS: Unclassified codeword used in lieu of RAINBOW.
- THROWOFF/2: Albanian ethnic agent/radio operator employed by Italian Navy Intelligence/CIA in several early Cold War covert operations against Albania. Was captured, operated radio under communist control to lure CIA agents to capture/death, tried in 1954, death sentence commuted, freed after 25 years. CIA paid his son $40,000 in 1996.
- OPERATION TILT: The CIA's name for "an operation put together by John Martino, who was fronting for his boss Santo Trafficante and his roommate Johnny Roselli". OPERATION TILT used "some of the same people working on the CIA-Mafia plots in the spring of 1963 ... [and] involved sending a Cuban exile team into Cuba to retrieve Soviet technicians supposedly ready to defect and reveal the existence of Soviet missiles still on the island".
- TROPIC: Air operations flown over North Korea, China, and the Soviet Union by CAT pilots during the 1950s.
- ULTRA: see MK ULTRA.
- VALUABLE: British MI-run Albanian operations 1949 to 1953.
- WASHTUB: Operation to plant Soviet arms in Nicaragua.
- WBFISHY: UK's Foreign and Commonwealth Office.
- WSBURNT: Guatemala.
- WSHOOFS: Honduras.
- ZAPATA: Bay of Pigs Invasion 1961.

== See also ==
- Secret Service codename
- List of U.S. government and military acronyms
- Callsign § Military call signs
- 00 Agent § Inspiration
- List of military operations

== Bibliography ==
- Agee, Philip. 1975. Inside the Company: CIA Diary. Stonehill Publishing ISBN 0-14-004007-2, p. 48
- Carl, Leo D. 1990. The International Dictionary of Intelligence. Mavin Books, p. 107
- Central Intelligence Agency (June 2007). Nazi War Crimes and Japanese Imperial Government Records Interagency Working Group (ed.). Research Aid: Cryptonyms and Terms in Declassified CIA Files (PDF) (Report). National Archives and Records Administration.
- DPD Contracting Officer, Change of Project Funds Obligated under Contract No. SS-100. CIA DPD-2827-59, 30 April 1959.
- Helms, Richard and Hood, William. 2003. A Look Over My Shoulder: A Life in the Central Intelligence Agency. Random House, pp. 378–379
- Pedlow, Gregory W. and Welzenbach, Donald E. 1992. The Central Intelligence Agency and Overhead Reconnaissance: The U-2 and OXCART Programs, 1954–1974. CIA History Staff.
- Sharp, David (2012). The CIA's Greatest Covert Operation: Inside the Daring Mission to Recover a Nuclear-Armed Soviet Sub. Lawrence, KS: University Press of Kansas. p. 344. ISBN 978-0-7006-1834-7. Archived from the original on 2012-07-28.
- Smith W. Thomas. 2003. Encyclopedia of the Central Intelligence Agency. Checkmark Books ISBN 0-8160-4666-2
- Stockwell, John. 1978. In Search of Enemies
- Waldron, Lamar and Hartmann, Thom. 2009. Legacy of Secrecy: The Long Shadow of the JFK Assassination. Counterpoint (LS)
- Waldron, Lamar and Hartmann, Thom. 2005. Ultimate Sacrifice: John and Robert Kennedy, the Plan for a Coup in Cuba, and the Murder of JFK Carroll & Graf Publishers (US)
- Wallace, Robert and H. Keith Melton. 2008. Spycraft: The Secret History of the CIA's Spytechs from Communism to Al-Qaeda. Dutton.
- Weiner, Tim. 2008. Legacy of Ashes: The History of the CIA. Anchor Books.
- Wise, David. 1992. Molehunt. Random House, p. 19.
