= Louis Schalk =

American aviator and test pilot (1926-2002)

- Born: 29 May 1926; Alden, Iowa, U.S.
- Died: 16 August 2002 (aged 76); Arlington, Virginia, U.S.
- Burial place: West Point, New York, U.S.
- Military career
- Allegiance: United States of America
- Branch: United States Air Force
- Service years: 1944–1957
- Rank: Captain
- Nickname: "Lou"
- Units: 86th Fighter-Bomber Wing; Edwards AFB Fighter Operations
- Conflicts: Cold War
- Other work: Test pilot

Louis Wellington 'Lou' Schalk, Jr (29 May 1926 – 16 August 2002) was an American aviator. As chief test pilot for the Lockheed Corporation's Skunk Works, he was first to fly the Lockheed A-12.

A native of Alden, Iowa, Schalk started at West Point in 1944, graduated in 1948, then trained and received his pilot's wings at Nellis Air Force Base. He served with the 86th Fighter-Bomber Wing in Germany. Schalk completed flight instructor school at Craig AFB and taught at Laredo Air Force Base in Texas.

Schalk graduated first in his class at the Experimental Test Pilot School at Edwards Air Force Base (EAFB) in 1954, becoming an Air Force test pilot assigned to Fighter Operations, testing such aircraft as the F-100, F-101, and F-104, under the command of Pete Everest and Chuck Yeager.

He joined Lockheed in 1957, and in 1959 was chosen by Kelly Johnson as chief test pilot for the Skunk Works.

As such, he assisted in the design of the cockpit of the A-12 as well as conducting the unofficial and official first flights of the aircraft and contributing to the resolution of initial instability issues. In his role as chief test pilot Schalk interfaced extensively and significantly with systems engineers for the A-12, YF-12, and SR-71, conducting the first thirteen flights of the A-12, the first four flights in excess of Mach 3.0, reaching a top speed of Mach 3.287, and conducting subsequent engineering test flights above Mach 3.0 as engine, inlet, afterburner and other critical systems were evaluated and fine-tuned, with altitudes in excess of 90,000 feet.

Schalk was buried in West Point Cemetery on the grounds of the U.S. Military Academy in West Point, New York.
