= Blip-to-scan ratio =

Parameter in radar systems

In radar systems, the blip-to-scan ratio, or blip/scan, is the ratio of the number of times a target appears on a radar display to the number of times it theoretically could be displayed. Alternately it can be defined as the ratio of the number of scans in which an accurate return is received to the total number of scans.

"Blip" refers to the dots drawn on early warning radars based on plan position indicator (PPI) displays. A "scan" is a single search of the entire sky made by the rotating antenna. A radar with a low blip-to-scan ratio draws only a few reflections from an object (mainly aircraft), making it more difficult to detect.

For an aircraft flying at high speed and altitude the ratio is further reduced, rendering the aircraft almost invisible to radar. This change in radar signature is also known as the Rodgers effect after its proponent in the US, Franklin Rodgers. The Lockheed U-2 was slated to be replaced by the much faster and stealthier Lockheed A-12 for this very reason. However, upgrades to Soviet radar systems increased their blip-to-scan ratios, rendering the A-12 obsolete before it could be deployed.

== Radar basics ==
Classic radars measure range by timing the delay between sending and receiving pulses of radio signals, and determine the angular location by the mechanical position of the antenna at the instant the signal is received. To scan the entire sky, the antenna is rotated around its vertical axis. The returned signal is displayed on a circular cathode ray tube that produces dots at the same angle as the antenna and displaced from the center by the time delay. The result is a two-dimensional re-creation of the airspace around the antenna. Such a display is called a Plan Position Indicator, usually simply a "PPI".

These dots are known as blips. Under optimal conditions, every pulse sent out by the radar will be returned from a detected object and cause a blip to be displayed on the screen. Larger objects return stronger signals and therefore produce brighter blips. Slower aircraft also produce brighter blips because many returns are drawn at approximately the same location on the display, "adding up".

On Cold War era radar displays, the phosphor coatings on the CRTs were mixed so that they would have a half-life on the order of the rotational speed of the antenna. This meant that the display would show the latest returns from a given object as a bright blip, and older ones as somewhat dimmer blips, as they faded. One might expect three or four such blips on the display, depending on the scanning speed of the antenna. The operator could easily determine the direction of travel, from the dimmest to brightest blip.

== Blip/scan ratios ==
One key characteristic in all radars is the pulse repetition frequency (PRF), which determines the maximum effective range. The time between pulses must be long enough so that a single pulse can reach the maximum range of the system and then return before the next pulse begins. For instance, a radar designed to have a range of 300 kilometres (190 miles) needs to wait 2 milliseconds for a pulse to travel the maximum range and back at the speed of light (300,000 km/s). This means that such a radar can send out, at most, 500 pulses per second (PRF). If the radar sent out 1000 pulses per second, it would be impossible to determine whether a particular reflection came from an object at 150 km from the pulse just sent out, or an object at 300 km reflecting the previous pulse. On the other hand, a 150 km radar requires only 1 millisecond; this makes a PRF of 1000 possible.

Intertwined with the PRF is the length of the pulse, or duty cycle. This determines the minimum range of the system. Longer pulses mean that more energy has the potential to be reflected by the object. However, the radar system cannot detect reflections while it is sending a pulse. To have a 30 km minimum range, for instance, a radar can have pulses no longer than 0.1 ms in duration. For an early warning radar the minimum range is generally not important, so longer pulses are used to maximize the returns, but the duty cycle was nonetheless an important design consideration.

Those two factors combine to determine the strength of the signal returned from a distant object. Using a shorter duty cycle allows for better minimum range, but also means that less radio energy is being sent into space over a given time, reducing the strength of the return signal. Likewise, reducing the PRF in order to improve range has the effect of causing the system to spend more time listening, also reducing the total amount of energy broadcast. This means it is inherently difficult to produce a radar system able to see small objects at long distances, especially one that can also detect those objects at shorter distances. With modern electronics it is relatively simple to arrange for a radar to have different PRFs and duty cycles to allow operation over a wide variety of ranges, but with tube-based electronics from the 1950s this was extremely expensive.

There is also a mechanical effect that also bears on the returned signal. A radar antenna is normally arranged to produce a very narrow beam, in order to improve angular resolution. Beam widths of 2 to 5 degrees are common for long-range radars. Intertwined with beam width is the speed of the antenna’s rotation, because it also determines the amount of time that a spinning radar will spend painting a given object on every scan. For example, consider a radar with a beam width of one degree and an antenna that rotates once every ten seconds, or 36 degrees per second. An object will be painted by the beam for only 1/36 of a second as the one-degree beam sweeps over it. If the radar has a PRF of 500, the object will be painted with 14 pulses per scan at most.

Moreover, Cold-War radar systems were far from perfect. The system created a visible blip on the operator’s display if and only if it received enough returns with enough energy to rise above the background noise of the system. Atmospheric conditions, electronic interference from internal components, and other factors sometimes created false returns known as “clutter”, concealed real returns, or made blips difficult for the operator to interpret correctly.

These design characteristics and susceptibility to glitches combine to determine a radar's blip/scan.

== Avoiding detection ==
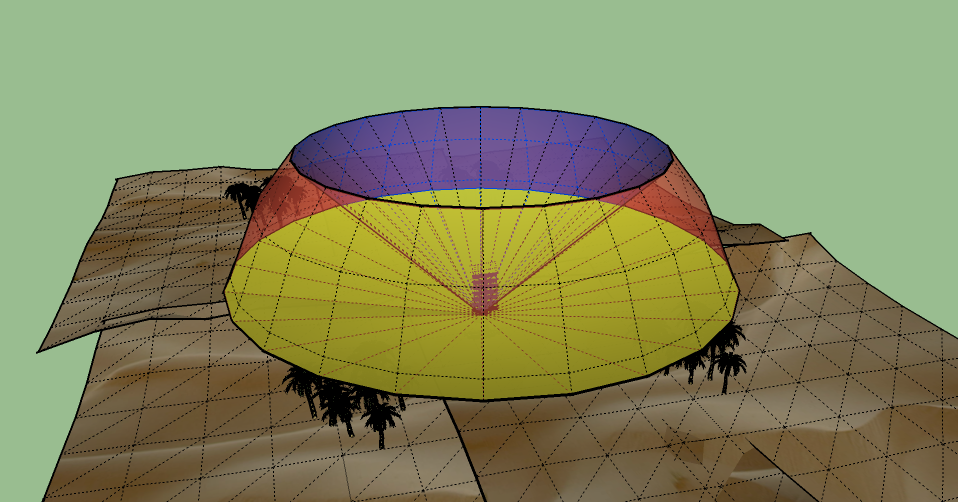
Radars paint only a portion of the sky with their signal. In this image, the yellow surface represents the lowest angles the radar can aim, based on the need to avoid reflections from the local terrain. The purple surface is the maximum angle the antenna can reach, often around 30 to 45 degrees. The red surface is the maximum range of the radar, which is a factor of many design decisions. In this example, an aircraft flying at high altitude would only be detectable for a short time, while passing through the small annular ring between the red and purple surfaces. An aircraft can also approach the radar below the yellow surface.

To understand how these various effects can be used to avoid detection, it is useful to consider a real-world example. During the time period being discussed, one of the most common radars in the Soviet fleet was the P-20 radar and its various modified versions. This had a PRF of about 375 to 750 PPS depending on the mode, its antenna rotated at about 6 RPM and had an angular beamwidth of 2 degrees. Against a bomber-sized target flying at common altitudes, it would have a detection range on the order of 250 kilometres (160 mi). It had a maximum altitude angle of 28 degrees, which meant a significant area above the station was not scanned.

Consider a typical early-era jet aircraft flying at 1000 km/h. With every complete rotation of the antenna, which takes 10 seconds, the aircraft will move 1000 km/h = 278 m/s * 10 = 2780 m, a little less than 3 km. On a display with a 300 km radius this represents a movement of only 0.5% across the display's face (600 km diameter), producing a tiny line segment between the two dots that is easy for an operator to interpret as an aircraft.

But if the target speed is increased, its movement becomes more pronounced on the scope, making it less recognizable and more difficult to track. At Mach 3 (3500 km/h at 25,000 m) the same ten seconds of movement represent over 1.5% of the display's face. At this point, the slowly moving dot turns into a series of dim individual spots, which can more easily be mistaken for clutter. Additionally, since the spots are separated on the display, the returns no longer "add up," potentially reducing the returns to the same level as background noise, making it invisible.

An operator seeing a line of small dots across their screen might eventually recognize the return as an aircraft. To frustrate even this, aircraft were designed to fly as high as possible. Assuming a high-speed aircraft flying at 90,000 feet, or 27 km, this means the aircraft will be above the maximum angle of the radar when it approaches within about 100 kilometres (62 mi) of the station. Assuming it is first detected at 250 kilometres (160 mi), that means it is only visible over a range of 150 kilometres (93 mi). At Mach 3, this means it would be visible, even in theory, for about 3 minutes. This leaves very little time to arrange an interception.

And thus the concept of using the blip/scan to avoid detection. A high-speed, high-altitude aircraft might fly over early warning radars without being recognized. Moreover, even if an operator recognized the blip as an aircraft, the small number of returns and fast movement across the display would make it difficult or impossible to manually calculate a trajectory for relay to intercepting aircraft.

== Aircraft projects ==
Blip/scan spoofing was discovered during the late 1950s, a time when ground-controlled interception of crewed interceptors was the only practical anti-bomber tactic. This led to a miniature arms race in itself, albeit a brief and abortive one.

The Lockheed U-2 flew at high altitude but not at particularly high speed. Even before the U-2 became operational in June 1956, CIA officials estimated that its life expectancy for flying safely over the Soviet Union before the Soviets developed countermeasures would be between 18 months and two years. After overflights began and the Soviets demonstrated the ability to track the U-2 and made credible attempts to intercept it, this estimate was adjusted downward; in August 1956, Richard Bissell reduced the number to six months more. In practice, this window proved slightly longer; but the general point was alarmingly demonstrated in the U-2 Crisis of 1960.

A replacement for the U-2 had been under consideration even before its operational missions began. Originally these studies focused entirely on the reduction of the radar cross section (RCS), but after Franklin Rodgers introduced the idea of spoofing the blip/scan in 1957, the plans were changed to research high-speed, high-altitude designs instead. Lockheed calculated that in order to be effective against known Soviet radars, an aircraft would have to travel between Mach 2 and Mach 3 at 90,000 ft and have an RCS of about 10 square meters. This led to a number of proposals which were down-selected to the Lockheed A-12 and Convair Kingfish.

It was during the development of these aircraft that problems with blip/scan avoidance became clear. It was discovered that the high-temperature exhaust of these aircraft engines reflected radar energy at certain wavelengths, and persisted in the atmosphere for some time. It would be possible for the Soviets to modify their radars to use these frequencies, and thereby track the targets indirectly but reliably.

It was also realized that blip/scan avoidance relied more on a problem in Soviet displays than any inherent issue in the radar itself. This meant that changing the displays could render the technique moot. A system that recorded the radar returns in a computer and then drew the targets on the display as an icon whose brightness was independent of the physical return (a system in which returns did not have to "add up" in order to appear on the display) eliminated the potential for operator confusion. This was particularly worrying, because the USAF was itself in the process of introducing precisely this sort of display as part of their SAGE project.

Finally, the introduction of the first effective anti-aircraft missiles dramatically changed the game. Radars for plotting an air intercept were generally made as long-range as possible in order to give the operators ample time to guide intercept aircraft onto the target as it moved across the display. This led to low blip/scan ratios and inaccurate prediction of aircraft trajectories. This had been compounded by the difficulty of quickly scrambling intercept aircraft.

Missiles solved both of these problems. Missiles stations guided their missiles with their own radar systems, which had maximum ranges only slightly longer than the missile's own flight range, about 40 km in the case of the SA-2 Guideline; therefore they had much higher PRFs, and as a result the blip/scan problems were greatly reduced. Defenders would still have the problem of finding the target in time to prepare for a missile counterattack, but this was by no means as difficult or as time consuming as scrambling crewed aircraft and relying on the radar operator to guide them onto the target before the aircraft left radar range.

By the time the A-12 was operational in the early 1960s the blip/scan avoidance technique was no longer considered useful. The A-12 never flew over the Soviet Union (although it came close to doing so) and was limited to missions against other countries, like Vietnam. Even here the performance of the aircraft proved questionable, and A-12s were attacked by SA-2 missiles on several occasions, receiving minor damage in one flight on 30 October 1967.
