= Mel Vojvodich =

United States Air Force general

Mele Vojvodich
- Born: March 28, 1929; Steubenville, Ohio
- Died: November 3, 2003 (aged 74); Schertz, Texas
- Burial place: Fort Sam Houston National Cemetery
- Military career
- Allegiance: United States of America
- Branch: United States Air Force
- Service years: 1947–1983
- Rank: Major General
- Units: 15th Tactical Reconnaissance Squadron; 388th Tactical Fighter Wing
- Commands: 388th Tactical Fighter Wing
- Conflicts: Korean War; Vietnam War
- Awards: Distinguished Service Cross; Air Force Distinguished Service Medal (2); Legion of Merit (2); Distinguished Flying Cross (5); Meritorious Service Medal; Air Medal (14)

Mele Vojvodich Jr. (March 28, 1929 – November 3, 2003) was an American aviator and major general in the United States Air Force. He was one of the initial five pilots who flew reconnaissance missions in the Lockheed A-12 surveillance aircraft over North Vietnam for the CIA.

== Biography ==
=== Early life ===
Mele Vojvodich Jr. was born in Steubenville, Ohio, to Mele Vojvodic who was Serbian. He graduated from Wintersville High School in Wintersville, Ohio. In June 1947, he joined the US Air Force.

=== Korean War ===
Vojvodich earned his pilot wings in 1950 at Nellis Air Force Base in Nevada. He would see action in the Korean War flying the Lockheed F-80C Shooting Star and the North American F-86. Vojvodich flew a reconnaissance mission 300 miles into communist China to detect the presence of Soviet-made bombers. Vojvodich completed a total of 125 combat missions.

=== Career highlights ===
After returning from Korea, Vojvodich served as Republic F-84 pilot and aircraft commander in the early 1950s at Turner Air Force Base in Georgia. He completed Squadron Officer School at Maxwell Air Force Base in Alabama six years after earning his wings.

=== CIA career ===
Vojvodich volunteered and was selected to fly the Lockheed A-12 for the CIA. He was transferred out of the USAF and "sheep dipped" into the CIA to fly as Government service employee. He would later be reinstated in the USAF.

=== Later career ===
In 1971 he completed studies at the National War College at Fort Lesley J. McNair in Washington DC.

Vojvodich was promoted to major general on May 1, 1980. He accumulated 6,000 flying hours in his career and retired in March 1983.

=== Death ===
Vojvodich died in Schertz, Texas from leukemia in his home on November 3, 2003.

== Military awards ==

United States Air Force Command Pilot Badge
Distinguished Service Cross
Air Force Distinguished Service Medal with bronze oak leaf cluster	Legion of Merit with bronze oak leaf cluster	Distinguished Flying Cross with V device and four bronze oak leaf clusters
Distinguished Flying Cross (second ribbon required for accouterment spacing)	Meritorious Service Medal	Air Medal with two silver and two bronze oak leaf clusters
Air Medal (second ribbon required for accoutrement spacing)	Joint Service Commendation Medal	Air Force Commendation Medal
Army Commendation Medal	Air Force Presidential Unit Citation	Air Force Outstanding Unit Award with two bronze oak leaf clusters
CIA Intelligence Star	Combat Readiness Medal	National Defense Service Medal with bronze service star
Korean Service Medal with two bronze campaign stars	Vietnam Service Medal with bronze campaign star	Air Force Overseas Short Tour Service Ribbon with two bronze oak leaf clusters
Air Force Overseas Long Tour Service Ribbon with bronze oak leaf cluster	Air Force Longevity Service Award with one silver and three bronze oak leaf clusters	Air Force Training Ribbon
Philippine Republic Presidential Unit Citation	Republic of Korea Presidential Unit Citation	Republic of Vietnam Gallantry Cross Unit Citation
United Nations Korea Medal	Vietnam Campaign Medal	Korean War Service Medal

=== Distinguished Service Cross citation ===
The President of the United States of America, under the provisions of the Act of Congress approved July 9, 1918, takes pleasure in presenting the Distinguished Service Cross (Air Force) to Captain Mele Vojvodich, Jr., United States Air Force, for extraordinary heroism in connection with military operations against an armed enemy of the United Nations while serving as a Pilot with the 15th Tactical Reconnaissance Squadron, 67th Tactical Reconnaissance Group, FIFTH Air Force, in action against enemy forces in the Republic of Korea on 3 January 1953. On that date Captain Vojvodich volunteered to fly an unarmed RF-86 type aircraft on an extremely hazardous mission of greatest importance to United Nations forces. Captain Vojvodich, exhibiting outstanding personal courage and skill, flew his unarmed aircraft deep into heavily defended enemy territory despite constant attacks from enemy aircraft. On his way to the target complex, he experienced a complete radio failure, and in addition, his drop tanks failed to jettison. Notwithstanding these obstacles, Captain Vojvodich, recognizing the vital importance of his assigned mission, elected to complete the photograph runs on his targets, exposing himself to firing passes from enemy aircraft. In order to insure complete coverage, Captain Vojvodich returned to re-photograph his first target, despite the presence of numerous enemy aircraft in the area. The intelligence data Captain Vojvodich obtained at great personal risk was of immeasurable value to subsequent United Nations operation in Korea. General Orders: Headquarters, Far East Air Forces: General Orders No. 216 (May 2, 1953)

== See also ==
- USAF units and aircraft of the Korean War
