= Project RAINBOW =

CIA research project

Project RAINBOW was the name given by the CIA to a research project aimed at reducing the radar cross-section of the Lockheed U-2 and lowering the chance that it would be detected and tracked by Soviet radars during its overflights of the USSR. However, the Soviets continued to track the U-2 flights in spite of experimentation with various technological fixes.

== Early flights ==
The U-2 was developed by Lockheed Aircraft Corporation for the CIA to perform aerial reconnaissance overflights of the Soviet Union. Project director Richard M. Bissell assured President Dwight Eisenhower that the aircraft's high altitude (70,000 ft or 21,000 m) would render it invisible to Soviet radars. However, the earliest flights in July 1956 were, in fact, tracked. On 5 July, an A-100 "Kama" radar detected Carmine Vito as he flew over Smolensk, en route to Moscow. The operators even calculated his altitude as twenty kilometers (66,000 feet), which was later rejected by experts who did not believe that an aircraft could fly that high. S-25 Berkut missiles (NATO designation SA-1 Guild) were not kept at the air defense sites around Moscow, and no intercept was attempted.

In mid-August, Bissell assembled a group of advisers to begin work on solving the tracking problem. Among the group were Edwin H. Land, founder of the Polaroid Corporation and head of Project Three the Technological Capabilities Panel; Edward Purcell, a Nobel laureate physicist from Harvard; and Clarence L. "Kelly" Johnson, head of Lockheed Advanced Development Projects (ADP)—the Skunk Works.

The group conducted initial discussions. Then Land went to the MIT Lincoln Laboratory to recruit radar specialists for the work. The leader of the Lincoln Lab team was Franklin Rodgers, associate head of the radar division. Working in isolation from the rest of the lab, his group began trying to find ways to reduce the U-2's radar cross section. As their work progressed, they traveled to California to work with Lockheed and to various military bases to perform radar measurements of U-2s in flight.

Lockheed developed its own expertise in RCS techniques. A small group headed by L. D. MacDonald included chemist Mel George, physicist Edward Lovick, and other scientists and engineers.

== Anti-radar techniques ==
The radar cross-section (RCS) of an object is a measure of how much electromagnetic (EM) energy is reflected by an object, expressed as an area, typically square meters. The RCS of an object is a function of the object's size, shape, and materials. It also varies depending on the frequency of the EM energy. Because long distance search/acquisition radars use different frequencies than short range fire control radars, a variety of techniques would have to be used to protect the U-2.

All parts of the aircraft created reflections—the fuselage, tail, wings, engine inlets and exhaust. The anti-radar techniques investigated fell into two categories, either absorbing the radar energy or creating reflections that interfered with the reflections from the aircraft.

=== Wallpaper ===
Purcell's first concept was an absorption material to be placed on the U-2's fuselage. Developed by the Lincoln Lab team and Lockheed, it became known as "Wallpaper." It consisted of a conductive pattern printed on a flexible sheet called a grid that was then glued to a honeycomb that was then applied to the aircraft. It was intended to be effective against the higher frequency radars.

=== Trapeze ===
To reduce VHF (70 MHz) reflections from the leading and trailing edges of the wings, a wire was placed parallel to and ahead of each wing's leading edge and another parallel to and behind each wing's trailing edge. To anchor the outboard end of each wire, a fiberglass pole was attached to each wingtip to give anchor points ahead and behind the wings. Each wire then ran from the front end of each pole to the slipper tank (which projected in front of the wing) and from the slipper tank to the fuselage. Behind each wing, a wire ran from the back end of the fiberglass pole to the fuselage. The horizontal stabilizer was treated in a similar manner.

To protect the engine inlets, another wire ran diagonally from the nose to the slipper tank on each wing.

This scheme was called "Trapeze."

=== Wires ===
To reduce low-frequency reflections from the fuselage and vertical stabilizer, wires were strung horizontally from the nose of the aircraft to the tail, and horizontally from the leading edge to the trailing edge of the vertical stabilizer. Ferrite beads were placed on the wires to tune them to the expected frequencies. This technique was simply called "Wires."

=== Cost of stealth ===
The disadvantage of Wallpaper was that it was a thermal insulator and trapped heat in the fuselage. Initially it was applied to the upper and lower surfaces, but after the heating problem was recognized, it was applied only to the lower half of the fuselage.

Nevertheless, the overheating proved fatal. On 2 April 1957 pilot Robert Sieker conducted a test flight with Wallpaper applied to the U-2 prototype, Article 341. The heat buildup caused the engine to stall. Without the power to maintain cockpit pressurization, the faceplate on Sieker's helmet popped open and he lost consciousness. Uncontrolled, the U-2 went into a flat spin. Sieker recovered and bailed out, but at too low an altitude and he was killed.

The effect of the Wires and Trapeze installations was increased drag. This cost the U-2 5,000 feet (1,500 m) in altitude and 20% in range. The pilots were not enthusiastic about the reduced performance, nor in flying an aircraft that one of them likened to being "wired like a guitar."

== Operational flights ==
On 6 May 1957, Bissell reported to the President about the progress being made, saying that in operational missions, "the majority of incidents would go undetected." In July the first "dirty bird" arrived at an operational detachment. The first mission of a "Covered Wagon," as they were also known, took place on 21 July 1957. In all, there were nine flights of the treated aircraft. By May 1958, it had become apparent that the system was not effective, and its use ended.

== Follow-on ==
By the fall of 1957, only months after the first deployment of a dirty bird, it had become obvious to Bissell and the scientific team that the treatments would only have a marginal effect on tracking, and that a new aircraft would be needed. By designing anti-radar features from the beginning, it was hoped that the succeeding aircraft would escape detection.

=== Conclusions ===
Bissell and his Air Force assistant, Col. Jack Gibbs, had been in discussions with aircraft and materials manufacturers, as well as various laboratories in an effort to understand what materials and designs might succeed. On 4 December 1957, Bissell conducted a meeting at which the various techniques were summed up:

- Engines and other metal structures inside the aircraft would have to be shielded by reflection.
- Some structural members could not be shielded and would have to be made transparent, by using plastic and eliminating metal components inside.
- For protection against S-band and especially X-band radars, the exterior of the aircraft would have to be shaped to reflect the energy away from the radar unit.
- To reduce reflections, exposed edges would have to be "softened" to have a gradual change in the impedance of the structure.

=== Project GUSTO ===
A large number of people had become aware of Project RAINBOW. To reduce the spread of information about the follow-up, the work was moved into a new project. Called "GUSTO," only those with a need to know were cleared into it. The end result of GUSTO would be the Lockheed A-12 OXCART.
