= Black project =

Highly classified military project

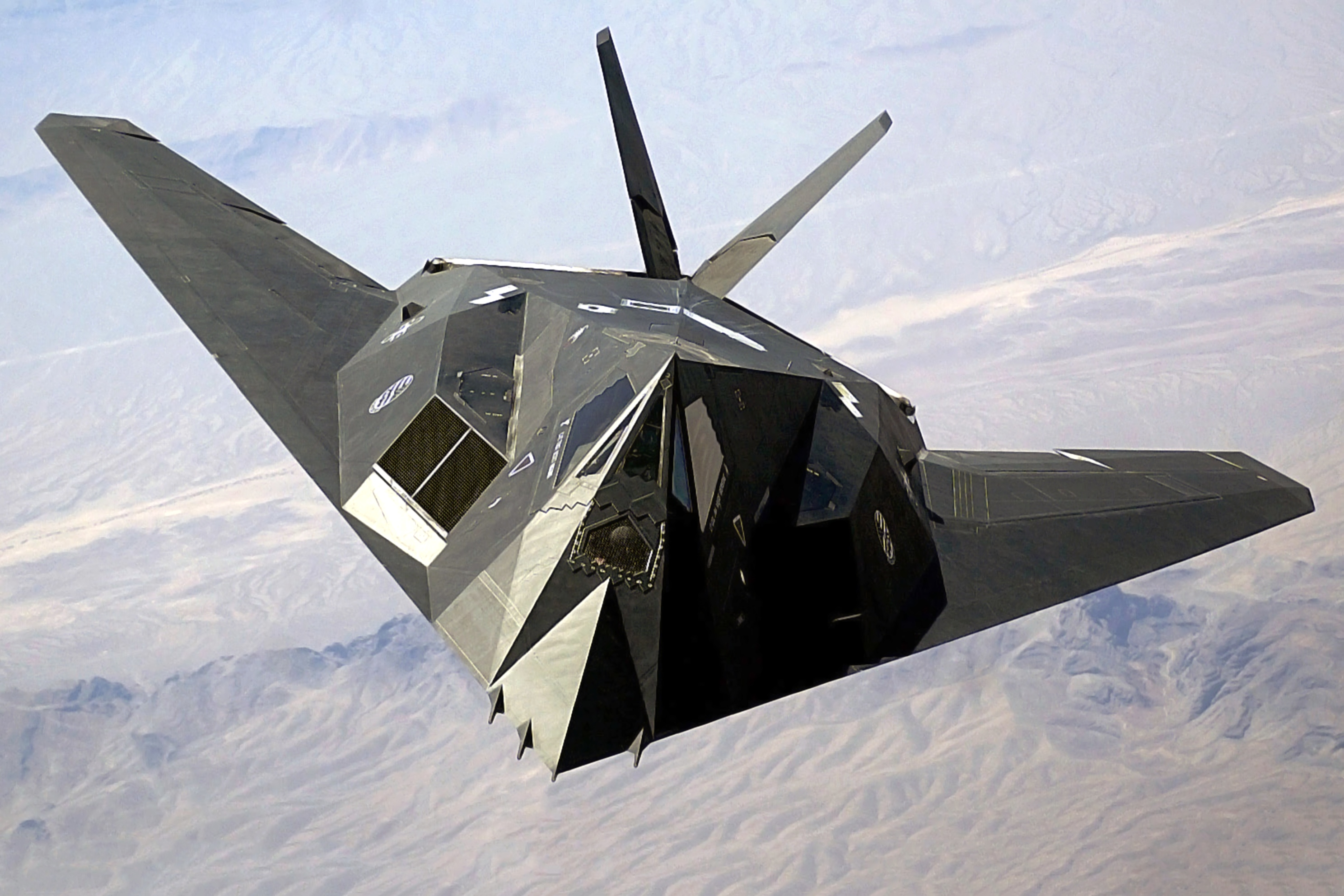
The Lockheed F-117 Nighthawk is an example of an American black project, with its existence being classified information throughout its design and manufacture, as well as for several years after its service commenced.

A black project is a highly classified, top-secret military or defense project that is not publicly acknowledged by a government.

== United States and black projects ==
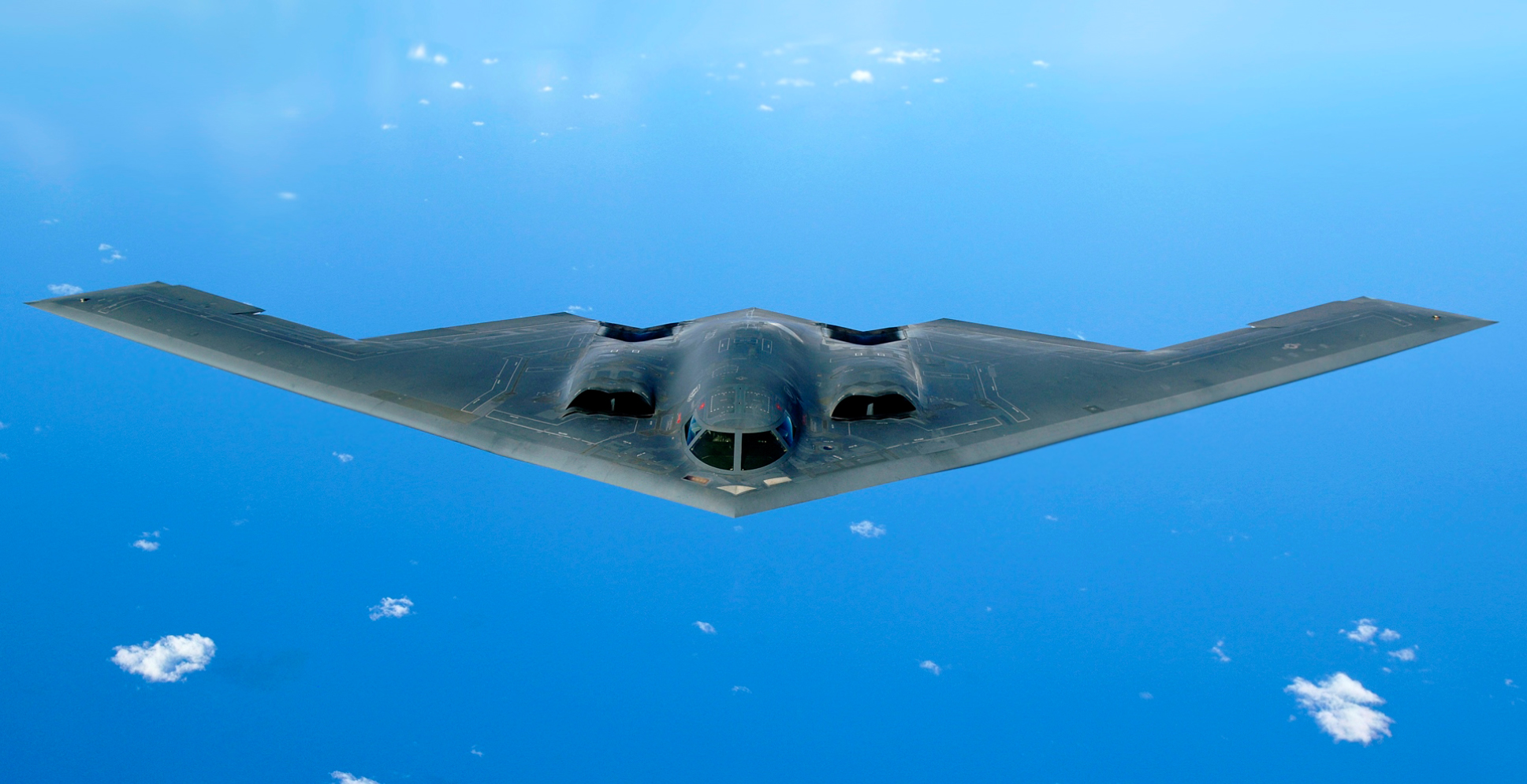
Northrop Grumman B-2 Spirit.

In the United States, the formal term for a black project is an unacknowledged special access program (SAP). Black projects receive their funding from the black budget.

Black projects in the United States are authorized by the CIA Act, allowing the CIA to appropriate money without congressional justification.

Black projects can include weapons, reconnaissance systems, and satellite operations.

The US depends on private defense contractors to develop and build military equipment. The two most notable examples are Lockheed Martin and Northrop Grumman. The R&D department of Lockheed Martin is commonly referred to as Skunk Works; it is responsible for a number of aircraft designs, highly classified R&D programs, and exotic aircraft platforms.

Two well known sites for testing of black projects are the Nevada Test site and Area 51.

In 2007 the US was estimated to spend about $30 billion dollars annually on black projects. In 2011 it was about $56 billion. However, black project funding is deliberately obscured, and some is hidden through the budgets of other agencies.

== Previously unacknowledged ==
Below are examples of previously unacknowledged black projects categorized per country.

=== China ===
- Nuclear weapons program
- Xian H-20 subsonic stealth bomber aircraft

=== France ===
- Nuclear weapons program

=== India ===
- Nuclear weapons programme
- Advanced Technology Vessel project

=== Israel ===
- Nuclear weapons program
- Pereh anti-tank guided missile carrier disguised as a main battle tank
- Barak MX air & missile defense system

=== North Korea ===
- Nuclear weapons program

=== Russia ===
- Kh-47M2 Kinzhal air-launched "Iskander" ballistic missile

=== South Africa (apartheid-era) ===
- Project Coast chemical and biological weapons program
- Atlas Carver multirole fighter aircraft

=== Soviet Union ===
- Nuclear weapons program
- Sputnik 1 artificial Earth satellite
- Typhoon submarine
- Vostok programme human spaceflight project

=== Sweden ===
- Nuclear weapons program (was never completed)

=== Switzerland ===
- Switzerland and weapons of mass destruction

=== United Kingdom ===
- Ultra WW2 decryption programme
- Tube Alloys WW2 nuclear weapons programme
- Bouncing Bombs WW2 weapons programme
- High Explosive Research post-war nuclear weapons programme
- Zircon signals intelligence satellite

=== United States ===
- Boeing Bird of Prey stealth technology demonstrator
- Hughes Mining Barge CIA project authorized 1974 to raise sunken Soviet submarine K-129
- KH-11 Kennen reconnaissance satellite
- Lockheed CL-400 Suntan high-altitude, high-speed reconnaissance prototype
- Lockheed Have Blue stealth technology demonstrator
- Lockheed F-117 Nighthawk stealth ground-attack aircraft
- Lockheed Martin Polecat unmanned aerial vehicle
- Lockheed Martin RQ-170 Sentinel
- Lockheed SR-71 Blackbird Mach 3.3 very high-altitude reconnaissance aircraft
- Lockheed Martin SR-72
- Lockheed U-2 very high-altitude reconnaissance aircraft
- Manhattan Project Nuclear weapons program
- Northrop Grumman B-2 Spirit stealth bomber
- Northrop Grumman B-21 Raider stealth bomber
- Northrop Grumman RQ-180 stealth unmanned aerial vehicle (UAV) surveillance aircraft
- Northrop Tacit Blue
- RQ-3 Dark Star high altitude reconnaissance UAV
- Sikorsky UH-60 Black Hawk stealth helicopter
- Lockheed Sea Shadow (IX-529) experimental stealth US Navy ship

== See also ==
- Black operation
- Compartmentalization (information security)
- Open secret
- List of established military terms
- List of government and military acronyms
- Glossary of military abbreviations
- List of U.S. security clearance terms
