= Victor Sheymov =

Russian computer security expert

- Born: Victor Ivanovich Sheymov; 9 May 1946; Moscow, Soviet Union
- Died: 18 October 2019 (aged 73); Vienna, Virginia, U.S.
- Occupations: Computer security expert, author
- Known for: Defecting from the KGB; inventions in cyber security
- Awards: CIA Distinguished Service Medal
- Espionage activity
- Allegiance: Soviet Union (former); United States
- Rank: Major

Victor Ivanovich Sheymov (9 May 1946 in Moscow – 18 October 2019 in Vienna (Va.)) was a Russian computer security expert, author and patent holder of computer security innovations. A former intelligence official with the rank of major in the Soviet KGB, Sheymov defected to the United States in May 1980, choosing to come out of hiding a decade later.

Since becoming a US citizen, Sheymov was active in the computer security industry as the CEO of Invicta Networks, a Northern Virginia-based developer of advanced cyber-security technologies. He also published a memoir, Tower of Secrets, about his experiences in the KGB and life in the United States.

== Early life ==
Victor Sheymov was born in Moscow on May 9, 1946.

Sheymov was born to a well-educated family, his father an engineer; his mother a doctor specializing in cardiology. He graduated from Moscow State Technical University in 1970, and then worked as a physicist in the Soviet space weapons program.

He was assigned to the KGB, serving in a variety of technical roles in the Eighth Chief Directorate.

== Career in intelligence ==
The Eighth Chief Directorate was responsible for ciphers and communications intercepts. In 1974 Sheymov was posted to the headquarters of the First Chief Directorate in Yasenevo, just outside Moscow, which oversaw all KGB foreign intelligence operations. He served as a communications watch officer, monitoring all incoming KGB message traffic from around the world. Among his responsibilities was helping prepare the daily intelligence summary for members of the Politburo. In 1976 Sheymov was assigned to work on communications security, including such problems as code-breaking and counterespionage. At the time of his defection, Sheymov was responsible for the oversight of all KGB cipher communications.

Although he was successful in his career, Sheymov was increasingly unhappy with life in the Soviet Union as he rose through the ranks of the KGB. Disillusioned with the system, he eventually decided he would have to defect. According to Sheymov, his work with the KGB had allowed him to see the gap between Communist rhetoric and reality; the nature of his job allowing him information available to only a select few.

== Defection ==
In May 1980 Sheymov, his wife Olga, and his five-year-old daughter, Elena, were spirited out of Moscow by officials from the Central Intelligence Agency. Because he had been careful not to leave any evidence of preparation the KGB suspected he and his family had been murdered on a trip out of town. As a result, the KGB leadership was totally unaware of his presence in the United States. The timing was also fortunate – with counterintelligence efforts focused on the upcoming Olympic Games, Sheymov, dressed as an airline pilot, was easily able to avoid detection. His wife and daughter were hidden in a container placed on board an American plane. Although Sheymov and his family were exfiltrated without problems, the planning had been complicated due to his busy work schedule, which included trips to Yemen and possibly other locations. Meanwhile, the need for American intelligence officers to conduct face-to-face meetings with Sheymov to finalize all the details of the operation added to the difficulties. The CIA awarded Sheymov its Distinguished Service Medal.

== Aftermath ==
Because the KGB believed that Sheymov had simply disappeared without trace they regarded all codes and cyphers as secure. Reality did not dawn on them until the summer of 1985, when Aldrich Ames, an American double agent, informed them that the Americans had been tapping the cables coming in and out of Yasenevo since 1980. Sheymov's identity was revealed by the Washington Post in 1990.

Sheymov's liaison with the FBI was Robert Hanssen, who turned out to be a Soviet mole. Shortly before his treachery was uncovered Hanssen had asked Sheymov for a job with his new company, Invicta Networks, though the latter was not willing to give him one. The two had known each other since the late 1980s when Sheymov was a consultant to the National Security Agency and Hanssen was his contact in the FBI.

Victor Sheymov invented the Variable Cyber Coordinates (VCC) method of communications. This method of communications is advantageous for establishing a high level of cyber security. By hopping IP address and other communications parameters, it provides dynamic protection of computers and computer networks through cyber agility. Sheymov was granted numerous patents in the United States, European Union, Australia, Japan, India, Korea, and China. Sheymov testified in the United States Congress as an expert witness. He was a keynote speaker at major government and private industry events at the National Security Agency, at the National Defense Industry convention, at a National Science Foundation symposium among others, and he has been a guest lecturer at universities.

Sheymov also authored articles in The Washington Post, Barron's, World Monitor, National Review and other national publications. He appeared in many national news programs including Larry King Live, 48 Hours, Dateline, McNeil-Lehrer, Charlie Rose and the McLaughlin Report. [5] [6]
