= Lockheed CL-400 Suntan =

Proposed reconnaissance aircraft design

CL-400

General information
- Type: Proposed reconnaissance aircraft
- Manufacturer: Lockheed Aircraft Corporation
- Designer: Clarence L "Kelly" Johnson

Suntan was the code-name of a prototype reconnaissance aircraft program, with the goal of creating a much faster and higher-altitude successor to the U-2, enabled by the use of liquid hydrogen (LH2) as aircraft fuel. The program was cancelled in 1958.

Starting in 1956, the United States Air Force funded a highly secretive program of research and development on high-speed aircraft for long-range reconnaissance. Lockheed's Skunk Works was the natural partner for this work, having successfully delivered the U-2 and having all the required secrecy and security arrangements to keep the program secret.

Lockheed settled on the CL-400 design, which looked like a greatly scaled-up Lockheed F-104 Starfighter. The main change to the layout was the twin engines, mounted on the wing tips. This was done to ensure that the liquid hydrogen, which was stored in the fuselage, would have to pass through the aircraft's hot wings (up to 436 Kelvin) to reach the engines; a vacuum sealed, insulated line was provided to do this. LH2 was selected due to its predictable burning characteristics and the fuel's light weight, although the low density required the enormous fuselage to hold the required fuel load. In addition to Lockheed, Pratt and Whitney played a major part.

Program successes included the concept design of a Mach 2.5 aircraft capable of flying at 100,000 feet, and successful conversion of an existing turbojet engine to run on liquid hydrogen, as well as 25+ hours of testing on a customized LH2 engine design. Techniques for handling LH2 on the ground, including making the fuel, transporting and rapid refuelling systems, were all developed as part of the program.

Ultimately, budgetary pressures and difficulty achieving sufficient range, plus the fact that an LH2-powered aircraft was considered too dangerous and expensive to maintain, led to the project's cancellation. In addition, the unusual fuel would have meant that existing airbases would have needed extensive facilities to handle the aircraft.

However, the aircraft research was redirected to more conventionally fueled designs and resulted in the successful SR-71. By advancing the state of the art in LH2 propulsion, and by establishing an industrial infrastructure for high-volume hydrogen production, the groundwork was laid for successful use of liquid hydrogen as a liquid rocket propellant for the Apollo program and the Space Shuttle.

The existence of the CL-400 was not fully disclosed to the public until the 1970s, when Lockheed discussed the possibility of using hydrogen as an alternative fuel for future aircraft.

== See also ==
- Bristol 188
- Reaction Engines A2
- Skylon (spacecraft)
- Tupolev Tu-155
