= Directorate of Science and Technology =

US government agency

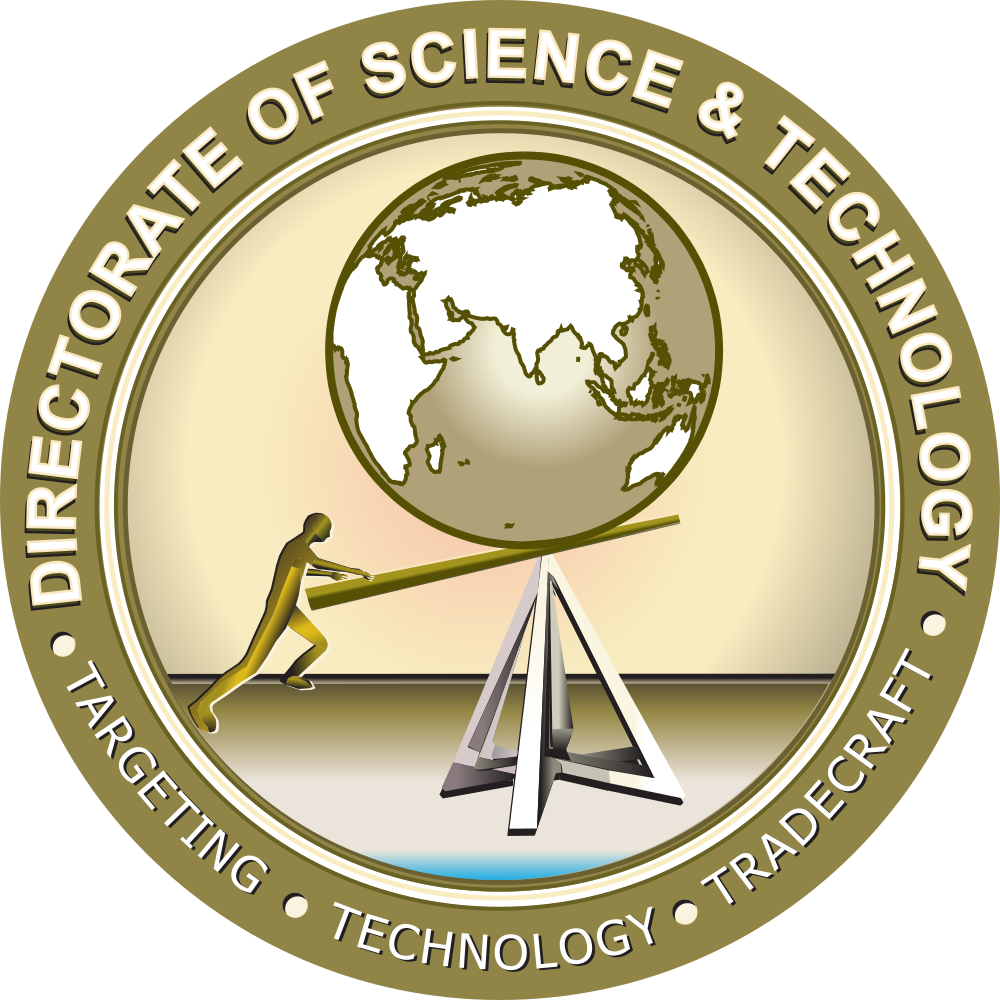
Seal for Directorate of Science & Technology

The Directorate of Science and Technology (DS&T) is the branch of the United States Central Intelligence Agency (CIA) tasked with collecting and analyzing information through technological means and developing technical systems to advance the CIA's intelligence gathering.

== History ==
=== Formation ===
On December 31, 1948, the CIA formed the Office of Scientific Intelligence (OSI) by merging the Scientific Branch in the Office of Reports and Estimates with the Nuclear Energy Group of the Office of Special Operations.

In 1962, the CIA formed the Deputy Directorate of Research (DDR), headed by Herbert Scoville. Under it was the newly formed Office of Special Activities, along with the Office of ELINT and the Office of Research and Development, which were quickly integrated into the DDR. However, the OSI remained part of the Directorate of Operations.

In 1963, Scoville resigned, frustrated by the unwillingness of other departments to transfer their responsibilities. Director of Central Intelligence John McCone asked Albert Wheelon to replace Scoville in the renamed Deputy Directorate of Science and Technology. The OSI was transferred to the Deputy Directorate of Science and Technology, along with the Office of Computer Services.

In 1965, the directorate was renamed to the Directorate of Science and Technology (DS&T), and in 1966, Carl Duckett succeeded Wheelon as the deputy director for Science and Technology.

=== Further changes ===
In April 1973, DCI James Schlesinger transferred the Technical Services Division of the Operations Directorate to the DS&T, where it would be renamed the Office of Technical Services (OTS). Its primary focus was technical support of CIA case officers in the field, including development of exotic weapons and eavesdropping devices and production of forged documents. It developed a poison pen and exploding seashells to assassinate Fidel Castro.

In September 1995, Ruth David replaced James Hirsch as deputy director for Science and Technology, and established three new offices: the Clandestine Information Technology Office, the Office of Advanced Analytical Tools, and the Office of Advanced Projects. The Office of Research and Development was simultaneously abolished.

In April 1999, Gary L. Smith became the deputy director for Science and Technology and resigned nine months later. DCI George Tenet quickly appointed a new deputy director, Joanne Isham.

The Directorate of Science and Technology is organized to accommodate classified personnel based on their technical strengths. Depending on their background and area of expertise, DS&T has:

- Operations Tradecraft: Create solutions to current technical problems using existing tools and designs
- Technical Research: Researching to find solutions to existing problems using theoretical analysis
- Technical Development: Ensuring current projects and intelligence officers are correctly managed through analysis
- Technical Analysis: Conducting "all-source analysis" to reduce the possibility of security faults, especially for the on-ground intelligence officers

While DS&T's organizational structure is based on an expertise agenda, meaning employees are placed into one of the four departments based on their previous knowledge and future aspirations, this directorate can be more easily understood by dividing it into two functionalities. The first is the processing and analysis of collected information, and the second is future technological advances and innovations.

== Projects ==
=== Purpose ===
DS&T is one of five directorates within the CIA, with the other four being administration, analysis, operations, and digital innovation. DS&T plays a special role in the CIA since it provides a wide range of data and intelligence to all other directorates. From here, the various other directorates can take this information, analyze it, and effectively procure it for their needs.

DS&T has morphed into a vast directorate since its inception in 1948. This can be primarily due to the increasing data dependency many countries and societies began to turn towards. The volume of intelligence sifting through to find what is needed can be cumbersome. To help with this data overload, DS&T has grown into a major player within the CIA. Many DS&T employees have provided reliable and accurate information, which has helped to squander negative outcomes within traumatic worldwide events.

=== Project BLUEBIRD, ARTICHOKE and MKULTRA ===
Among its early interests was the use of drugs, hypnosis, and isolation in interrogation. These experiments were conducted under the program Project BLUEBIRD, later known as ARTICHOKE, and MKULTRA, which led to the suicide of Frank Olson, a US Army scientist who was given a dose of LSD.

=== Aerial reconnaissance ===
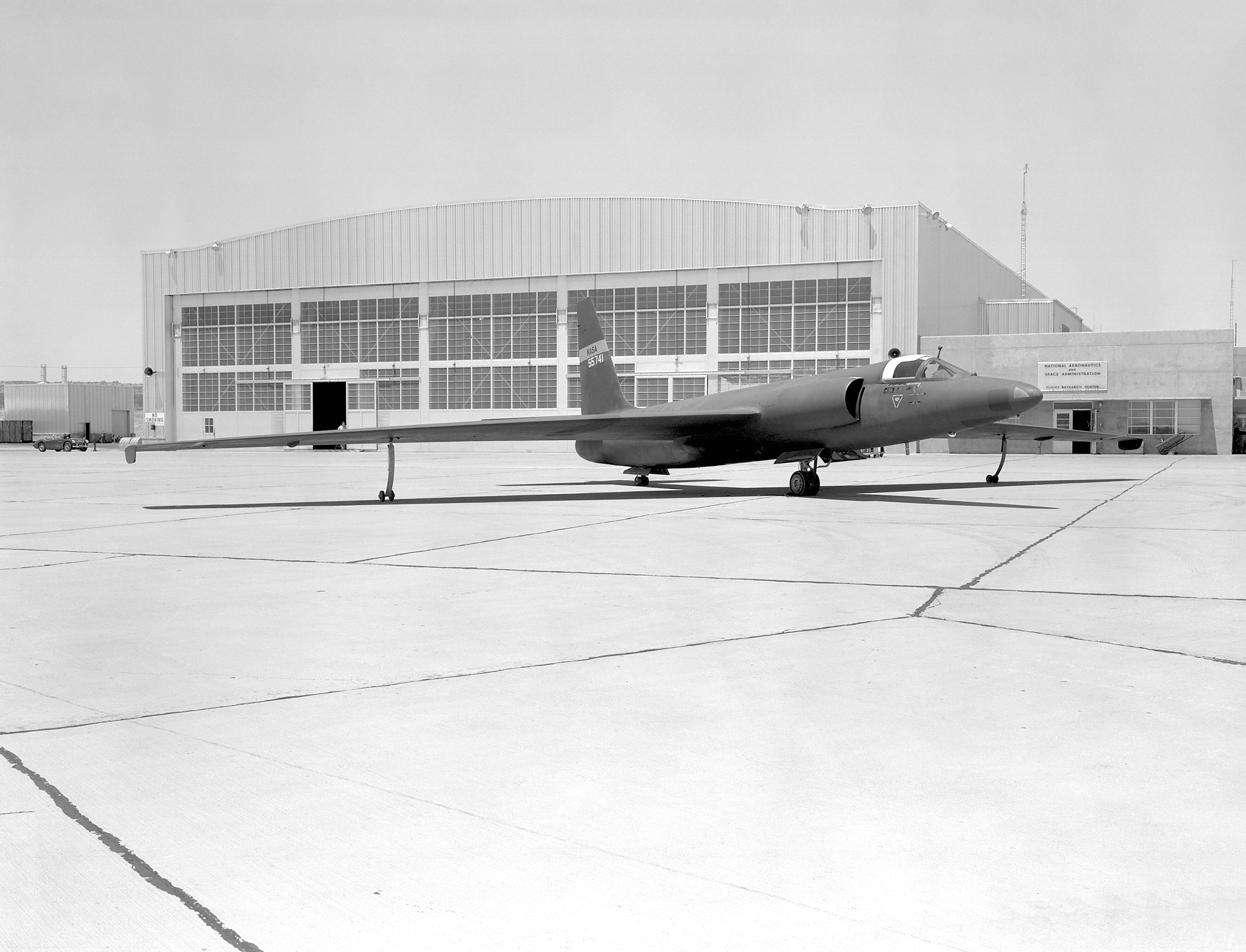
U-2 with fictitious NASA markings to support CIA cover story for pilot Gary Powers, shot down over Soviet Union.

Another of the ONI's earliest programs, started in the early 1950s, was developing and operating the Lockheed U-2 spy plane under the AQUATONE program. This program was transferred to the DDR's Office of Special Activities upon its formation, along with the plans for its successor, known at the time as Project GUSTO, which had begun in 1957 under the direction of Richard Bissell and Edwin Land.

In late 1957, Lockheed's Skunk Works facility under the direction of Clarence Johnson began developing stealthy subsonic reconnaissance aircraft, but in the spring of 1958 turned to supersonic designs, known as the Archangel series. Convair's advanced development group under Robert Widmer was invited to compete with Lockheed, and they proposed the FISH parasite aircraft, derived from their Super Hustler concept. In June 1959, the B-58B launch aircraft for FISH was canceled, and the Convair KINGFISH design was proposed. The Lockheed A-12 was chosen for development, and in the fall of 1959, Project GUSTO was closed, and Project OXCART was started.

=== Spy satellite development ===
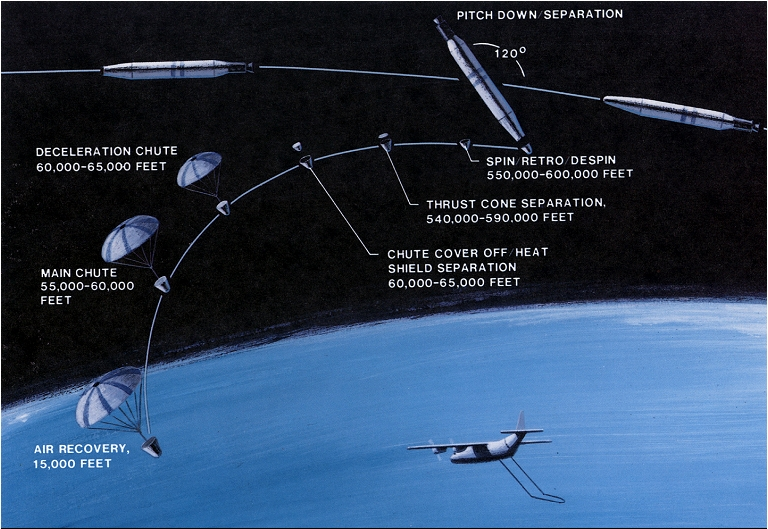
CORONA film recovery process

Also, in 1958, the development of the CORONA Program was started, which was a spy satellite crafted through a joint effort of the CIA and Air Force. CORONA was used to gain intelligence on the USSR's nuclear development. This incredibly advanced program had a variety of daunting tasks. Because of this, 13 unsuccessful attempts were made to get the satellite in orbit with the camera fully functioning. On August 18, 1960, on the 14th launch attempt, CORONA's systems succeeded. With the formation of the Deputy Directorate of Research in 1962, the CORONA and ARGON satellite programs were taken under its wing.

=== ELINT ===
In 1958, the OSI made the first significant attempt to measure the power of a radar for intelligence gathering, known as the Quality ELINT program. It consisted of installing electronic measuring equipment into a C-119 aircraft, and flying missions, disguised as supply-runs, through the air corridors of Germany. This led to the MELODY and PALLADIUM programs, which attempted to gauge the power and sensitivity of Soviet ground-based tracking radars using "ghost aircraft". These programs were integrated into the DDR upon its formation, under the Office of ELINT.

=== Lithium-Iodine Battery ===
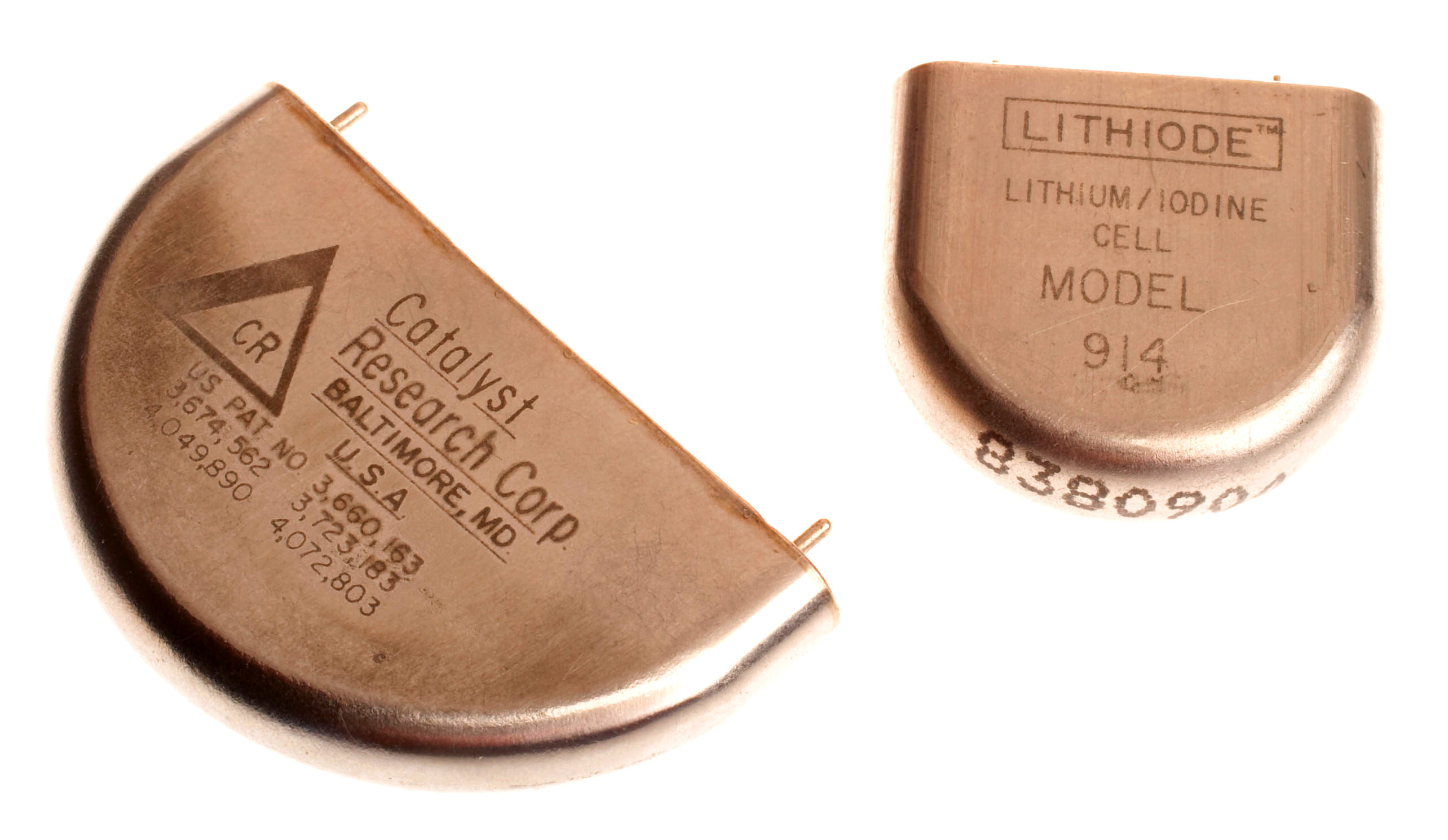
Lithium Iodine Battery used by CIA

The CIA developed and created the concept of long-term, reliable battery life with the lithium-iodine battery. The reasoning for the interest in this technical development was to prolong the battery lifetime of many surveillance equipment used in the field. Once developers within the DS&T perfected the chemical composition in the mid-1960s, it was then declassified to allow for use in the private sector.

=== EarthViewer ===
Surveillance systems are at the core of the CIA's Directorate of Science and Technology. Without the many advances done through EarthViewer brought forward by the CIA's venture capitalist firm In-Q-Tel, Google Earth would be a shell of what it was when it first came out. EarthViewer's imaging possibilities provided the US Government with intelligent information about Iraqi troops and their overall movements. This 3D imaging system enabled CIA operatives to gain intelligent data on these visuals before entering a new region. The detail provided by these images allowed those in the field to acquire precious and accurate coordinate information.

EarthViewer's primary use in the Middle East for reconnaissance was quickly sought after by many news outlets attempting to gain intel into the region. With all this newfound attention, Google sparked an interest and bought the software in 2004 and developed it into Google Earth.

=== Other programs ===
In 1967, the DS&T's Operation Acoustic Kitty attempted to train a surgically altered cat, wired with transmitting and control devices, to become a mobile, eavesdropping platform.

In 1975, the DS&T funded remote viewing experiments at the Stanford Research Institute, where remote viewers were asked to determine details about targets in the USSR. It was not judged to be a success.
