= Wormwood (miniseries) =

2017 American documentary television series

- Genre: Docudrama; Psychological drama
- Directed by: Errol Morris
- Starring: Peter Sarsgaard; Molly Parker; Christian Camargo; Scott Shepherd; Tim Blake Nelson; Jimmi Simpson; Bob Balaban; Michael Chernus
- Composer: Paul Leonard-Morgan
- Country of origin: United States
- Original language: English
- No. of episodes: 6

Production
- Executive producers: Adam Del Deo; Peter Friedlander; Lisa Nishimura; Errol Morris; Robert Fernandez; Caroline Baron
- Running time: 40-48 minutes
- Production companies: Fourth Floor Productions; Moxie Pictures

Original release
- Network: Netflix
- Release: 15 December 2017

Wormwood (styled as 'WORMWO0D') is a 2017 American six-part docudrama miniseries directed by Errol Morris and released on Netflix on December 15, 2017. The series is based on the life of a scientist, Frank Olson, who worked for a secret government biological warfare program (the USBWL) at Fort Detrick, Maryland. It focuses on the events leading up to and following his controversial death, which the US government originally claimed was a tragic accident, but later admitted was likely a suicide, caused by a mental breakdown brought on after being unknowingly dosed with LSD, while at a meeting with colleagues from the CIA who were involved in Project MKUltra. It also follows Frank Olson's son in the present day, and discusses his belief that his father may have been murdered due to being perceived as a potential security risk. Interspersed between interviews and archival footage, are live action reenactments of the final days of Frank Olson's life and the various theories involving his death.

== Synopsis ==
Wormwood is told through Eric Olson, the son of Frank Olson, an American biological warfare scientist and Central Intelligence Agency (CIA) employee, who died under mysterious circumstances in 1953.

Nine days after Olson was covertly dosed with LSD by CIA's Sidney Gottlieb, head of Project MKUltra, he plunged to his death from the window of a hotel room in New York City. His death was initially regarded as a suicide, but subsequent investigations have raised questions of a coverup of an alleged murder.

The title Wormwood is a double literary allusion: first to the Bible verse about a star that infects one-third of Earth's waters and makes them bitter and poisonous, a reference to biological weapons (in particular, allegations of American biological warfare in the Korean War), and the 'bitter' effect on Eric Olson of his 60-year search for a resolution regarding the death of his father; secondly, to a line in Shakespeare's Hamlet (whose story arc the documentary suggests parallels Eric's own life), when Hamlet whispers, "Wormwood, Wormwood", at the moment its play-within-a-play implies evidentially that his father was, in fact, assassinated. The documentary ends with Eric Olson describing the quest for the truth about his father's death as "Wormwood", having consumed his whole life and with no possibility that any closure, positive or negative, would have released him from the bitterness of the loss anyway. Director Errol Morris said that "What Wormwood tries to do is tell a story about how we know what we know and how reliable is that knowledge."

A key piece of evidence the film relies on is a CIA assassination manual from 1953, which instructs agents, "The most efficient accident, in simple assassination, is a fall of 75 feet or more onto a hard surface."

== Cast ==
=== Interviews ===
- Eric Olson
- David Rudovsky, family attorney
- Seymour Hersh
- Stephen Saracco

=== Reenactments ===
- Peter Sarsgaard as Frank Olson – Biochemist
- Molly Parker as Alice Olson – Wife
- Christian Camargo as Dr. Robert Lashbrook – CIA
- Scott Shepherd as Lt. Col. Vincent Ruwet
- Tim Blake Nelson as Sidney Gottlieb
- Jimmi Simpson as CIA agent
- Michael Chernus as Mal
- Bob Balaban as Dr. Harold A. Abramson – Allergist
- Stephen DeRosa as Armond Pastore - Hotel Night Manager
- Chance Kelly as Wet Works #2

== Production ==
In order to be eligible for the Academy Award for Best Documentary Feature at the 90th Academy Awards, the series was recut into a continuous feature after the Academy of Motion Picture Arts and Sciences (AMPAS) ruled that multi-part documentary series (such as 2017 winner O.J.: Made in America) were ineligible. However, the series was rejected from consideration by AMPAS for the documentary feature category, although it remained eligible in all other categories.

== Episodes ==
No.	Title	Directed by	Written by	Original release date
1	"Chapter 1: Suicide Revealed"	Errol Morris	Kieran Fitzgerald and Steven Hathaway & Molly Rokosz	December 15, 2017
In 1953, Army scientist Frank Olson takes a fatal plunge from a hotel window. In 1975, a bombshell report ties his death to a top-secret experiment.
2	"Chapter 2: A Terrible Mistake"	Errol Morris	Steven Hathaway & Molly Rokosz and Kieran Fitzgerald	December 15, 2017
Amid a wave of media attention, the government races to placate the family. In New York, Frank visits a doctor known for his unconventional methods.
3	"Chapter 3: The Forbidden Threshold"	Errol Morris	Story by : Kieran Fitzgerald and Steven Hathaway & Molly Rokosz; Teleplay by : Steven Hathaway & Molly Rokosz	December 15, 2017
One trip to New York morphs into two when Frank suffers a setback on the way home. Decades later, an apprehensive Eric checks into room 1018A.
4	"Chapter 4: Opening the Lid"	Errol Morris	Story by : Kieran Fitzgerald and Steven Hathaway & Molly Rokosz; Teleplay by : Steven Hathaway & Molly Rokosz	December 15, 2017
A hotel worker overhears a curious phone call the night of Frank's death. In 1994, a forensics expert exhumes the body to find compelling new clues.
5	"Chapter 5: Honorable Men"	Errol Morris	Story by : Kieran Fitzgerald; Teleplay by : Steven Hathaway & Molly Rokosz and Kieran Fitzgerald	December 15, 2017
Frank's growing concerns about Cold War activities raise alarm bells at the CIA. A frustrated Eric launches a last-ditch bid for closure.
6	"Chapter 6: Remember Me"	Errol Morris	Story by : Kieran Fitzgerald; Teleplay by : Steven Hathaway & Molly Rokosz and Kieran Fitzgerald	December 15, 2017
Thanks to Seymour Hersh, Eric finally learns the truth—but at a maddening cost. In room 1018A, Frank faces off with two mysterious men.

== Release ==
The series was first screened at the 74th Venice International Film Festival and Telluride Film Festival in September 2017.

== Reception ==
The New York Times awarded it a NYT Critic's Pick with reviewer A. O. Scott saying "Mr. Morris presents a powerful historical argument in the guise of a beguiling work of cinematic art — and vice versa." Matt Zoller Seitz, writing for Vulture.com, "The filmmaking gathers all the bits and pieces of the story together and arranges them in ways that are clever, surprising, and so aggressively (and deliberately) self-conscious that there are times when the whole thing gets close to turning into an intellectualized formal exercise...there’s never a moment where Olson or Morris fail to fascinate." Vanity Fair called it "one of the most original things you’ll see all year."

On review aggregator website Rotten Tomatoes, the series holds an approval rating of 90% based on 52 reviews, and an average rating of 7.8/10.
