= CIA activities in the United States =

Central Intelligence Agency
- Seal of the Central Intelligence Agency

- Flag of the Central Intelligence Agency

Intelligence agency overview
- Formed: September 18, 1947; 79 years ago
- Preceding Intelligence agency: Office of Strategic Services
- Headquarters: George Bush Center for Intelligence Langley, Virginia, U.S.; 38°57′07″N 77°08′46″W
- Motto: "The Work of a Nation. The Center of Intelligence."; Unofficial motto: "And you shall know the truth and the truth shall make you free." (John 8:32)
- Employees: 21,575 (estimate)
- Annual budget: $15 billion (as of 2013)
- Intelligence agency executive: William J. Burns, Director
- Parent Intelligence agency: None (independent)
- Website: cia.gov

The Central Intelligence Agency (CIA) is a civilian foreign intelligence service of the United States federal government, tasked with gathering, processing, and analyzing national security information from around the world.

The National Resources Division is the domestic wing of the CIA. Although the CIA is focused on gathering intelligence from foreign nations, it has performed operations within the United States to achieve its goals. Some of these operations only became known to the public years after they had been conducted, and were met with significant criticism, with allegations that these operations may violate the Constitution.

== 1950 ==
Starting in 1950, the CIA researched and experimented with the use of possible mind-control drugs and other chemical, biological and radiological stimuli on both willing and uninformed subjects. The purpose of these programs was to "investigate whether and how it was possible to modify an individual's behavior by covert means."

CIA Director Roscoe H. Hillenkoetter approved the first mind-control study, named Project BLUEBIRD, which was later renamed Project ARTICHOKE.

=== Crusade for Freedom ===
1950 was the beginning of the Crusade for Freedom, a ten-year campaign to generate domestic support for Radio Free Europe (and to conceal the CIA as the primary source of RFE's funding).

=== Project MK-ULTRA ===
Project MKULTRA was a CIA program which involved, among other projects, research on the use of drugs in behavior modification. One of the most controversial cases arising from the program was the death of Dr. Frank Olson, a scientist who worked in the Special Operations Division of the U.S. Army Biological Center in Camp Detrick, Maryland. According to the Church Committee, as part of the MK-ULTRA experiments, Olson was given a dose of LSD without his knowledge, and eventually suffered a severe psychiatric response. The CIA sent him to New York to see one of their psychiatrists, who recommended that Olson be placed into a mental institution for recovery. While spending the evening in a hotel room with another CIA employee, Olson threw himself out his hotel room window, plunging to his death. Olson's family members have contested this account. Later forensic evidence conflicted with the official version of events; when Olson's body was exhumed in 1994, cranial injuries indicated that Olson had been knocked unconscious before he exited the window.

== 1951 ==
=== Forerunner of Domestic Contact Service/OSINT ===
This function, run by the Domestic Contact Service (also called the Domestic Contact Division) of the CIA, was legal, as it did not violate the CIA prohibitions of police power or spying on Americans. It was a voluntary debriefing of Americans with useful information. It is now considered part of Open Source Intelligence OSINT.

=== Office of Current Intelligence ===
President Truman created the Office of Current Intelligence which was directed by Huntington D. Sheldon. This was a renamed and extended version of the World War II section of the OSS that gave White House and other high-level briefings.

== 1952-1975 ==
A number of projects, some run by the NSA and some by the CIA, intercepted mail and electronic communications of US citizens in the United States. These programs were, by 1975, discontinued as illegal without warrants. Various interception programs under the George W. Bush administration have been restarted, although these are only allowed for communication with foreign nationals, and claims no warrants are needed under the doctrine of unitary authority.

CIA, and the rest of the intelligence community, receives product from thousands of NSA SIGINT programs. During this same period, CIA received extensive SIGINT on Southeast Asia and the Soviet bloc, and the rest of the world, and used this in preparing analytical products. Among these, for example, are nearly 200 National Intelligence Estimates on Southeast Asia, plus monthly summaries for Vietnam and specific studies relevant to military operations.

Among these were Project SHAMROCK and Project MINARET, in which the NSA, upon request by the FBI and CIA, intercepted communications of American citizens.

The CIA also operated Operation CHAOS with subprograms MERRIMAC and RESISTANCE, which were domestic spying operations designed to detect threats to CIA operations and facilities. Through these programs, the CIA's Office of Security received information from US based informants regarding individuals and groups with anti-war views.

These programs were judged inappropriate by the Director of the National Security Agency and shut down by 1975.

Another program, HTLINGUAL intercepted physical mail, first simply recording the source and destination addresses on the envelope, and later surreptitiously opening and reading mail. This ran from 1952 to 1973.

== 1973 ==
"After Colby left the Agency on January 28, 1976, and was succeeded by George Bush, the CIA announced a new policy: “Effective immediately, the CIA will not enter into any paid or contractual relationship with any full‑time or part‑time news correspondent accredited by any U.S. news service, newspaper, periodical, radio or television network or station” At the time of the announcement, the Agency acknowledged that the policy would result in termination of less than half of the relationships with the 50 U.S. journalists it said were still affiliated with the Agency. The text of the announcement noted that the CIA would continue to “welcome” the voluntary, unpaid cooperation of journalists. Thus, many relationships were permitted to remain intact."

== 1977 ==
According to a 1977 New York Times article, the CIA conducted a covert propaganda campaign to squelch criticism of the Warren Report. The CIA urged its field stations to use their "propaganda assets" to attack those who didn't agree with the Warren Report. In a dispatch from CIA Headquarters, the Agency instructed its stations around the world to:

1. counteract the "new wave of books and articles criticising the [Warren] Commission's findings...[and] conspiracy theories ...[that] have frequently thrown suspicion on our organisation";
2. "discuss the publicity problem with liaison and friendly elite contacts, especially politicians and editors;" and
3. "employ propaganda assets to answer and refute the attacks of the critics. ... Book reviews and feature articles are particularly appropriate for this purpose. ... The aim of this dispatch is to provide material for countering and discrediting the claims of the conspiracy theorists..."

== 2001 ==
Soon after 9/11, The New York Times released a story stating that the CIA's New York field office was destroyed in the wake of the attacks. According to unnamed CIA sources, while first responders were conducting rescue efforts, a special CIA team was searching the rubble for both digital and paper copies of classified documents. This was done according to well-rehearsed document recovery procedures put in place after the Iranian takeover of the United States Embassy in Tehran in 1979. While it was not confirmed whether the agency was able to retrieve the classified information, it is known that all agents present that day fled the building safely.

While the CIA insists that those who conducted the attacks on 9/11 were not aware that the agency was operating at 7 World Trade Center under the guise of another (unidentified) federal agency, this center was the headquarters for many notable criminal terrorism investigations. Though the New York field offices' main responsibilities were to monitor and recruit foreign officials stationed at the United Nations, the field office also handled the investigations of the August 1998 bombings of United States Embassies in East Africa and the October 2000 bombing of the USS Cole. Despite the fact that the CIA's New York branch may have been damaged by the 9/11 attacks and they had to loan office space from the US Mission to the United Nations and other federal agencies, there was an upside for the CIA.

== 2014 ==
In July 2014 CIA Director John O. Brennan had to apologize to lawmakers because five CIA employees (two lawyers and three computer specialists) had surreptitiously searched Senate Intelligence Committee files and reviewed some committee staff members' e-mail on computers that were supposed to be exclusively for congressional investigators. Brennan ordered the creation of an internal personnel board, led by former senator Evan Bayh, to review the agency employees' conduct and determine "potential disciplinary measures." However, according to some reports, Brennan didn't apologize for spying or doing anything wrong at all, even though his agency had been improperly accessing computers of the Senate Select Intelligence Committee (SSCI) and then, in the words of investigative reporter Dan Froomkin, "speaking a lie". This accusation was based on the CIA Director's earlier denials of Senator Dianne Feinstein's claims that the surreptitious CIA search of the SSCI computers occurred, was inappropriate, or "violated the separation of powers principles embodied in the United States Constitution, including the Speech and Debate clause" or other laws.
