= One-Million-Liter Test Sphere =

- U.S. National Register of Historic Places
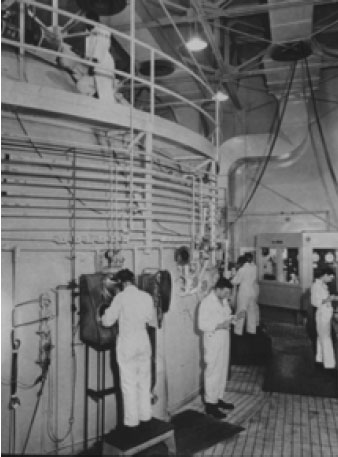

- Location within Maryland Location within the United States
- Nearest city: Frederick, Maryland
- Coordinates: 39°26′3.36″N 77°25′44.52″W
- Area: less than one acre
- Built: 1951
- NRHP reference No.: 77000696
- Added to NRHP: November 23, 1977

The One-Million-Liter Test Sphere—also known as the Test Sphere, the Horton Test Sphere, the Cloud Study Chamber, Building 527, and the "Eight Ball" (or "8-ball")—is a decommissioned biological warfare (BW) chamber and testing facility located on Fort Detrick, Maryland, US. It was constructed and utilized by the U.S. Army Biological Warfare Laboratories as part of its BW research program from 1951 to 1969. It is the largest aerobiology chamber ever constructed and was placed on the National Register of Historic Places in 1977.

== The structure ==
The stainless steel test sphere, a cloud chamber used to study static microbial aerosols, is a four-story high, 131-ton structure. Its 1-inch-thick (25 mm), carbon steel hull was designed to withstand the internal detonation of "hot" biological bombs without risk to outsiders. It was originally contained within a cubical brick building.

Its purpose was the study of infectious agent aerosols and testing of pathogen-filled munitions. The device was designed to allow exposure of animals and humans to carefully controlled numbers of organisms by an aerosol (inhalational) route. Live, tethered animals were inserted into the chamber along with BW bombs for exposure tests. Human volunteers breathed metered aerosols of Q fever or tularemia organisms through ports along the perimeter of the sphere.

== History (1947–1969) ==
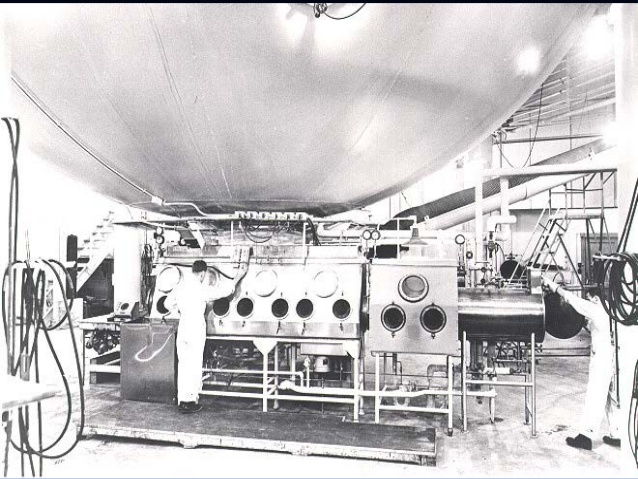
The bottom of the sphere, in use

Herbert G. Tanner, the head of Camp (now Fort) Detrick's Munitions Division, had envisioned an enclosed environment where biological tests could be conducted on site, rather than at remote places like Dugway Proving Ground, Utah and Horn Island, Mississippi.

The facility was constructed during 1947 and 1948 and became operational at Camp Detrick in 1950.

The test sphere was utilized during the Operation Whitecoat studies (1954–73), the first exposure taking place on January 25, 1955.

== History (1969-present day) ==
The test sphere has not been used since 1969, when the US offensive BW program was disestablished by President Nixon. The brick building housing the test sphere was destroyed by fire in 1974. However, the chamber itself was placed on the National Register of Historic Places in 1977.

== See also ==
- Aerobiology
- United States Army Medical Research Institute of Infectious Diseases
- United States biological weapons program
- Building 470
