= Sidney Gottlieb =

American chemist and spymaster

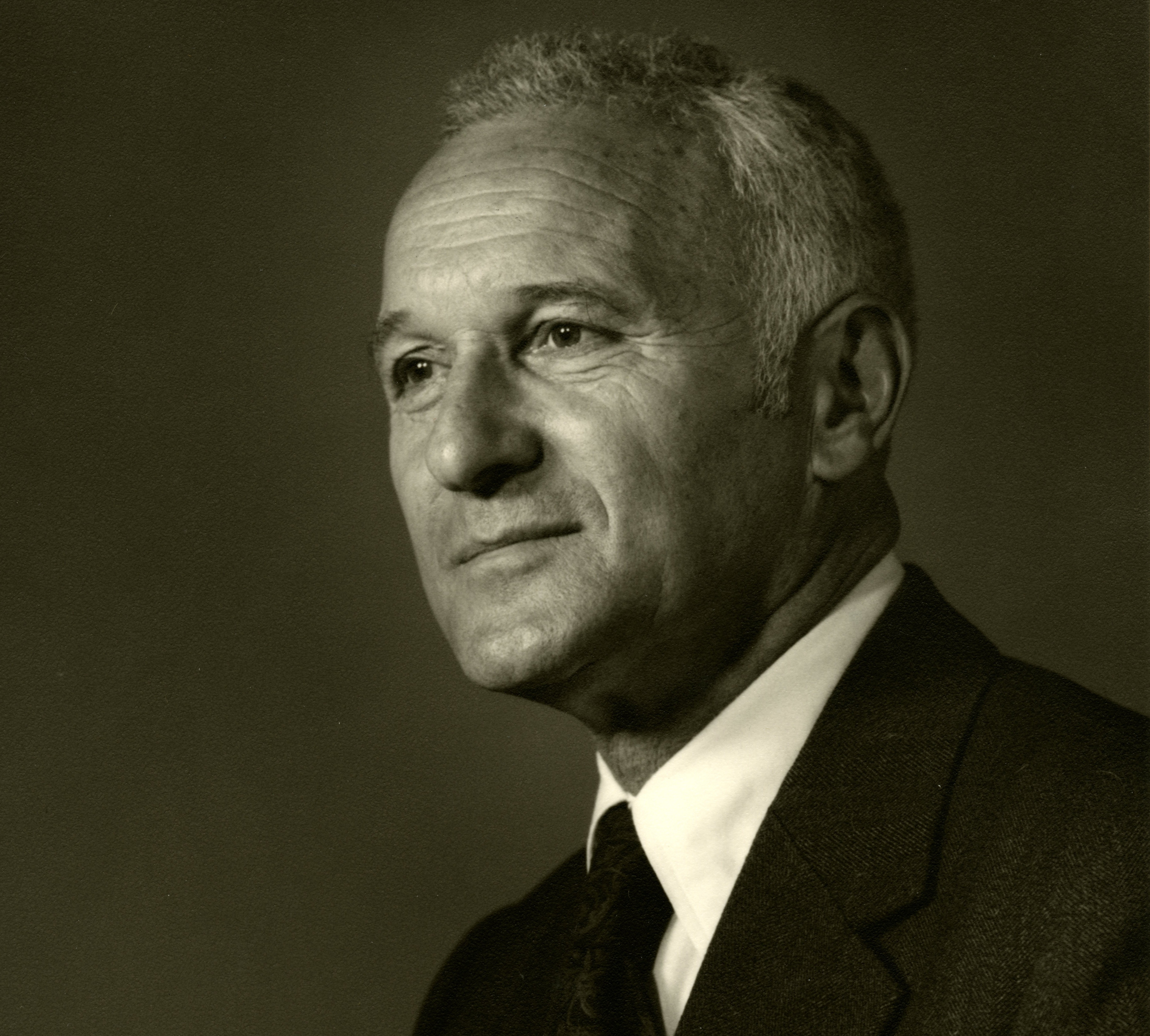

Director of the Technical Services Staff
- In office 1967–1972
- Preceded by: Stanley Platt Lovell

Chief of the Chemical Division, Technical Services Staff
- In office 1951–1967
- Appointed by: Ira Baldwin

Personal details
- Born: August 3, 1918 New York City, New York, U.S.
- Died: March 7, 1999 (aged 80) Washington, Virginia, U.S.
- Spouse: Margaret Moore (m. 1942)
- Children: 4
- Education: Arkansas Tech University; University of Wisconsin; California Institute of Technology; San Jose State University
- Known for: Project MK-Ultra

Sidney Gottlieb (August 3, 1918 – March 7, 1999) was an American chemist and spymaster who headed the Central Intelligence Agency's 1950s and 1960s assassination attempts and mind-control program, known as Project MKUltra.

== Early years and education ==
Gottlieb was born to Hungarian Jewish immigrant parents Fanny and Louis Gottlieb in the Bronx on August 3, 1918. His older brother was plant biologist David Gottlieb. A stutterer since childhood, he earned a master's degree in speech therapy from San Jose State University after retiring from the CIA. He was born with a club foot, which got him rejected from military service in World War II but did not prevent his pursuit of folk dancing, a lifelong passion.

Gottlieb graduated from James Monroe High School in 1936, and enrolled in the free City College in NYC. He decided to transfer to a school that offered an agricultural biology course, and wished to attend the University of Wisconsin. In order to take the specialized courses he wished to have, he first attended Arkansas Tech University, where he studied botany, organic chemistry, and principles of dairying. His success at ATU won him admission to the University of Wisconsin, where he was mentored by Ira Baldwin, the assistant dean of the College of Agriculture. Gottlieb graduated magna cum laude in 1940. His accomplishments at the university, paired with a glowing recommendation from Baldwin, won him admission to the California Institute of Technology, where he received his Doctorate in Biochemistry in June 1943, writing his thesis: Studies on a Growth Inhibitor in Guayule. Gottlieb, Sidney (1943), Dissertation (Ph.D.), California Institute of Technology. doi:10.7907/TBXH-5W50.

In his youth, Gottlieb was a socialist, having joined the Young People's Socialist League while attending the University of Wisconsin.

Gottlieb met his wife, Margaret Moore, the daughter of a Presbyterian missionary, while attending CIT. Denied the chance of military service, he sought out another way to serve, and began looking for government work in Washington. By 1948, his wife and two daughters were living in a cabin near Vienna, Virginia, that had no electricity or running water. He was living there when he began working for the Central Intelligence Agency (CIA). His lifestyle was in contrast to that of the Ivy League men the CIA normally recruited.

== Government career ==
Gottlieb's first government position was at the United States Department of Agriculture, where he researched the chemical structure of organic soils. He later transferred to the Food and Drug Administration, where he developed tests to measure the presence of drugs in the human body. Gottlieb grew bored with this work and sought a more challenging position. In 1948, he found a job at the National Research Council, where he described being "exposed to some interesting work concerning ergot alkaloids as vasoconstrictors and hallucinogens." He soon relocated to the University of Maryland as a research associate dedicated to studying metabolisms of fungi.

On July 13, 1951, Gottlieb reported for his first day of work for the CIA. Then-Deputy Director for Operations Allen Dulles hired him on Ira Baldwin's recommendation. Baldwin had founded and run the biowarfare program at Fort Detrick years earlier, and had kept Gottlieb in his orbit. Gottlieb had advanced knowledge about poisons. In the 1950s, Communist infiltration concerned many Americans. These Cold War-era fears also contributed to the CIA expanding its experimental methods over the next two decades, worrying that the USSR and The People's Republic of China had already mastered brainwashing and were using it against their own citizens and prisoners.

Project BLUEBIRD was already underway when Gottlieb was brought on board; BLUEBIRD experimented with "Special Interrogation" techniques on captured prisoners at black sites like Camp King and Villa Schuster, using drugs to attempt to break ego control and elicit information. BLUEBIRD lacked scientific knowledge and discipline; Dulles wanted Gottlieb to get it back on course. After proceeding through training, he was named chief of the newly formed Chemical Division of the Technical Services Staff (TSS). On August 20, 1951, Dulles ordered BLUEBIRD expanded, centralized, and renamed; the newly renamed Project Artichoke became a power base for Gottlieb. Dulles was promoted to Deputy Director of Central Intelligence shortly after expanding Artichoke's scale.

Dulles and Gottlieb both believed there was a way to influence and control the human mind that could lead to global mastery. They also wanted a "truth serum", something that had been investigated during the days of the OSS but never fully realized. Gottlieb conducted experiments using THC, cocaine, heroin, and mescaline before realizing LSD had not been properly tested or investigated by the agency. After trying LSD for the first time himself, Gottlieb accelerated LSD experiments at the agency, testing it on agents who agreed to be dosed under controlled environments and some who agreed to be dosed by surprise. LSD had been synthesized only 13 years earlier. After months of experimenting on agents, Gottlieb sought help from the Special Operations Division at Detrick.

Gottlieb's first 18 months at the agency led to some frustrating discoveries. The drugs he was experimenting with were not the "truth serums" he had hoped, and often hindered interrogations rather than aiding them. He knew Dulles, now the Director of Central Intelligence under President Eisenhower, would approve his proposals. Gottlieb and Richard Helms, then-Chief of Operations for Directorate of Plans, wrote a memorandum to send to Dulles. Dulles formally approved Project MKUltra on April 13, 1953. His brother, John Foster Dulles, was appointed Secretary of State, giving further diplomatic cover to the project. On April 10, Dulles described the program and others like it in a speech to alumni of Princeton University, referencing the new battlefield of "brain warfare" as the battle for controlling the human mind. He described the program as something the Soviet Union was doing rather than something the CIA was pioneering.

Gottlieb selected multiple researchers, scientists, and ex-OSS members to work for him under MK-ULTRA "subprojects." Those contracted conducted experiments on Gottlieb's behalf and reported their findings to him. He sponsored physicians such as Donald Ewen Cameron and Harris Isbell in controversial psychiatric research, including non-consensual human experiments.

Gottlieb administered LSD and other hallucinogenic drugs to unwitting subjects and financed psychiatric research and development of "techniques that would crush the human psyche to the point that it would admit anything". He was named as the person who gave Army bacteriologist Frank Olson LSD at an MK-ULTRA retreat, leading to Olson's mental spiral and death a week later.

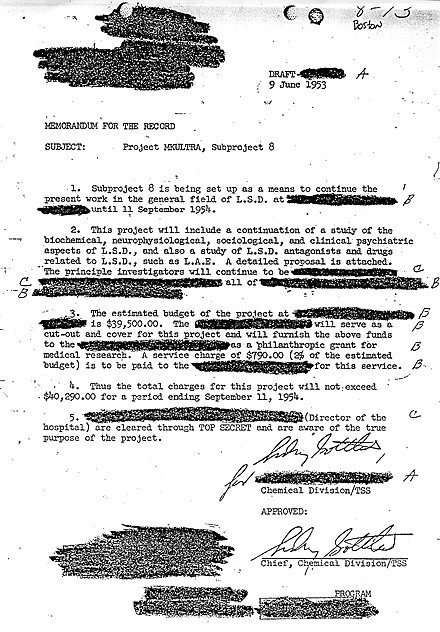
Gottlieb approved Project MKULTRA's "Subproject 8" on LSD in this June 1953 memo. (Redactions obscure much of the context.)

Gottlieb was the liaison to the military subcontractor Lockheed, then working for the CIA on Project AQUATONE, later known as the U-2 spy plane. In 1953, he arranged a safe house for the Lockheed Aeronautics Services Division (LASD) with an easy and exclusive egress.

By 1955 Project MK-ULTRA had outgrown its government funding. At this point Subproject 27 (basic research of LSD) was a funding subproject that combined previous subprojects, including payment to Sandoz Pharmaceuticals for LSD, John Mulholland's The Official CIA Manual of Trickery and Deception (subproject 15 magic support, Mulholland Supplement), and further procurement of LSD (subproject 18), but it grew to almost 150 documented subprojects, including a microwave gun and the search for alternatives to LSD, which led to later programs like Project MKCHICKWIT, most of which focused on South America.

In addition to working with subcontractors, the CIA worked with the Advanced Research Projects Agency (ARPA) of the Department of Defense and the Office of Naval Intelligence, though it is unclear what role Gottlieb played in these affairs other than authorization.

In March 1960, under The Cuban Project, a CIA plan approved by President Eisenhower—and under the direction of CIA Directorate for Plans Richard M. Bissell—Gottlieb proposed spraying Fidel Castro's television studio with LSD and saturating Castro's shoes with thallium to make his beard fall out. Gottlieb also hatched schemes to assassinate Castro, including the use of a poisoned cigar, a poisoned wetsuit, an exploding conch shell, and a poisonous fountain pen. Gottlieb also played a role in the CIA's attempt to assassinate Prime Minister Patrice Lumumba of the Congo. He took a vial of poison to the Congo with plans to place it on Lumumba's toothbrush in the summer of 1960. He provided these "toxic biological materials" to Larry Devlin, the CIA station chief in the Congo, and although Devlin reportedly declined the assignment, a military coup soon overthrew and killed Lumumba.

== Retirement and death ==
Gottlieb retired from the CIA in 1973, saying he did not believe his work had been effective. Visited in retirement by the son of his late colleague Frank Olson, he was residing in Culpeper, Virginia, where he raised goats, ate yogurt, and advocated for peace and environmentalism. He and his wife, Margaret, spent two years traveling in Australia, Africa, and India before settling down for several months to run a leper hospital in India. He had two sons and two daughters.

Gottlieb and his wife moved back to Santa Cruz, California, to be more involved in their young grandchildren's lives. While there, Gottlieb got a master's degree in speech pathology. After five years in California, the couple moved back to Virginia for their retirement years. Both volunteered, with Gottlieb using his new degree to help in middle schools, high schools, and occasionally hospice care facilities as a speech pathologist. The couple also enjoyed farming their own food in their free time.

On March 7, 1999, Gottlieb died at his home in Washington, Virginia. He was reported to have a history of heart problems, but his wife declined to give the cause of death.

== See also ==
- Church Committee
- Grigory Mairanovsky
- Human rights violations by the CIA
- Enhanced interrogation techniques
- Unethical human experimentation
- Unethical human experimentation in the United States
