= MKUltra =

CIA program involving illegal experimentation on human test subjects (1953–1972)

External videos
- Presentation by Stephen Kinzer on Poisoner in Chief, October 3, 2019, C-SPAN

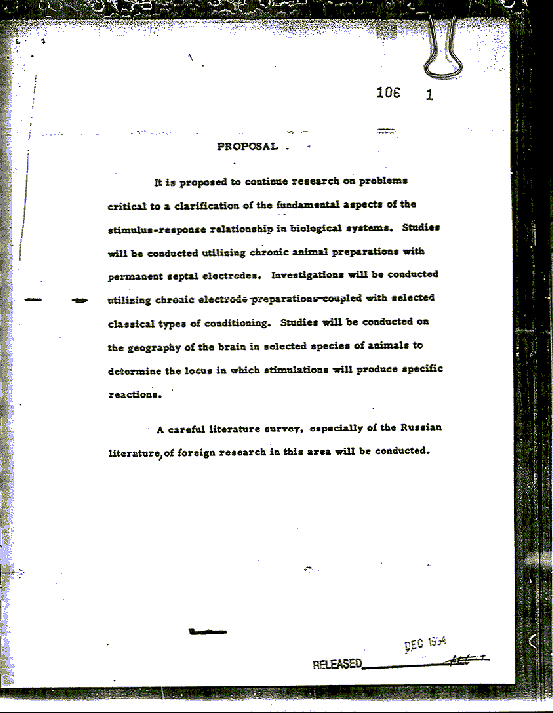
Declassified MKUltra documents

MKUltra (Note: Alternatively spelled in many different ways, such as MKULTRA, MK-Ultra, MK Ultra, Project MKUltra, and more.) was an illegal human experimentation program designed and undertaken by the United States Central Intelligence Agency (CIA) to develop procedures and identify drugs that could be used in altering human behavior. The program has been widely condemned as a violation of individual rights and an example of the CIA's abuse of power, with critics highlighting its disregard for consent and its corrosive impact on democratic principles.

Project MKUltra began in 1953 and was terminated in 1972. MKUltra used numerous methods to manipulate its subjects' mental states and brain functions, such as the covert administration of high doses of psychoactive drugs (especially LSD) and other chemicals without the subjects' consent. Additionally, other methods beyond chemical compounds were used, including electroshocks, hypnosis, sensory deprivation, isolation, verbal and sexual abuse, and other forms of torture.

Project MKUltra was preceded by Project Artichoke. It was organized through the CIA's Office of Scientific Intelligence and coordinated with the United States Army Biological Warfare Laboratories. The program engaged in illegal activities, including the use of U.S. and Canadian citizens as unwitting test subjects. MKUltra's scope was broad, with activities carried out under the guise of research at more than 80 institutions aside from the military, including colleges and universities, hospitals, prisons, and pharmaceutical companies. The CIA operated using front organizations, although some top officials at these institutions were aware of the CIA's involvement.

Project MKUltra was revealed to the public in 1975 by the Church Committee (named after Senator Frank Church) of the United States Congress and Gerald Ford's United States President's Commission on CIA Activities within the United States (the Rockefeller Commission). Investigative efforts were hampered by CIA director Richard Helms's order that all MKUltra files be destroyed in 1973; the Church Committee and Rockefeller Commission investigations relied on the sworn testimony of direct participants and on the small number of documents that survived Helms's order. In 1977, a Freedom of Information Act (FOIA) request uncovered a cache of 20,000 documents relating to MKUltra, which led to Senate hearings. Some surviving information about MKUltra was declassified in 2001.

== Background ==
=== Name ===
The term MKUltra is a CIA cryptonym: "MK" is an arbitrary prefix standing for the Office of Technical Service and "Ultra" is an arbitrary word out of a dictionary used to name the project.

=== Origin of the project ===
During the early 1940s, Nazi scientists working in the concentration camps of Auschwitz and Dachau during World War II conducted interrogation experiments on human subjects. Substances such as barbiturates, morphine derivatives, and hallucinogens such as mescaline were employed in experiments conducted on Polish, Russian, Ukrainian, Jewish, and other prisoners of war. MKUltra experiments intended to develop a truth serum which would, in the words of one laboratory assistant to Dachau scientist Kurt Plötner, "eliminate the will of the person examined." American historian Stephen Kinzer said that the CIA project was a continuation of these earlier Nazi experiments, as evidenced by MKUltra's use of mescaline on unwitting subjects, replicating previous Nazi experiments conducted at Dachau. Numerous Nazi scientists would be employed by the United States government after the war as part of Operation Paperclip, with some figures such as Kurt Blome becoming involved in MKUltra.

American interest in drug-related interrogation experiments began in 1943, when the Office of Strategic Services began developing a "truth drug" that would produce "uninhibited truthfulness" in an interrogated person. In 1947, the United States Navy initiated Project CHATTER, an interrogation program which saw the first testing of LSD on human subjects.

In 1950, the Central Intelligence Agency under the direction of General Walter Bedell Smith initiated a series of interrogation projects involving human subjects, beginning with the launch of Project Bluebird, officially renamed Project Artichoke on August 20, 1951. Directed and overseen by Brigadier General Paul F. Gaynor, the objective of Artichoke was to determine whether an individual could be made to perform an act of attempted assassination involuntarily. Morphine, mescaline and LSD were all administered to unknowing CIA agents in an attempt to produce amnesia in the subjects. In addition, Project Artichoke intended to employ certain viruses such as dengue fever as potential incapacitating agents.

=== Aims and leadership ===
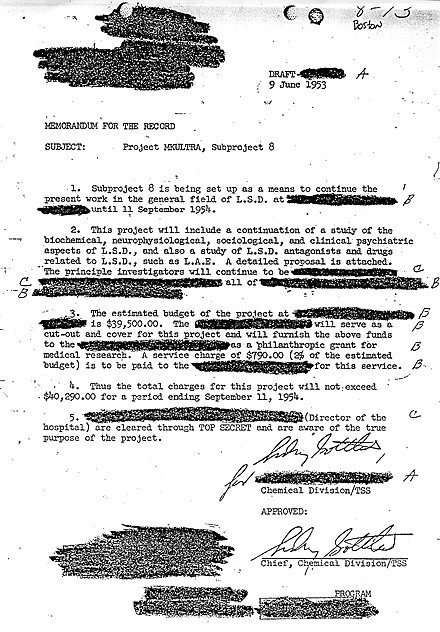
Sidney Gottlieb approved of an MKUltra sub-project on LSD in this June 9, 1953, letter.

The project was led by Sidney Gottlieb, but began on the order of CIA director Allen Dulles on April 13, 1953. Its aim was to develop mind-controlling drugs for use against the Soviet bloc in response to alleged Soviet, Chinese, and North Korean use of mind control techniques on U.S. prisoners of war during the Korean War. The CIA wanted to use similar methods on their own captives, and was interested in manipulating foreign leaders with such techniques, devising several schemes to drug Fidel Castro. The CIA often conducted experiments without the subjects' knowledge or consent. In some cases, academic researchers were funded through grants from CIA front organizations but were unaware that the CIA was using their work for these purposes.

The project attempted to produce a perfect truth serum for interrogating suspected Soviet spies during the Cold War and to explore other possibilities of mind control. Subproject 54 was the Navy's top-secret "Perfect Concussion" program, which was supposed to use sub-aural frequency blasts to erase memory; the program was never carried out to the knowledge of the public.

Most MKUltra records were destroyed in 1973 by order of CIA director Richard Helms, so investigators have been unable to gain a complete understanding of the more than 150 funded research subprojects sponsored by MKUltra and related CIA programs.

MKUltra began during a period of what English journalist Rupert Cornwell described as "paranoia" at the CIA, when the U.S. had lost its nuclear monopoly and fear of communism was at its worst. CIA counter-intelligence chief James Jesus Angleton believed that a mole had infiltrated the organization at a high level of clearance. The agency spent millions of dollars on studies to examine ways to influence and control the mind, and enhance its ability to extract information from resistant subjects during interrogation. Some historians assert that one goal of MKUltra — and related CIA projects — was to create a Manchurian Candidate–style subject. American historian Alfred W. McCoy has claimed that the CIA attempted to focus media attention on these sorts of "ridiculous" programs so that the public would not look at the research's primary goal, which was effective methods of interrogation.

=== Applications ===
The 1976 Church Committee report found that, in the MKDELTA program, "Drugs were used primarily as an aid to interrogations, but MKULTRA/MKDELTA materials were also used for harassment, discrediting or disabling purposes."

=== Other related projects ===
In 1964, MKSEARCH was the name given to the continuation of the MKULTRA program. The MKSEARCH program was divided into two projects dubbed MKOFTEN and MKCHICKWIT. Funding for MKSEARCH commenced in 1965 and ended in 1971. The project was a joint project between the U.S. Army Chemical Corps and the CIA's Office of Research and Development to find new offensive-use agents, with a focus on incapacitating agents. Its purpose was to develop, test, and evaluate capabilities in the covert use of biological, chemical, and radioactive material systems and techniques of producing predictable human behavioral and/or physiological changes in support of highly sensitive operational requirements.

By March 1971, over 26,000 potential agents had been acquired for future screening. The CIA was interested in bird migration patterns for chemical and biological warfare (CBW) research; subproject 139 designated "Bird Disease Studies" at Pennsylvania State University. MKOFTEN was to deal with testing and toxicological transmissivity and behavioral effects of drugs in animals and, ultimately, humans. MKCHICKWIT was concerned with acquiring information on new drug developments in Europe and Asia, and with acquiring samples.

In January 1957, the CIA started a subproject of MKUltra in an effort to broaden its scientific research. "Subproject 68", conducted at the Allan Memorial Institute in Montreal under the direction of psychiatrist Dr. Donald Ewen Cameron, represents one of the most infamous and ethically controversial endeavors within the MKUltra program. This subproject aimed to explore innovative techniques for manipulating and controlling human behavior, particularly through the methods of "psychic driving" and "depatterning". Psychic driving involved subjecting patients to continuous playback of recorded messages, often with themes of self-improvement or identity reinforcement, while they were under the influence of powerful psychoactive substances such as LSD or barbiturates.

== Experiments on Americans ==
CIA documents suggest that they investigated "chemical, biological, and radiological" methods of mind control as part of MKUltra. They spent an estimated $10 million or more, roughly $87.5 million adjusted for inflation.

During a hearing by the Senate Health Subcommittee, a testimony by the deputy director of the CIA stated that over 30 institutions and universities were involved in the experimentation program of testing drugs on unknowing citizens "at all social levels, high and low, native Americans and foreign." Several of these tests involved the issuing of LSD to unaware subjects in social situations.

The Army was subject to the testing of LSD, which occurred in three phases. The first phase included over 1,000 American soldiers who willingly volunteered for testing of chemical warfare experiments. Phase two had 96 volunteers who were dosed with LSD in the evaluation of the possibility of intelligence uses of the drug. The third phase included Project Third Chance and Project Derby Hat, which conducted experiments on 16 unwitting nonvolunteer subjects that, after receiving LSD, were interrogated as part of operation field tests.

After retiring in 1972, Gottlieb dismissed his entire effort for the CIA's MKUltra program as useless. Files discovered in 1977 containing 700 pages of new information showed that experiments had continued until Gottlieb ordered the program halted on July 10, 1972.

=== LSD ===
In 1938, LSD was isolated by Albert Hofmann at the Sandoz Laboratories in Basel, Switzerland. The early directors of MKUltra became aware of the existence of LSD and sought to use it for "mind-control". In the early 1950s, MKUltra director Sidney Gottlieb arranged for the CIA to buy the world's entire supply of LSD for $240,000, which in 2024 would be $4,227,079. This LSD supply gave Gottlieb the ability to fulfill his experiment by spreading LSD to prisons, hospitals, institutions, clinics, and foundations to see how citizens would react to the drug without knowing exactly what was happening to them.

Early CIA efforts focused on LSD-25, which later came to dominate many of MKUltra's programs. The CIA wanted to know if they could make Soviet spies defect against their will and whether the Soviets could do the same to the CIA's own operatives.

Documents obtained from the CIA by John D. Marks under FOIA in 1976 showed that, in 1953, the CIA considered purchasing 10 kilograms of LSD, enough for 100 million doses. The proposed purchase aimed to stop other countries from controlling the supply. The documents showed that the CIA purchased some quantities of LSD from Sandoz Laboratories in Switzerland.

Once Project MKUltra started, in April 1953, experiments included administering LSD to mental patients, prisoners, drug addicts, and prostitutes – "people who could not fight back", as one agency officer put it. In one case, they administered LSD to a mental patient in Kentucky for 174 days. They also administered LSD to CIA employees, military personnel, doctors, other government agents, and members of the general public to study their reactions. The aim was to find drugs that would bring out deep confessions or wipe a subject's mind clean and program them as "a robot agent". Military personnel who received the mind-altering drugs were also threatened with court-martial if they told anyone about the experiments. LSD and other drugs were often administered without the subject's knowledge or informed consent, a violation of the Nuremberg Code the U.S. had agreed to follow after World War II. Many veterans who were subjected to experimentation later sought legal and monetary reparations.

In Operation Midnight Climax, the CIA set up several brothels within agency safehouses in San Francisco to obtain a selection of men who would be too embarrassed to talk about the events. The men were dosed with LSD, the brothels were equipped with one-way mirrors, and the sessions were filmed for later viewing and study. In other experiments where people were given LSD without their knowledge, they were interrogated under bright lights with doctors in the background taking notes. They told subjects they would extend their "trips" if they refused to reveal their secrets. The people subjected to these interrogations were CIA employees, U.S. military personnel, and agents suspected of working for the Soviet Bloc during the Cold War. Long-term debilitation and several deaths resulted from this. Heroin addicts were bribed into taking LSD with offers of more heroin.

At the invitation of Stanford psychology graduate student Vik Lovell, an acquaintance of Allen Ginsberg, Ken Kesey, volunteered to take part in what turned out to be a CIA-financed study under the aegis of MKUltra, at the Menlo Park Veterans' Hospital where he worked as a night aide. The project studied the effects of hallucinogens and other psychoactive drugs, particularly LSD, psilocybin, mescaline, cocaine, AMT, and DMT on people.

The Office of Security used LSD in interrogations, but Sidney Gottlieb, the chemist who directed MKUltra, had other ideas: he thought it could be used in covert operations. Since its effects were temporary, he believed it could be given to high-ranking officials and, in this way, affect the course of important meetings, speeches, etc. Since he realized there was a difference in testing the drug in a laboratory and using it in clandestine operations, he initiated a series of experiments where LSD was given to people in "normal" settings without warning. At first, everyone in Technical Services tried it; a typical experiment involved two people in a room where they observed each other for hours and took notes. As the experimentation progressed, a point arrived where outsiders were drugged with no explanation whatsoever, and surprise acid trips became something of an occupational hazard among CIA operatives. Adverse reactions often occurred, such as an operative who received the drug in his morning coffee, became psychotic and ran across Washington, D.C., seeing a monster in every car passing him. The experiments continued even after Frank Olson, an army chemist who had never taken LSD, was covertly dosed by his CIA supervisor and nine days later plunged to his death from the window of a 13th-story New York City hotel room, supposedly as a result of deep depression induced by the drug. According to Stephen Kinzer, Olson had approached his superiors some time earlier, doubting the morality of the project, and asked to resign from the CIA.

Some subjects' participation was consensual, and in these cases, they appeared to be singled out for even more extreme experiments. In one case, seven drug-addicted African-American participants at the National Institute of Mental Health Addiction Research Center in Kentucky were given LSD for 77 consecutive days.

MKUltra's researchers later dismissed LSD as too unpredictable in its results. They gave up on the notion that LSD was "the secret that was going to unlock the universe", but it still had a place in the cloak-and-dagger arsenal. However, by 1962, the CIA and the army developed a series of super-hallucinogens such as the highly touted BZ, which was thought to hold greater promise as a mind control weapon. This resulted in the withdrawal of support by many academics and private researchers, and LSD research became less of a priority altogether.

=== Other drugs ===
Another technique investigated was the intravenous administration of a barbiturate into one arm and an amphetamine into the other. The barbiturates were released into the person first, and as soon as the person began to fall asleep, the amphetamines were released. Other experiments involved heroin, morphine, temazepam (used under code name MKSEARCH), mescaline, psilocybin, scopolamine, alcohol and sodium pentothal.

A 1955 MKUltra document details research objectives to identify drugs that could be used as cognitive enhancers, disease mimetics, euphoriants "without letdown," and agents to diminish ambition, among other uses. The extent of testing toward these objectives is unclear, given the deliberate destruction of most drug-related MKUltra files in 1973.

=== Hypnosis ===
Declassified MKUltra documents indicate they studied hypnosis in the early 1950s. Experimental goals included creating "hypnotically induced anxieties", "hypnotically increasing ability to learn and recall complex written matter", studying hypnosis and polygraph examinations, "hypnotically increasing ability to observe and recall complex arrangements of physical objects", and studying "relationship of personality to susceptibility to hypnosis". They conducted experiments with drug-induced hypnosis and with anterograde and retrograde amnesia while under the influence of such drugs.

== Experiments on Canadians ==
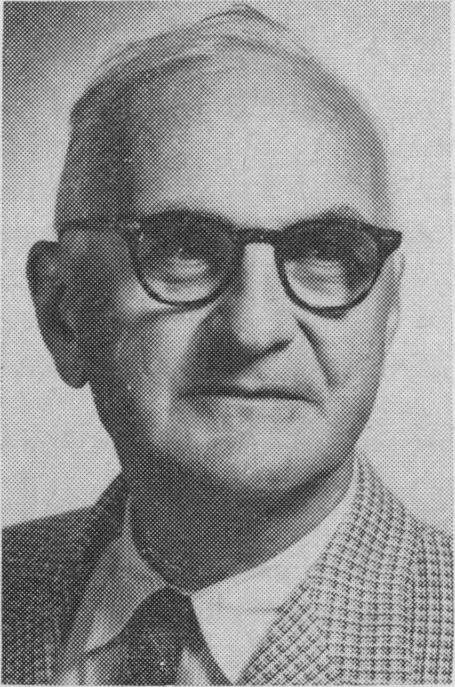
Donald Ewen Cameron, c. 1967

The CIA exported experiments to Canada when they recruited Scottish psychiatrist Donald Ewen Cameron, creator of the "psychic driving" concept, which the CIA found interesting. Cameron had been hoping to correct schizophrenia by erasing existing memories and reprogramming the psyche. He commuted from Albany, New York to Montreal every week to work at the Allan Memorial Institute of McGill University, and was paid $69,000 from 1957 to 1964 (US$766,936 in 2024, adjusted for inflation) to carry out MKUltra experiments there. The Montreal experiments research funds were sent to Cameron by a CIA front organization, the Society for the Investigation of Human Ecology, and as shown in internal CIA documents, Cameron supposedly did not know the money came from the CIA.

In addition to LSD, Cameron also experimented with various paralytic drugs as well as electroconvulsive therapy at thirty to forty times the normal power. His "driving" experiments consisted of putting subjects into drug-induced comas for weeks at a time (up to three months in one case) while playing tape loops of noise or simple repetitive statements. His experiments were often carried out on patients who entered the institute for common problems such as anxiety disorders and postpartum depression, many of whom suffered permanent effects from his actions. His treatments resulted in victims' urinary incontinence, amnesia, forgetting how to talk, forgetting their parents, and thinking their interrogators were their parents.

During this era, Cameron became known worldwide as the first chairman of the World Psychiatric Association as well as president of both the American Psychiatric Association and the Canadian Psychiatric Association. Cameron was also a member of the Nuremberg medical tribunal in 1946–1947.

=== Motivation and assessments ===
His work was inspired and paralleled by the British psychiatrist William Sargant at St Thomas' Hospital, London, and Belmont Hospital, Sutton, who experimented on his patients without their consent, causing similar long-term damage. Although Sargant acted as a consultant for MI5, no evidence has emerged that his work with deep sleep treatment at St Thomas' hospital had any links with intelligence services.

In the 1980s, several of Cameron's former patients sued the CIA for damages, which the Canadian news program The Fifth Estate documented. Their experiences and lawsuit were adapted in the 1998 television miniseries The Sleep Room.

Naomi Klein argues in her book The Shock Doctrine that Cameron's research and his contribution to the MKUltra project was not about mind control and brainwashing, but about designing "a scientifically based system for extracting information from 'resistant sources'. In other words, torture."

Alfred W. McCoy writes, "Stripped of its bizarre excesses, Dr. Cameron's experiments, building upon Donald O. Hebb's earlier breakthrough, laid the scientific foundation for the CIA's two-stage psychological torture method", referring to first creating a state of disorientation in the subject, and then creating a situation of "self-inflicted" discomfort in which the disoriented subject can alleviate pain by capitulating.

== Secret detention camps ==
In areas under American control in the early 1950s in Europe and East Asia, mostly Japan, West Germany, and the Philippines, the CIA created secret detention centers (black sites) so that the U.S. could avoid criminal prosecution. The CIA captured people suspected of being enemy agents and other people it deemed "expendable" to undergo various types of torture and human experimentation. The prisoners were interrogated while being administered psychoactive drugs, electroshocked, and subjected to extremes of temperature, sensory isolation, and the like to develop a better understanding of how to destroy and to control human minds.

== Project Bluebird ==
In October 1950, during the Korean War, North Korean POWs under U.S. custody were reportedly subjected to experiments under Project Bluebird, a precursor to MK-ULTRA. According to declassified documents released by the National Security Archive in 2024–2025, these experiments involved the use of various drugs and advanced interrogation techniques, with the stated aim of "controlling an individual to the point where he will do our bidding against his will and even against such fundamental laws of nature as self-preservation".

== Revelation ==
In 1973, amid a government-wide panic caused by the Watergate scandal, CIA Director Richard Helms ordered all MKUltra files destroyed. Pursuant to this order, most CIA documents regarding the project were destroyed, making a full investigation of MKUltra impossible. A cache of some 20,000 documents survived Helms's purge, as they had been incorrectly stored in a financial records building and were discovered following a FOIA request in 1977. These documents were fully investigated during the Senate Hearings of 1977.

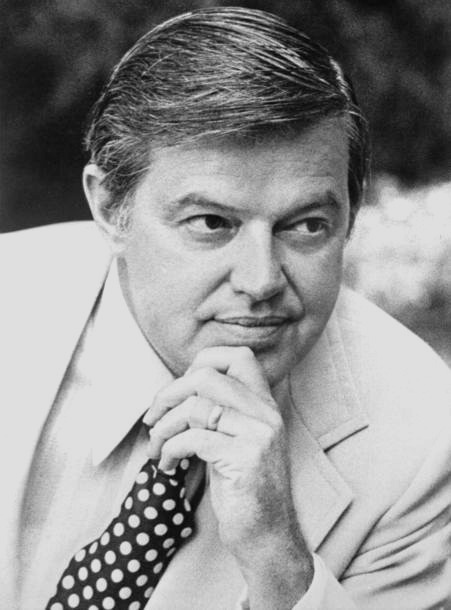
Frank Church headed the Church Committee, an investigation into the practices of the U.S. intelligence agencies.

In December 1974, The New York Times alleged that the CIA had conducted illegal domestic activities, including experiments on U.S. citizens, during the 1960s. That report prompted investigations by the United States Congress, in the form of the Church Committee, and by a commission known as the Rockefeller Commission that looked into the illegal domestic activities of the CIA, the FBI and intelligence-related agencies of the military.

In the summer of 1975, congressional Church Committee reports and the presidential Rockefeller Commission report revealed to the public for the first time that the CIA and the Department of Defense had conducted experiments on both unwitting and cognizant human subjects as part of an extensive program to find out how to influence and control human behavior through the use of psychoactive drugs such as LSD and mescaline and other chemical, biological, and psychological means. They also revealed that at least one subject, Frank Olson, had died after administration of LSD. Much of what the Church Committee and the Rockefeller Commission learned about MKUltra was contained in a report, prepared by the Inspector General's office in 1963, that had survived the destruction of records ordered in 1973. However, it contained little detail. Sidney Gottlieb, who had retired from the CIA two years previously and had headed MKUltra, was interviewed by the committee but claimed to have very little recollection of the activities of MKUltra.

The congressional committee investigating the CIA research, chaired by Senator Frank Church, concluded that "prior consent was obviously not obtained from any of the subjects." The committee noted that the "experiments sponsored by these researchers [...] call into question the decision by the agencies not to fix guidelines for experiments."

Following the recommendations of the Church Committee, President Gerald Ford in 1976 issued the first Executive Order on Intelligence Activities, which, among other things, prohibited "experimentation with drugs on human subjects, except with the informed consent, in writing and witnessed by a disinterested party, of each such human subject" and in accordance with the guidelines issued by the National Commission. Subsequent orders by Presidents Carter and Reagan expanded the directive to apply to any human experimentation.

1977 United States Senate report on MKUltra

In 1977, during a hearing held by the Senate Select Committee on Intelligence, to look further into MKUltra, Admiral Stansfield Turner, then Director of Central Intelligence, revealed that the CIA had found a set of records, consisting of about 20,000 pages, that had survived the 1973 destruction orders because they had been incorrectly stored at a records center not usually used for such documents. These files dealt with the financing of MKUltra projects and contained few project details, but much more was learned from them than from the Inspector General's 1963 report.

On the Senate floor in 1977, Senator Ted Kennedy said:

The Deputy Director of the CIA revealed that over thirty universities and institutions were involved in an "extensive testing and experimentation" program which included covert drug tests on unwitting citizens "at all social levels, high and low, native Americans and foreign." Several of these tests involved the administration of LSD to "unwitting subjects in social situations."

At least one death, the result of the alleged defenestration of Frank Olson, was attributed to Olson's being subjected, without his knowledge, to such experimentation nine days before his death. The CIA itself subsequently acknowledged that these tests had little scientific rationale. The officers conducting the monitoring were not qualified scientific observers.

In Canada, the issue took much longer to surface, becoming widely known in 1984 on a CBC news show, The Fifth Estate. It was learned that not only had the CIA funded Cameron's efforts, but also that the Canadian government was aware of this and had later provided another $500,000 in funding to continue the experiments. This revelation largely derailed efforts by the victims to sue the CIA, as their U.S. counterparts had, and the Canadian government eventually settled out of court for $100,000 to each of the 127 victims. Cameron died on September 8, 1967, after suffering a heart attack while he and his son were mountain climbing. None of Cameron's personal records of his involvement with MKUltra survived because his family destroyed them after his death. A 1986 report found that Canadian government officials were not fully aware of Cameron's experiments.

=== 1994 U.S. General Accounting Office report ===
The U.S. General Accounting Office issued a report on September 28, 1994, which stated that between 1940 and 1974, the Department of Defense and other national security agencies tested hazardous substances and radiation on hundreds of thousands of human subjects.

Based on this report and other sources, the Senate Committee on Veterans' Affairs concluded:

Working with the CIA, the Department of Defense gave hallucinogenic drugs to thousands of "volunteer" soldiers in the 1950s and 1960s. In addition to LSD, the Army also tested quinuclidinyl benzilate, a hallucinogen code-named BZ. Many of these tests were conducted under the so-called MKULTRA program, established to counter perceived Soviet and Chinese advances in brainwashing techniques. Between 1953 and 1964, the program consisted of 149 projects involving drug testing and other studies on unwitting human subjects.

=== CIA vs Sims ===
In CIA v. Sims (1985), the U.S. Supreme Court endorsed the mosaic effect to justify broad judicial deference under FOIA Exemption 3, allowing the CIA to withhold seemingly innocuous details about MKUltra because aggregated disclosures could expose intelligence sources. This rationale has since granted the agency near-total immunity from FOIA and has been broadly applied by lower courts.

== Death of Frank Olson ==
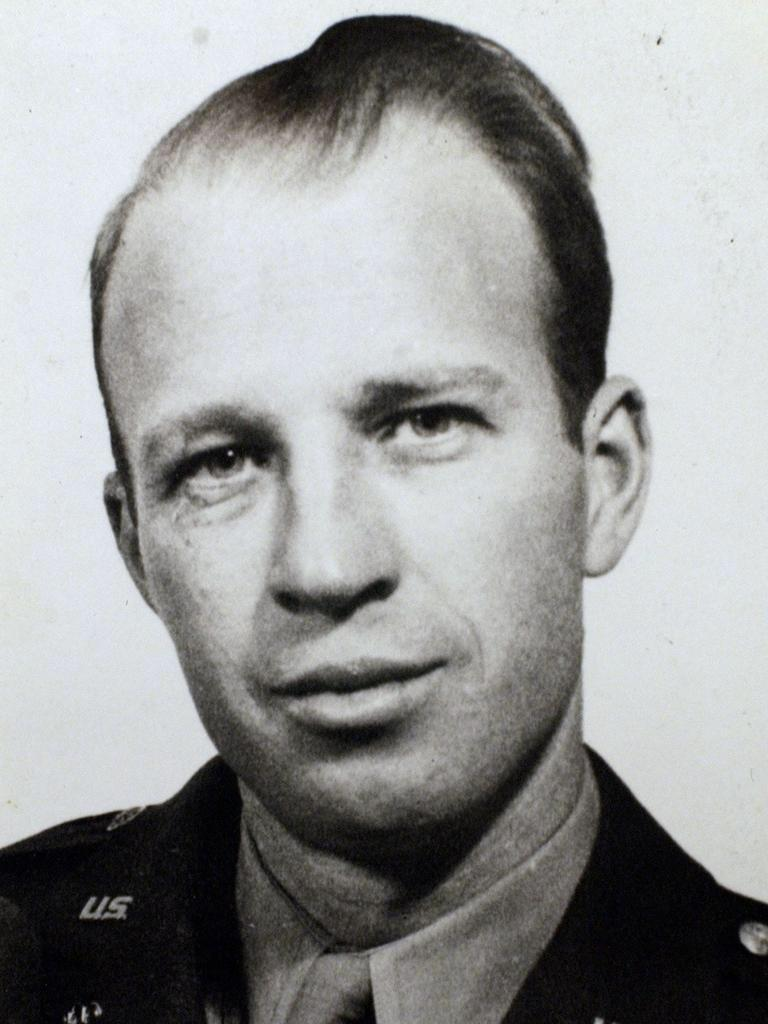
Frank Olson in 1953

Several known deaths have been associated with Project MKUltra, most notably that of Frank Olson. By 1951, Olson was a United States Army biochemist and biological weapons researcher.

In 1953, a few days before his death, Frank Olson quit his position as acting chief of the Special Operations Division at Detrick, Maryland (later Fort Detrick) because of a severe moral crisis concerning the nature of his biological weapons research.

According to his family, some of Olson's concerns were:

- the development of assassination materials used by the CIA
- the CIA's use of biological warfare materials in covert operations
- experimentation with biological weapons in populated areas
- collaboration with former Nazi scientists under Operation Paperclip
- LSD mind control research
- the use of psychoactive drugs during "terminal" interrogations under a program code-named Project Artichoke

In November 1953, Olson was given LSD without his knowledge or consent as part of a CIA experiment, and died after falling from a 13th-story window a week later. A CIA doctor assigned to monitor Olson claimed to have been asleep in another bed in a New York City hotel room when Olson fell to his death. In 1953, Olson's death was described as a suicide that had occurred during a severe psychotic episode. The CIA's own internal investigation concluded that the head of MKUltra, CIA chemist Sidney Gottlieb, had conducted the LSD experiment with Olson's prior knowledge, although neither Olson nor the other men taking part in the experiment were informed as to the exact nature of the drug until some 20 minutes after its ingestion. The report further suggested that Gottlieb was nonetheless due a reprimand, as he had failed to take into account Olson's already-diagnosed suicidal tendencies, which might have been exacerbated by the LSD.

In 1975, Olson's family received a $750,000 ($4,487,477 in 2026, adjusted for inflation) settlement from the U.S. government and formal apologies from President Gerald Ford and CIA Director William Colby, though their apologies were limited to informed consent issues concerning Olson's ingestion of LSD.

In 1977, the Senate Select Committee on Intelligence and the Committee on Human Resources wrote:

Given the CIA's purposeful destruction of most records, its failure to follow informed consent protocols with thousands of participants, the uncontrolled nature of the experiments, and the lack of follow-up data, the full impact of MKUltra experiments, including deaths, may never be known.

In 1994, Olson's body was exhumed, and cranial injuries indicated that Olson had been knocked unconscious before he exited the window. This means the forensic evidence conflicted with the former official version of events by the CIA. The medical examiner termed Olson's death a "homicide".

Since 2001 (or earlier), the Olson family disputes the official version of events. They maintain that Frank Olson was murdered because, especially in the aftermath of his LSD experience, he had become a security risk who might divulge state secrets associated with highly classified CIA programs, about many of which he had direct personal knowledge.

The 2009 book A Terrible Mistake by investigative journalist Hank Albarelli alleged that Olson and the CIA was involved in the 1951 Pont-Saint-Esprit mass poisoning. Albarelli said the motive for Olson's murder was that he wanted to leave the CIA and had begun talking about the MKULTRA experiments, including the 1951 Pont-Saint-Esprit mass poisoning.

On November 28, 2012, the Olson family filed suit against the U.S. federal government for the wrongful death of Frank Olson. In 2013 (July) the case was dismissed, due in part to the 1976 settlement between the family and government.

In the decision dismissing the suit, U.S. District Judge James Boasberg wrote,

While the court must limit its analysis to the four corners of the complaint, the skeptical reader may wish to know that the public record supports many of the allegations [in the family's suit], far-fetched as they may sound.

== Legal issues involving informed consent ==
The revelations about the CIA and the Army prompted many subjects or their survivors to file lawsuits against the federal government for conducting experiments without informed consent. Although the government aggressively, and sometimes successfully, sought to avoid legal liability, several plaintiffs did receive compensation through court order, out-of-court settlement, or acts of Congress. Frank Olson's family received $750,000 by a special act of Congress, and both President Ford and CIA director William Colby met with Olson's family to apologize publicly.

Previously, the CIA and the Army had actively and successfully sought to withhold incriminating information, even as they secretly provided compensation to the families. One subject of army drug experimentation, James Stanley, an army sergeant, brought an important, albeit unsuccessful, suit. The government argued that Stanley was barred from suing under the Feres doctrine.

In 1987, the Supreme Court affirmed this defense in a 5–4 decision that dismissed Stanley's case: United States v. Stanley. The majority argued that "a test for liability that depends on the extent to which particular suits would call into question military discipline and decision making would itself require judicial inquiry into, and hence intrusion upon, military matters." In dissent, Justice William Brennan argued that the need to preserve military discipline should not protect the government from liability and punishment for serious violations of constitutional rights:

The medical trials at Nuremberg in 1947 deeply impressed upon the world that experimentation with unknowing human subjects is morally and legally unacceptable. The United States Military Tribunal established the Nuremberg Code as a standard against which to judge German scientists who experimented with human subjects... [I]n defiance of this principle, military intelligence officials [...] began surreptitiously testing chemical and biological materials, including LSD.

Justice Sandra Day O'Connor, writing a separate dissent, stated:

No judicially crafted rule should insulate from liability the involuntary and unknowing human experimentation alleged to have occurred in this case. Indeed, as Justice Brennan observes, the United States played an instrumental role in the criminal prosecution of Nazi officials who experimented with human subjects during the Second World War, and the standards that the Nuremberg Military Tribunals developed to judge the behavior of the defendants stated that the 'voluntary consent of the human subject is absolutely essential [...] to satisfy moral, ethical, and legal concepts.' If this principle is violated, the very least that society can do is to see that the victims are compensated, as best they can be, by the perpetrators.

In another lawsuit, Wayne Ritchie, a former United States Marshal, after hearing about the project's existence in 1990, alleged the CIA laced his food or drink with LSD at a 1957 Christmas party, which resulted in his attempting to commit a robbery at a bar and his subsequent arrest. While the government admitted it was, at that time, drugging people without their consent and that Ritchie's behavior was typical of someone on LSD, U.S. District Judge Marilyn Hall Patel found Ritchie could not prove he was one of MKUltra's victims or that LSD caused his robbery attempt, and dismissed the case in 2005.

In Canada, a class action lawsuit on the Montreal experiments has been authorized by the Quebec Superior court in 2025, granting representation status to a survivor – admitted at the Allan Memorial Institute at age 15 – and a family member of a deceased patient.

== Notable people ==
=== Documented experimenters ===
Confirmed experimenters:

- Carl Rogers
- John Gittinger, creator of the Personality Assessment System
- Harold Alexander Abramson
- Donald Ewen Cameron
- Sidney Gottlieb
- Harris Isbell
- Martin Theodore Orne
- Louis Jolyon West
- Harry Harlow
- Edgar Schein
- George Hunter White

Alleged experimenters:

- Jim Jones
- Charlie Siragusa

=== Documented subjects ===
Confirmed subjects:

- Allen Ginsberg first took LSD in an experiment on Stanford University's campus, where he could listen to records of his choice (he chose a Gertrude Stein reading, a Tibetan mandala mantra, and Richard Wagner). He said the experience resulted in "a slight paranoia that hung on all my acid experiences through the mid-1960s until I learned from meditation how to disperse that." He became an outspoken advocate for psychedelics in the 1960s and, after hearing suspicions that the experiment was CIA-funded, wrote, "Am I, Allen Ginsberg, the product of one of the CIA's lamentable, ill-advised, or triumphantly successful experiments in mind control?"
- Ken Kesey, author of One Flew Over the Cuckoo's Nest, is said to have volunteered for MKUltra experiments involving LSD and other psychedelic drugs at the Veterans Administration Hospital in Menlo Park while he was a student at nearby Stanford University. Kesey's experiences while under the influence of LSD inspired him to promote the drug outside the context of the MKUltra experiments, which influenced the early development of hippie culture.
- Harold Blauer was an American tennis player who died from injections of 3,4-Methylenedioxyamphetamine in the New York State Psychiatric Institute, which he had voluntarily checked into due to his depression following a divorce.
- Robert Hunter was an American lyricist, singer-songwriter, translator, and poet, best known for his association with Jerry Garcia and the Grateful Dead. Along with Ken Kesey, Hunter was said to be an early volunteer MKUltra test subject at Stanford University. Stanford test subjects were paid to take LSD, psilocybin, and mescaline, then report on their experiences. These experiences were creatively formative for Hunter:

Sit back picture yourself swooping up a shell of purple with foam crests of crystal drops soft nigh they fall unto the sea of morning creep-very-softly mist [...] and then sort of cascade tinkley-bell-like (must I take you by the hand, ever so slowly type) and then conglomerate suddenly into a peal of silver vibrant uncomprehendingly, blood singingly, joyously resounding bells [...] By my faith if this be insanity, then for the love of God permit me to remain insane.

Alleged subjects:

- James "Whitey" Bulger, an organized crime boss, alleged he had been subjected to weekly injections of LSD and subsequent testing while in prison in Atlanta in 1957.
- Ted Kaczynski, an American domestic terrorist known as the Unabomber, was said to be a subject of a voluntary psychological study alleged by some sources to have been a part of MKUltra. As a sophomore at Harvard, Kaczynski participated in a study described by author Alston Chase as a "purposely brutalizing psychological experiment", led by Harvard psychologist Henry Murray. In total, Kaczynski spent 200 hours as part of the study.
- Sirhan Sirhan's attorney, Lawrence Teeter, believed that Sirhan was "operating under MKUltra mind control techniques" when he assassinated Robert F. Kennedy.
- Charles Manson has been tied to MKUltra by author Tom O'Neill, beginning with his time in prison, when Manson took part in drug-induced psychological experiments run by the federal government. Such experiments hypothetically could have been continued through his ongoing connection to the Haight Ashbury Free Clinic in San Francisco once out of prison in 1967. The The Washington Post and Los Angeles Times described O'Neil claims "speculative" and "conspiratorial".
- Jimmy Shaver, convicted killer and rapist.

== In popular culture ==
MKUltra plays a part in many conspiracy theories due to its nature and to the destruction of most records concerning it. This has also led to the idea that the human experiments performed by the CIA are ongoing in the present day.

- The sixth and final volume of John Burdett's Bangkok detective novel series (2003–2015), The Bangkok Asset, features MKUltra as a major theme. The novel expands the impacts of the program to ultimately include the creation of super soldier-spies with "transhuman abilities".
- The 2009 film The Killing Room is a thriller based on the real life MKUltra top secret government psychological program in which various volunteer test subjects are put in a tense situation.
- The seventh track on the Muse album The Resistance, "MK Ultra", is about project MKUltra.
- The BYU television series Granite Flats (2013–2015) was based on the CIA's implementation of an MKUltra experiment on one of the series's characters, Lt. Frank Quincy (Scott Christopher), in an attempt to transform him into a conscienceless assassin.
- Screenrant writer Kara Hedash wrote that plot points in the Netflix series Stranger Things (2016–2025) were inspired by MKUltra experiments.
- Wormwood is a 2017 American six-part docudrama miniseries directed by Errol Morris and released on Netflix. The series is based on the life of the scientist Frank Olson and his involvement in Project MKUltra.
- Will Wood's 2020 album The Normal Album features a song titled "BlackBoxWarrior – OKULTRA", which describes the experience of an MKUltra victim among other themes.
- The Outlast Trials is a video game made in 2024 is a game based off of the MKUltra taking place in 1959, where you play as a reagent who goes through (therapy) and the point is to brainwash your character and make him a devoted ruthless killer in the cold war to help america.

== See also ==
United States

- CIA activities in the United States
- Unethical human experimentation in the United States

International

- Allegations of CIA drug trafficking
- Human radiation experiments – Studies of radiation effects on humans
- Human rights violations by the CIA
- Poison laboratory of the Soviet secret services – Secret research facility in the Soviet Union
- Unit 731 – Japanese biological and chemical warfare unit (1936–1945)

Other

- Montauk Project – UFO conspiracy theory
