= Office of Technical Service =

CIA organization

Coordinates: 38°57′06″N 77°08′48″W

The Office of Technical Service (OTS; formerly known as the Technical Services Division (TSD) and Technical Services Staff (TSS)) is a component of the U.S. Central Intelligence Agency (CIA), responsible for supporting CIA's clandestine operations with gadgets, disguises, forgeries, secret writings, and weapons. The OTS traces its history to October 1942, when OSS director William J. Donovan created the OSS Research and Development Branch, a technical group tasked with creating "dirty tricks and deadly weapons" to combat the US's World War II enemies. Donovan named Cornell University-trained chemist and executive Stanley Platt Lovell as the branch's first head, a man whom the CIA remembers as the "founding father" of the OTS. In the 1950s and early 1960s, it also researched, investigated, and experimented with the use of drugs, chemicals, hypnosis, and isolation to extract information during interrogation, as well as to make it easier for American captives to resist interrogation. OTS is part of the CIA's Directorate of Science and Technology.

Many film makers have been inspired by OTS, although the information around it is kept highly secret, with only dated projects being revealed and much of it left up to interpretation.

== See also ==
- Canadian Caper
  - Tony Mendez
- CIA cryptonym
- Project MKULTRA
  - Sidney Gottlieb
- United States biological weapons program
  - Frank Olson
- Jonna Mendez
- Allen Dulles
