= James Robert Thornwell =

American soldier used in LSD experiments

Personal details
- Born: James Robert Earles; August 30, 1937 Spartanburg, South Carolina, U.S.
- Died: June 25, 1984 (aged 46) Vallejo, California, U.S.
- Children: 2

Military service
- Allegiance: United States
- Branch/service: United States Army
- Years of service: 1958–1961
- Rank: Private

James Robert Thornwell (born James Robert Earles; August 30, 1937 – June 25, 1984) was a United States Army soldier who gained national attention in 1977 after it was revealed that in 1961, as part of an interrogation, he had been unwittingly administered LSD by Army intelligence. Though it is estimated that thousands of US persons took part in Army-funded drug testing programs, many of which involved covert administration of LSD, Thornwell is thought to be the only US soldier interrogated under the influence of LSD.

While stationed in France and working as a communications clerk with the Army, Thornwell was accused of stealing classified documents As a result, he spent three months in Army detention where he was subjected to a number of unorthodox and abusive interrogation techniques, including, by the Army's own words “…sustained interrogation, deprivation of food, drink, sleep or bodily evacuation, sustained isolation, verbal degradation, and bodily discomfort, dramatized threats to subject’s life.” Thornwell was also given drugs, including sodium pentathol, wittingly, and LSD, unwittingly.

These interrogations were conducted under a covert experimental program known as Project Third Chance. As a result of how he was treated during this period of time, Thornwell began to suffer from a number of physical and psychological ailments, and because of this, he was discharged from the Army without ever being formally charged with a crime. Thornwell's suffering and instability remained significant after his discharge, resulting in him having difficulty forming thoughts, controlling his behavior, holding a job, and maintaining relationships.

When, in 1977, Thornwell learned that in the course of this interrogation he had been unwittingly used as a medical test subject, that he had been given LSD, and that the government had been withholding this information from him and failing to provide appropriate follow up care, he sued the United States government for damages. Ultimately, through an act of Congress, Thornwell reached a settlement wherein he accepted $625,000 in compensation. However, 3 1/2 years later, on June 25, 1984, Thornwell was found dead in a pool in Vallejo, California. The family was told that Thornwell likely suffered an epileptic seizure while swimming, and drowned.

== Early life ==
James Thornwwell was born on August 30, 1937, in Spartanburg, South Carolina to Thurn and Ruth Earles. Thurn Earles worked as a truckdriver. Thornwell was an active and popular high school student, describing himself as active in "the drama club, the French club, I was the troop leader for the boy scouts, I was a member of the 4-H club, I won a public speaking contest… I got to go to Washington, D.C. which was quite an accomplishment for me because I was a stutterer…" He was voted most popular in his graduating class. He had earned a four-year college scholarship which he started at South Carolina State College, but after his freshman year, wishing to see the world beyond South Carolina, Thornwell decided to enlist in the United States Army.

== Army career ==
He enlisted in 1958 and was stationed in Orleans, France. His army sergeant had described him as the finest private he had ever served with. In 1961, when some classified documents identifying nuclear missile sites turned up missing, for unclear reasons, suspicion was focused on Thornwell. Using covert, unconventional, and abusive tactics, Thornwell was interrogated about the missing documents for approximately six months. During this time he was subjected to sleep deprivation, deprivation of the ability to manage basic bodily functions, he was lied to, he made to fear for his life from the French police and the FBI, he was threatened with torture, he was given sodium pentathol, and he was surreptitiously given LSD. During the LSD session, Thornwell felt a great deal of physical pain, including sensations of being pricked by pins all over his body, and sensations of his head "burning." At the time he believed that his interrogator was wielding an electronic device beneath his desk. The interrogators told Thornwell that they could make him permanently insane. Thornwell, believing he would die from the pain, passed out. After that, they stopped interrogating him. According to his attorney, Harvey Kletz, one month before the LSD interrogation, Thornwell had passed a psychological test (was declared "sane"), but three months after the interrogation, Thornwell was given another test and labeled as "'schizoid personality, chronic, severe.'" Thornwell's psychological state was in fact so poor that he was discharged from the army. He was not told that he had been given LSD, nor that he had been used as a research subject, nor was he offered any continuing psychological support for the damage he suffered during the experimental interrogation.

== Lawsuit against federal government ==
Thornwell first learned that he had been used as an experimental test subject and given LSD sometime around 1976, after receiving a follow up letter from the Surgeon General of the Army. In order to discover more about this, Thornwell hired an attorney who obtained documents associated with the case through a Freedom of Information Act (FOIA) request. Thornwell then filed a Federal Tort Claims Act (FTCA) civil suit against the United States government, asking for a public apology from the Army, full disclosure of all information relating to his case, an assurance from President Carter that this kind of human experimentation would not happen again, ten million dollars in compensatory damages for the sixteen years of suffering that he had endured after the interrogation, an upgrade of his general discharge to an honorable discharge, and the appointment of a special prosecutor to determine whether criminal proceedings should be instituted against responsible parties. Thornwell's attorney, Harvey M. Kletz of Berkeley, asked Rep. Ronald V. Dellums (D-Calif.) to introduce a private bill that would compensate Thornwell as the government compensated the family of Dr. Frank R. Olson. Due to the restrictions of the Feres doctrine, a judge ruled that Thornwell could not sue the Army for compensation for the violations which occurred during his deployment; however, he could sue the Army for failing to give him adequate follow up care.

Wishing to avoid an ongoing lawsuit, the Army recommended a $1.7 million settlement. The Senate approved a $1 million settlement, but Congress would only approve $250,000. In the end, Congress and the Senate compromised by offering Thornwell $625,000 in compensation. By accepting this settlement, Thornwell had to drop his lawsuit and give up his pension and VA health benefits. Thornwell accepted. Private Law 96-77 was passed on December 18, 1980.

Thornwell, a television docudrama based on the interrogation and post-interrogation struggles of James R. Thornwell, premiered on CBS January 28, 1981 starring Glynn Turman as the lead character.

== Death ==
James Thornwell, who lived in the San Francisco Bay Area after his discharge, died on June 25, 1984, while swimming in a pool in Vallejo, California. Doctors said he may have drowned due to a seizure. Thornwell reportedly did not have seizures prior to the LSD interrogation.
