= Special Operations Division =

Special Operations Division may refer to:

== Law enforcement ==
- The Special Operations Division of the US Drug Enforcement Administration, dealing with telephone tapping

== Military ==
- Special Operations Division (Bundeswehr), is an airborne division of the German Army
- The Special Operations Division in the United States Army Biological Warfare Laboratories

== Civilian ==
- The Special Activities Center of the Central Intelligence Agency, formerly known as the Special Operations Division
