= Ineva Reilly Baldwin =

Military officer and civic leader

- Born: March 29, 1904; Indianapolis, Indiana, U.S.
- Died: October 2, 2000 (aged 96); Tucson, Arizona, U.S.
- Burial place: Forest Hill Cemetery
- Military career
- Branch: United States Coast Guard
- Service years: 1942–1945
- Rank: Lieutenant commander
- Conflicts: World War II

Ineva Reilly Baldwin (née Reilly; March 29, 1904 – October 2, 2000) was a military officer, civic leader, and the assistant dean of women at the University of Wisconsin–Madison. Baldwin was married to American agricultural bacteriologist Ira Baldwin.

== Early life and education ==
Ineva Frances Reilly was born on March 29, 1904, in Indianapolis, Indiana, to parents Peter C. Reilly and Ineva G. Reilly. Peter Reilly was the founder of the Reilly Tar & Chemical Corporation, also called Reilly Industries, Inc. in Indianapolis.

Baldwin received a total of three bachelor's degrees from the University of Wisconsin–Madison, the University of Geneva, and the University of Colorado. Baldwin later returned to Madison for her graduate studies, eventually earning a master's degree in botany in 1928.

== Career ==
Beginning in the 1930s Baldwin began working for the administrative staff for the University of Colorado, Northwestern University, and the University of Wisconsin. The majority of Ineva's work throughout her career focused on the humanities and the arts. From 1941 to 1942 Ineva served as the assistant dean of women at the University of Wisconsin. Ineva later served as the assistant dean and associate dean of the University of Madison's College of Letters and Science from 1946 to 1954. Ineva later served on the advisory board for the Elvehjem Museum of Art.

== Military service ==
During World War II Baldwin served in the SPARS, the women's branch of the United States Coast Guard Reserve where she rose to the rank of Lieutenant Commander, this was one of the highest ranks achieved by a woman in the Coast Guard. Following the war she returned to her career in education.

== Death ==
Baldwin died on October 2, 2000, in Tucson, Arizona at the age of 96.

== Personal life ==
Baldwin was married twice, first to Dr. Erwin Ferdinand Meyer in 1931, and later to Ira Baldwin in 1954. Ira served as the chair of the Bacteriology Department, he was later the dean of the graduate school, dean of the College of Agriculture, and the vice president for academic affairs.

== Legacy ==
The Baldwin Wisconsin Idea Endowment is a student-based investigative journalism and competitive grant program sponsored by the Office of the Provost of the University of Wisconsin. The program is named after both Ineva and Ira. Many of Baldwin's military artifacts are held by the Wisconsin Veterans Museum in Madison.
