= Building 470 =

Building in Maryland, United States

Coordinates: 39.434039°N 77.430954°W

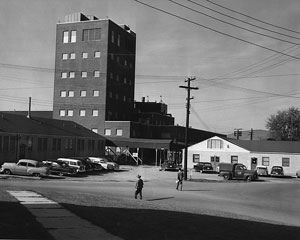
Building 470, ca. 1953.

Building 470 — also called the Pilot Plant, or sometimes "the Tower", or "Anthrax Tower" — was a seven-story steel and brick building at Fort Detrick in Frederick, Maryland, United States, used in the small-scale production of biological warfare (BW) agents. The building, a Cold War era structure, was transferred from the Department of Defense to the National Cancer Institute-Frederick (a unit of the National Institutes of Health) in 1988, to which it belonged until 2003 when it was demolished.

== Structure and design ==
Building 470 was the tallest structure on the Fort Detrick grounds and for many years was the tallest in Frederick County. The structure of the building was unique: a seven-story tower, the configuration of which was dictated by the two 2,500-gallon, three-story high fermentors housed within. Although the building was hermetically sealed and negatively pressurized, false windows and window-sills were added to the exterior during construction in an effort to pass the unusually large structure off as a barracks or office building. Several of the floors of the building were catwalks (steel grating), such that someone, for example, on the fifth floor looked down upon other workers three floors below. (These tanks were used to perfect methods of bacteriological agent production and to provide a source of small amounts of these agents for the development and testing work done elsewhere on the facility. Production of anthrax in bulk for use in actual munitions was done at larger facilities in Arkansas and Indiana.)

The bottom two floors were, in the 1950s and '60s, where scientists showered and changed into street clothes after working with lethal agents. (After work, they returned home to their families where they were prohibited from talking about their livelihood.) A network of pipes fed into two large "kill tanks" in the basement, where unused biological agents were flushed and subjected to a treatment that rendered them harmless.

The top floor contained a powerful ventilation system that kept the building at "negative pressure" (air pressure outside was always greater than inside), a redundant safety feature. If a door to the outside was opened unintentionally, or if a crack appeared in a wall, air would rush in, not out. If any contaminants escaped into the building's hallways, they would not escape to the outside world.

== History ==
=== Construction and use ===
The U.S. Army Biological Warfare Laboratories constructed Building 470 in 1953, at a cost of $1.3 million, as a pilot plant for the production of biological agents as part of the United States' offensive BW program. The program was a part of the nation's Cold War defense against the generally understood threat of biological warfare. From 1954 to 1965, the building was used for production of the bacteria Bacillus anthracis (the cause of anthrax), Francisella tularensis (the cause of tularemia), and Brucella suis (a cause of brucellosis).

Production of biological agents in Building 470 ceased in 1965 and all production and processing equipment were subsequently sterilized. In 1969 President Richard Nixon declared that the U.S. would unilaterally withdraw from the biological arms race, and turned over many Fort Detrick buildings to the National Institutes of Health (NIH) for cancer research. Many buildings (although Building 470 was not yet among them) that had been dedicated to BW research were then deeded to the National Cancer Institute (NCI), decontaminated and renovated for use. In all, approximately 70 acres (280,000 m^{2}) on Fort Detrick were designated as a campus for the NCI. Laboratory work continued in Building 470 until 1970, but no infectious agents were again produced there.

=== Decommissioning ===
In 1970, Building 470 was vacated and a thorough decontamination began. The final decontamination process was completed in June 1971. Electric frying pans with a solid form of paraformaldehyde were placed throughout the building, then heated, releasing clouds of gas inside the sealed structure. Simulant bacteria, similar to anthrax, were left inside to serve as markers indicating whether or not the gas had worked. Thereafter, the Army carried out extensive testing and found no evidence of any of the biological agents previously produced there. Samples from approximately 1,500 locations throughout the building tested negative for B. anthracis. The Army declared the building safe for occupancy – although not for renovation – including by workers who had not been immunized against anthrax.

In 1988, the NCI acquired Building 470 as well with the expectation that it, too, might be remodeled and converted to cancer research laboratories. It had been vacant for 17 years, serving only as storage space where employees stashed files or excess lab supplies. Because of the unique (and anachronistic) design structure of the building, however, this was deemed to be prohibitively expensive.

In September 2000, safety experts from the Massachusetts Institute of Technology, Duke University, and Science Applications International Corporation reviewed the post-decontamination quality assurance test data and concluded that there was no evidence of any residual contamination in the building. The success of the decontamination was tested the following month, when examination of an additional 790 samples revealed no trace of living or dead B. anthracis. These samples were analyzed by either conventional culture methods or by polymerase chain reaction (PCR), a more sensitive DNA-based test.

Ultimately, Building 470 fell into alarmingly poor structural condition. The exterior mortar and brick of the building buckled and the roof leaked. Corroded beams and columns, cracked and peeling plaster, and blistering paint contributed to the disrepair of the building, which was in close proximity to several other buildings. It was determined that this deterioration could lead to significant structural failure and risk to adjacent buildings and the employees occupying them.

=== Demolition ===
Due to the significant structural deterioration, the demolition of Building 470 was recommended in 1999 by NCI engineers. Carol Shearer, the 470 Project Engineer and an expert in dismantling former bioweapons facilities in the former Soviet Union, stated the main concern was not anthrax, but noise and vibration—and most importantly, the disruption of science in the adjoining and adjacent buildings.

After an EIS and period for public comment, the state of Maryland approved removal of the building. The NIH dismantled the building between February and December 2003. Officials did not concern themselves much with possible anthrax contamination, but concentrated rather on asbestos and lead paint.

== Urban legends ==
Residents of Frederick County are familiar with many stories about deaths occurring in Building 470 or as a result of working there. One of the more lurid stories had it that a dead man was sealed within its walls. According to Robert H. Wiltrout, associate director of the NCI-Frederick, the building, although “an anachronism and a throwback," was "a lightning rod for all of the things that happened at Fort Detrick".

One perennial tale held that because of a massive accident involving deadly biological agents, the government could never be entirely sure that the building was safe to occupy and therefore it was closed and sealed up. It had to be left standing because officials couldn't be sure the bacteria were truly gone. In fact, a large spill did occur in Building 470 in 1958. A technician, trying to pry open a stuck valve at the bottom of a fermentor, unintentionally released approximately 2,000 gallons of liquid B. anthracis culture. Because of the design of the building and the safety measures in place, it was possible to isolate the spill to one room. There was no contamination of Fort Detrick or the local community, and no one (including the technician) became ill. The outcome of the incident was taken to indicate the effectiveness of the biological safety practices pioneered during the early days of “bioweaponeering” at Fort Detrick.

In the lead up to its demolition, Dr. George Anderson of Southern Research Institute, an internationally recognized expert on B. anthracis, exhaustively reviewed documents on Building 470 and interviewed many of the men, some still residing in Frederick, who had worked in the building. He learned that no one working in Building 470 had died of anthrax, although three workers elsewhere on Fort Detrick had died of infection with agents that were being researched as biological weapons: one, a microbiologist in 1951, and another, an electrician in 1958, died of inhalational anthrax. The third worker died of Bolivian hemorrhagic fever.

== See also ==
- William C. Patrick III
