= Nallin Farm House =

Historic house in Maryland, United States

- U.S. National Register of Historic Places
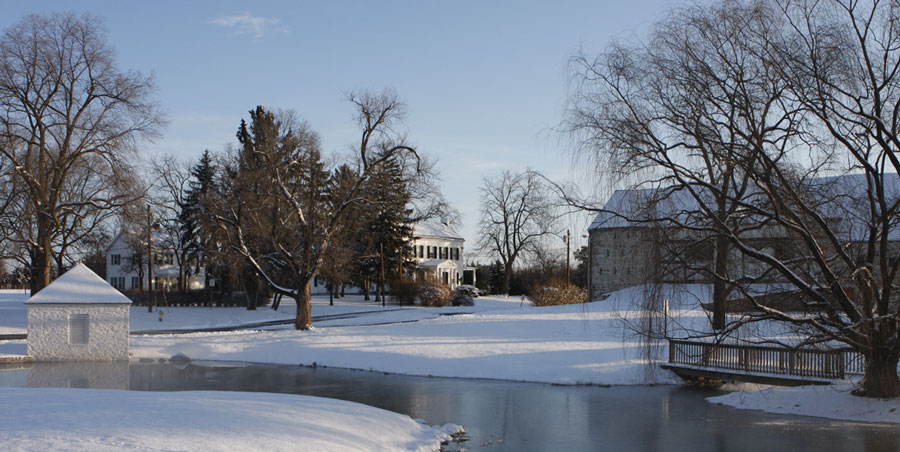

- Location within Maryland Location within the United States
- Location: Fort Detrick, Frederick, Maryland, USA
- Coordinates: 39°26′52″N 77°24′51″W
- Area: 0.5 acres (0.20 ha)
- Built: 1835
- NRHP reference No.: 74000951
- Added to NRHP: May 23, 1974

The Nallin Farm House and the related Nallin Farm Springhouse and Bank Barn are located on Fort Detrick at Frederick, Maryland.

The Federal style brick farmhouse was built in stages between the 1780s and the 1830s and formerly served as the residence of the Fort Detrick commanding officer. It is known on post as "Building 1652".

The Nallin Farm was incorporated into Fort Detrick upon the post's expansion in 1955. It was added to the National Register of Historic Places on May 23, 1974.
