= Project Third Chance =

U.S. Army intelligence project (1961–1963)

Project Third Chance was a covert, experimental program conducted by U.S. Army Intelligence between 1961 and 1963. The project’s stated goal was "operational field testing of LSD" as an aid to counterintelligence interrogation, primarily taking place in Europe. Along with Project Derby Hat, it constituted the third and final phase of the Army's "Material Testing Program EA 1729," "EA 1729" being the Army's designator for LSD. Third Chance and Derby Hat together involved 16 unwitting nonvolunteer subjects who were interrogated after receiving the drug. One notable subject was U.S. Army Private James Robert Thornwell.

== Background and Execution ==
The Army's LSD testing program ran from about 1955 to 1967. Following two phases of laboratory testing involving more than 1,000 volunteers, the Army Assistant Chief of Staff for Intelligence (ACSI) authorized operational field testing of LSD. Project Third Chance received verbal approval from ACSI General Willems on December 7, 1960, and formally began field testing in May 1961.

Project Third Chance was carried out by an Army Special Purpose Team (SPT) in Europe, primarily between May and August 1961. The operation involved 11 separate interrogations of 10 "unwitting nonvolunteer subjects." All but one of the subjects were "alleged to be foreign intelligence sources or agents." The methodology included the covert administration of LSD to subjects prior to interrogation.

== Case of James Robert Thornwell ==
The one known exception to the subjects being foreign agents was James Robert Thornwell, a U.S. Army private who was stationed in France and suspected of stealing classified documents.

Thornwell was subjected to six months of extensive, abusive, and unconventional interrogation tactics, including sleep and food deprivation, threats, and the unwitting administration of LSD and other drugs. The Church Report notes that Thornwell was the only U.S. soldier included in the Project Third Chance tests and that he "exhibited symptoms of severe paranoia while under the influence of the drug."

== Exposure and Aftermath ==
Revelations regarding Project Third Chance, and the broader LSD testing program, came to light as part of the investigations by the Church Committee (United States Senate Select Committee to Study Governmental Operations with Respect to Intelligence Activities), whose final report detailed the extent of the testing in 1976.

Further public attention was drawn to the program between 1977 and 1981 when major American newspapers and television networks covered the case of James Robert Thorwell.

Thornwell was ultimately discharged from the Army without being charged and later sued the U.S. government for damages stemming from the experimental interrogation. Thornwell eventually won some compensation via an act of Congress.

=== Related lawsuit ===
Another legal challenge related to the Army's LSD testing was filed by James V. Stanley, a former Army sergeant who was unwittingly administered LSD in 1958 while volunteering for a chemical warfare program (Material Testing Program EA 1729) in violation of military regulations.

The lawsuit reached the Supreme Court in 1987 in a case, United States v. Stanley, that centered on whether the Feres doctrine protected the government from liability in cases of injury to military personnel resulting from nonconsensual military experiments. The court ultimately ruled that the Feres doctrine barred Stanley's suit for damages.

== Termination ==
In April 1963, a briefing on the results of Project Third Chance and Project Derby Hat concluded that further field testing was required before LSD could be used as a reliable aid to counterintelligence. Immediately following the briefing, Deputy ACSI General C. F. Leonard directed that no further field testing be undertaken.

The Army subsequently revised its regulation on drug use in interrogations, requiring prior Department of the Army permission and noting that "Medical research has established that information obtained through the use of these drugs is unreliable and invalid." The adoption of this regulation marked the effective termination of the field testing programs, which officially concluded in September 1963.

== See also ==
- James Robert Thornwell
- Unethical human experimentation in the United States
