= MKCHICKWIT =

CIA/DOD covert human experimentation program

Project MKCHICKWIT, or CHICKWIT was a covert program of the US Department of Defense operated in conjunction with the CIA. A partner program to MKULTRA, the goal of MKCHICKWIT was to "identify new drug developments in Europe and Asia and to obtain information and samples".

== See also ==
- Project MKULTRA
