= Nallin Farm Springhouse and Bank Barn =

- U.S. National Register of Historic Places
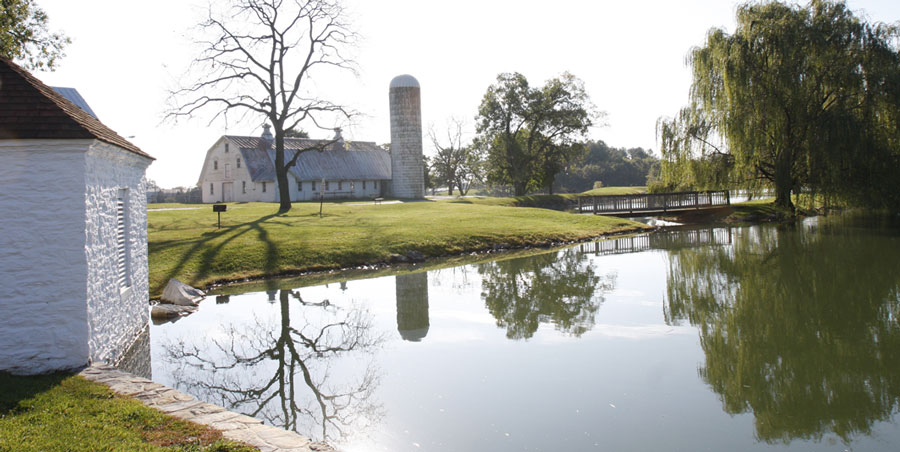

- Location within Maryland Location within the United States
- Location: Fort Detrick, Frederick, Maryland, USA
- Coordinates: 39°26′50″N 77°24′54″W
- Area: less than one acre
- Built: 1800
- NRHP reference No.: 77000695
- Added to NRHP: September 16, 1977

The Nallin Farm Springhouse and Bank Barn are closely associated with the Nallin Farm House on the grounds of Fort Detrick, Maryland, US. The barn is a good example of a fieldstone-built bank barn with a byre on the lower level and an earth ramp on the opposite side providing access to a haymow.

The simple stone springhouse is the source of 3 1/2-acre Nallin Pond. The barn and springhouse were built c. 1800.

The Nallin Farm Springhouse and Bank Barn was listed on the National Register of Historic Places in 1977.

The barn has a hay hood, as can be seen in the 14th of 17 photos included in the nomination.
