= Simulant =

Simulant may refer to:

== Entertainment ==
- Simulant (film), a 2023 Canadian science fiction film
- Rogue Simulants, characters in the television show Red Dwarf

== Materials ==
- Diamond simulant, imitation material similar to diamond
- Lunar regolith simulant, material used to simulate the surface of the Moon
- Martian regolith simulant, material used to simulate the Martian surface
- Pearl simulant, imitation material similar to pearls

== See also ==
- Simulacrum
