= Ira Baldwin =

American agricultural bacteriologist

Ira L. Baldwin
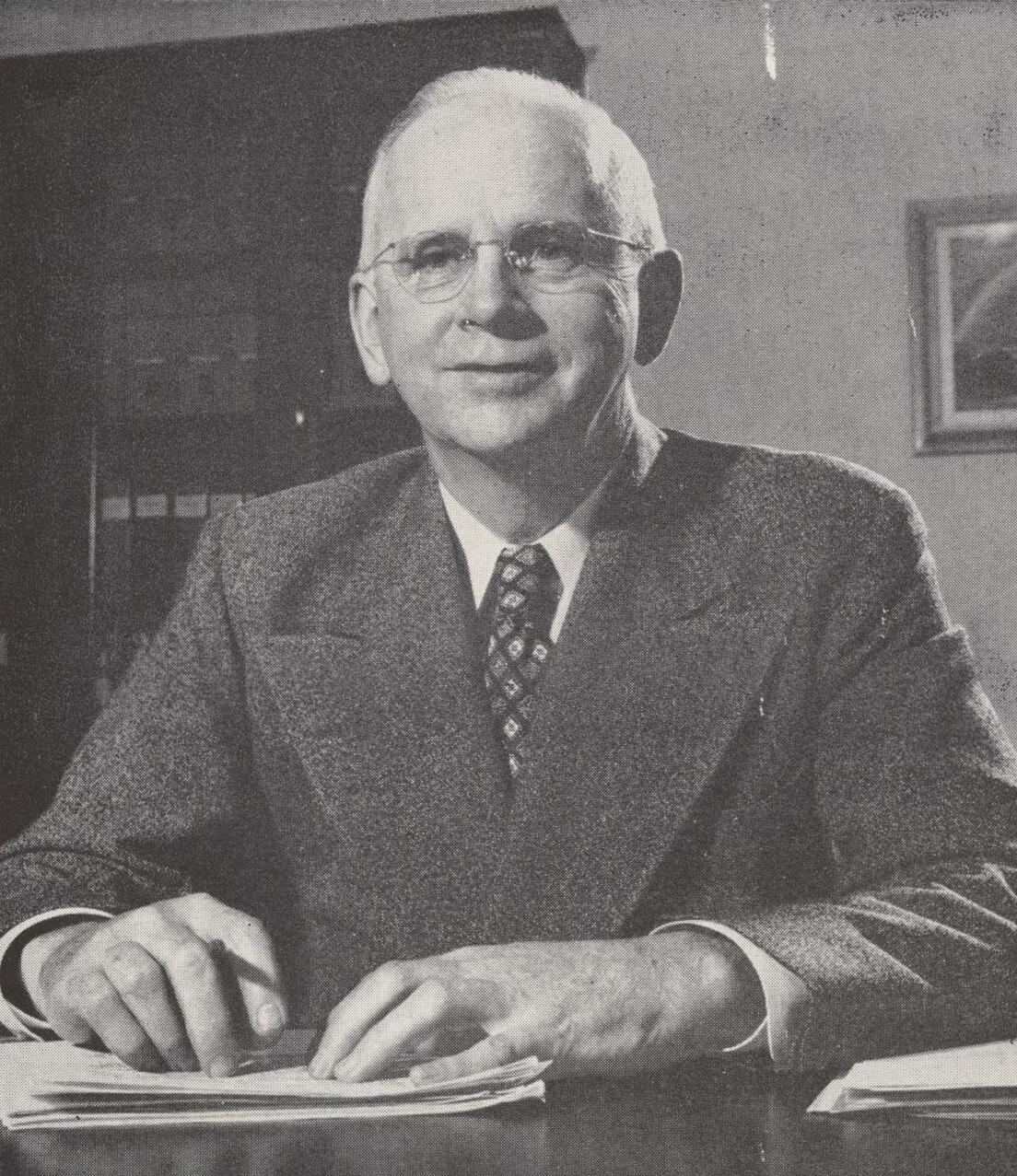
- Baldwin in 1950
- Born: August 20, 1895; Indiana, U.S.
- Died: August 9, 1999 (aged 103); Tucson, Arizona, U.S.
- Education: Purdue University (BA); University of Wisconsin–Madison (PhD)
- Occupation: Biologist
- Spouse: Ineva Reilly Baldwin
- Writing career
- Subject: bacteriology

Ira Lawrence Baldwin (August 20, 1895 – August 9, 1999) was the founder and director emeritus of the Wisconsin Academy Foundation. He began teaching bacteriology at the University of Wisconsin in 1927 and a few years later moved into what became a career in administration. He held positions as chair of the Department of Bacteriology, dean of the Graduate School, dean and director of the College of Agriculture, university vice president for academic affairs, and special assistant to the president. He was also involved in programs for agricultural development both in the United States and abroad. Ira Baldwin wrote a hostile review of Rachel Carson's Silent Spring, titled "Chemicals and Pests," in the journal Science.

== Biography ==
=== Early life and education ===
Ira Baldwin was born in 1895 on a 40-acre farm in Indiana. In his youth, he earned money to attend college by selling ducks and husking corn. He served state-side as a second lieutenant in an artillery unit. Baldwin attended college at Purdue University and earned a Ph.D. at the University of Wisconsin–Madison.

=== Career ===
George W. Merck, a key member of the panel advising President Franklin D. Roosevelt on aspects of biological warfare, brought many scientists into uniform for a top secret, coordinated effort to defend against possible enemy use of biological weapons and to devise a capability to respond in kind to such an attack. Among them was Baldwin, then a professor of bacteriology at the University of Wisconsin. In 1943, Baldwin became the first scientific director of the U.S. Army Biological Warfare Laboratories at Camp Detrick, Maryland.

Baldwin and other scientists were called in for a secret meeting in Washington. After hearing that Germany and Japan were going to start the use of biological warfare, they were asked if it was possible for the United States to produce a substantial amount of their own biological agents. Baldwin responded with, "[I]f you could do it in a test tube, you could do it in a 10,000-gallon tank. If you get enough tanks I'm sure you will get tons." About a month after the meeting, Baldwin was individually called by Colonel William Kabrich of the Army's Chemical Warfare Service and asked if he would lead the project. Although it only took him a day to say yes, Baldwin went through a lot of thought processing as he assessed the moral ramifications of what he was about to do. What he said to Kabrich was, "you start out with the idea in war of killing people, and that to me is the immoral part of it. It doesn't make much difference how you kill them."

Baldwin found a site suitable for making the deadly microbes. It had to be close enough to Washington, but not too close. He chose an abandoned airfield in Maryland called Detrick Field, which later became known as Camp Detrick. Next, Baldwin hired a staff, recruiting many who had worked with him at the University of Wisconsin, along with other scientists and military personnel. At the end of the research, Baldwin and his crew had successfully produced a large amount of biological agent to use in warfare. Baldwin was most proud of the safety arrangements that came with the operation. Nothing went wrong, and everything came out as planned, if not better.

After World War II, Baldwin returned to the University of Wisconsin, becoming the vice president of academic affairs in 1948 and special assistant to the university's president a decade later. Even after he resigned as leader of the operation, Baldwin stayed active with the biological weapons program. He continued to be worried that opponents of the United States might try to subtly use microbes to harm the country. He therefore suggested many experiments, which ended up taking place, to test how certain places would be affected by possible environmental changes that come from biowarfare. He died a few days before his 104th birthday in 1999. He is buried in Forest Hill Cemetery in Madison.

=== Personal life ===
Baldwin was married to Ineva Reilly Baldwin in 1954.

== See also ==
- Rachel Carson
