= Frank Olson =

American bacteriologist (1910–1953)

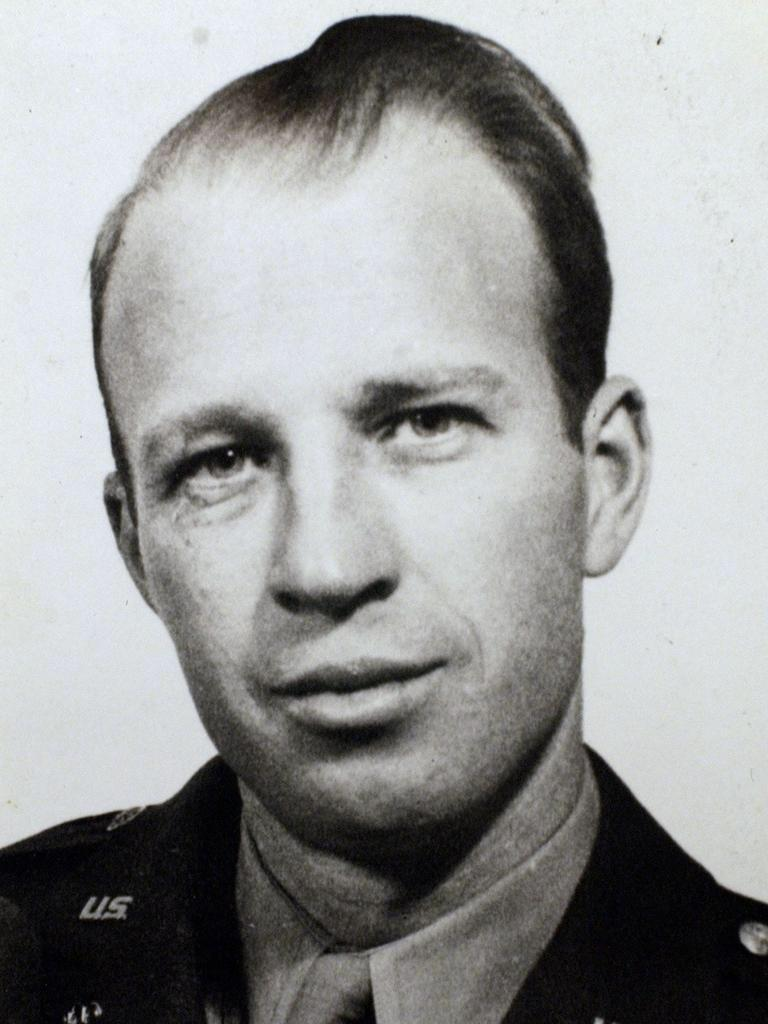
- Born: July 17, 1910; Hurley, Wisconsin, U.S.
- Died: November 28, 1953 (aged 43); New York City, New York, U.S.
- Education: University of Wisconsin
- Spouse: Alice Smith "Wicks" Olson
- Children: 3
- Military career
- Allegiance: United States
- Branch: United States Army: Army Medical Corps
- Service years: 1941–1953
- Rank: Captain
- Conflicts: World War II; Korean War: Project Artichoke; Operation Big Switch

Frank Rudolph Emmanuel Olson (July 17, 1910 – November 28, 1953) was an American bacteriologist, biological warfare scientist, and an employee of the United States Army Biological Warfare Laboratories (USBWL) who worked at Camp Detrick (now Fort Detrick) in Maryland. At a meeting in rural Maryland, he was covertly dosed with LSD by his colleague Sidney Gottlieb (head of the CIA's MKUltra program) and, nine days later, plunged to his death from the window of the Hotel Statler in New York. The U.S. government first described his death as a suicide, and then as misadventure, while others allege murder. The Rockefeller Commission report on the CIA in 1975 acknowledged their having conducted covert drug studies on fellow agents. Olson's death is one of the most mysterious outcomes of the CIA mind control project MKUltra.

== Biography ==
=== Youth and education ===
Olson was born to Swedish immigrant parents in Hurley, Iron County, Wisconsin. Olson graduated from Hurley High School in 1927. Olson enrolled at the University of Wisconsin, earning both a B.S. and, in 1938, a Ph.D. in bacteriology. He married his classmate, Alice, and would go on to have three children. Olson enrolled in the Reserve Officers' Training Corps to help pay off his college costs, and was called to active duty at Fort Hood in Texas as the United States entered World War II. Olson worked for a short time at Purdue University's Agricultural Experimentation Station before being called to active duty.

=== Work with the Army & CIA ===
Olson served as a captain in the U.S. Army Chemical Corps. In December 1942, he got a call from Ira Baldwin, his thesis adviser at UW and the future mentor of Sidney Gottlieb, who would go on to be the CIA's leading chemist and director of MK-ULTRA. Ira had been called to leave his University post to direct a secret program regarding the development of biological weapons, and wanted Olson to join him as one of the first scientists at what would become Fort Detrick. The army transferred him to Edgewood Arsenal in Maryland. A few months later, the Chemical Corps took over Detrick and established its secret Biologicals Warfare Laboratories.

At Camp Detrick, Baldwin worked with industrial partners such as George W. Merck and the U.S. military to establish the top secret U.S. bioweapons program beginning in 1943, during World War II, a time when interest in applying modern technology to warfare was high. Olson also worked with ex-Nazis who had been brought into the country through Operation Paperclip on the utilization of aerosolized anthrax.

Olson was discharged from the Army in 1944 and remained at Detrick on a civilian contract, continuing his research into aerobiology. In 1949, he joined many other Detrick scientists in Antigua for Operation Harness, which tested the vulnerability of different animals to toxic clouds. In 1950, he was a part of Operation Sea-Spray, where the bacterium Serratia marcescens was released into the coastal mists of San Francisco through a minesweeper, reaching all of San Francisco's 800,000 residents, as well as people living in eight surrounding cities. Olson traveled often to Fort Terry, a secret army base off Long Island, where toxins too deadly to be brought onto the U.S. mainland were tested.

This was the period where senior military officials and CIA officers were becoming deeply troubled at Soviet progress, and feared they were heading towards mastery of microbe warfare. Their alarm led to the forming of the Special Operations Division at Detrick in spring of 1949, with the purpose of conducting research on covert ways to utilize chemical weapons. SOD was known as a "Detrick within a Detrick" due to its level of secrecy. Olson became acting chief of SOD within a year of its creation, originally invited to join by colleague and SOD's first chief, John Schwab.

At some point while assigned as a civilian U.S. Army contractor, Olson began working as a CIA employee. In May 1952, Frank Olson was appointed to the committee for Project Artichoke, an experimental CIA interrogation program.

=== Disaffection ===
By the time Olson stepped down as chief of SOD in early 1953, citing "pressures of the job" that aggravated his ulcers, he had officially joined the CIA after working closely with them for years. He did stay with SOD, which functioned as a CIA research station hidden within a military base. Olson did a lot of work at Detrick that his children said had a lasting effect on his psyche. Olson witnessed and assisted in the poisoning, gassing, and torture of laboratory animals at Detrick, which his son Eric recalled having a deep effect on Olson: "He'd come to work in the morning and see piles of dead monkeys. That messes with you. He wasn't the right guy for that." Olson also witnessed multiple torture sessions in international CIA safe-houses, where people were "literally interrogated to death in experimental methods combining drugs, hypnosis, and torture to attempt to master brainwashing techniques and memory erasing."

On February 23, 1953, the Chinese broadcast charges that two captured American pilots had claimed the U.S. was conducting germ warfare against North Korea. Other captured Americans such as Colonel Walker "Bud" Mahurin made similar statements. The United States government threatened to charge some POWs with treason for cooperating with their captors. After their release, the prisoners of war would publicly repudiate their confessions as having been extracted by torture. On July 27, 1953, the Korean Armistice Agreement was signed, launching Operation Big Switch, the repatriation of Korean War POWs. Twenty-one American POWs refused repatriation and defected, and the returning POWs were viewed as potential security risks. As a result, debriefings became "hostile investigations in search of possible disloyalty". The day the armistice was signed, Olson, a bacteriologist, arrived in Northolt, UK. Olson's home movies from the trip indicate he traveled to London, Paris, Stockholm, and Berlin. Upon his return, Olson's mood was noticeably changed, according to his family. According to coworker Norman Cournoyer, Olson had witnessed interrogations in Europe and become convinced that the United States had used biological weapons during the Korean War. Journalist Gordon Thomas claims that Olson subsequently visited William Sargant, a British psychiatrist with high level security clearances. According to Thomas, Sargant reported that Olson had become a security threat and his access to military facilities should be limited.

Olson had spent a decade at Detrick and knew all the secrets of the Special Operations Division. He frequently traveled to Germany to witness interrogation sessions in multiple secret prisons (evidence places Olson in Frankfurt, Berlin, and Heidelberg), where the victims would occasionally die from trauma of the tactics used. Olson was one of the several SOD scientists who traveled to, or through, France in the summer of '51 when the French village of Pont-Saint-Esprit was poisoned by naturally occurring ergot, the fungus from which LSD was derived.

=== Drugging of Olson ===
A semi-monthly retreat of the men closest to MK-ULTRA was scheduled at a cabin at Deep Creek Lake for Wednesday, November 18, to Friday, November 20, 1953. A tentative participants list included twelve names:

Fort Detrick participants

- Olson, a scientist with the Special Operations Division of the United States Army Biological Warfare Laboratories at Fort Detrick, who was suspected of being a security risk.
- Lt. Col. Vincent Ruwet, Olson's supervisor, the head of the Special Operations Division.
- John L. Schwab, who had founded the division and in 1953 served as its lab chief
- John Stubbs, one of the Fort Detrick personnel
- Benjamin Wilson, a member of the Special Operations Division.
- Herbert "Bert" Tanner, one of the Fort Detrick personnel
- John C. Malinowski, a Detrick staffer who didn't drink alcohol and thus was not dosed.
- Gerald Yonetz, a Special Operations Division scientist

CIA participants

- Sidney Gottlieb, a CIA chemist responsible for Project MKUltra.
- Robert Lashbrook, Gottlieb's deputy, who dosed the liquor everyone was drinking along with Gottlieb.
- A. Hughes, suspected to be CIA
- Henry Bortner, of the CIA

=== Aftermath of drugging ===
On Thursday evening, November 19, around 7:30, Olson and some of the other participants were drugged with a "potential truth serum", decades later discovered to be LSD. The next morning, Olson headed back to Maryland a changed man. Having dinner with his family, Olson refused to eat, and seemed distant from his family, not speaking about his trip or attending to his children. He blurted out to his wife, "I've made a terrible mistake." MK-ULTRA had been underway for seven months at this time, and barely two dozen men knew the true nature and intentions of the project.

On November 23, Olson and his boss, Lt. Col. Vincent Ruwet, arrived to work at Detrick, both still in bad shape from the retreat. Ruwet later recalled that Olson appeared to be agitated, and asked if Ruwet should fire him or if he should quit. While Ruwet was able to calm him down for the day, Olson only worsened by the next day. Ruwet later testified Olson was "disoriented," felt "all mixed up" about the work he had been doing, and felt "incompetent" in his field.

=== Attempted resignation ===
On Tuesday, November 24, Olson went to work as usual, but unexpectedly returned home before noon, accompanied by a coworker, John Stubbs. Olson explained Stubbs's presence to his wife by saying "They're afraid I might hurt you." Olson informed his wife that he had agreed to undergo psychiatric treatment.

That same day, Olson, Ruwet, and CIA chemist Robert Lashbrook flew to New York City. In New York, Olson and Lashbrook met with Harold Abramson, a CIA-linked medical doctor, who had worked with Olson years earlier on studies of aerosolization.

=== Death ===
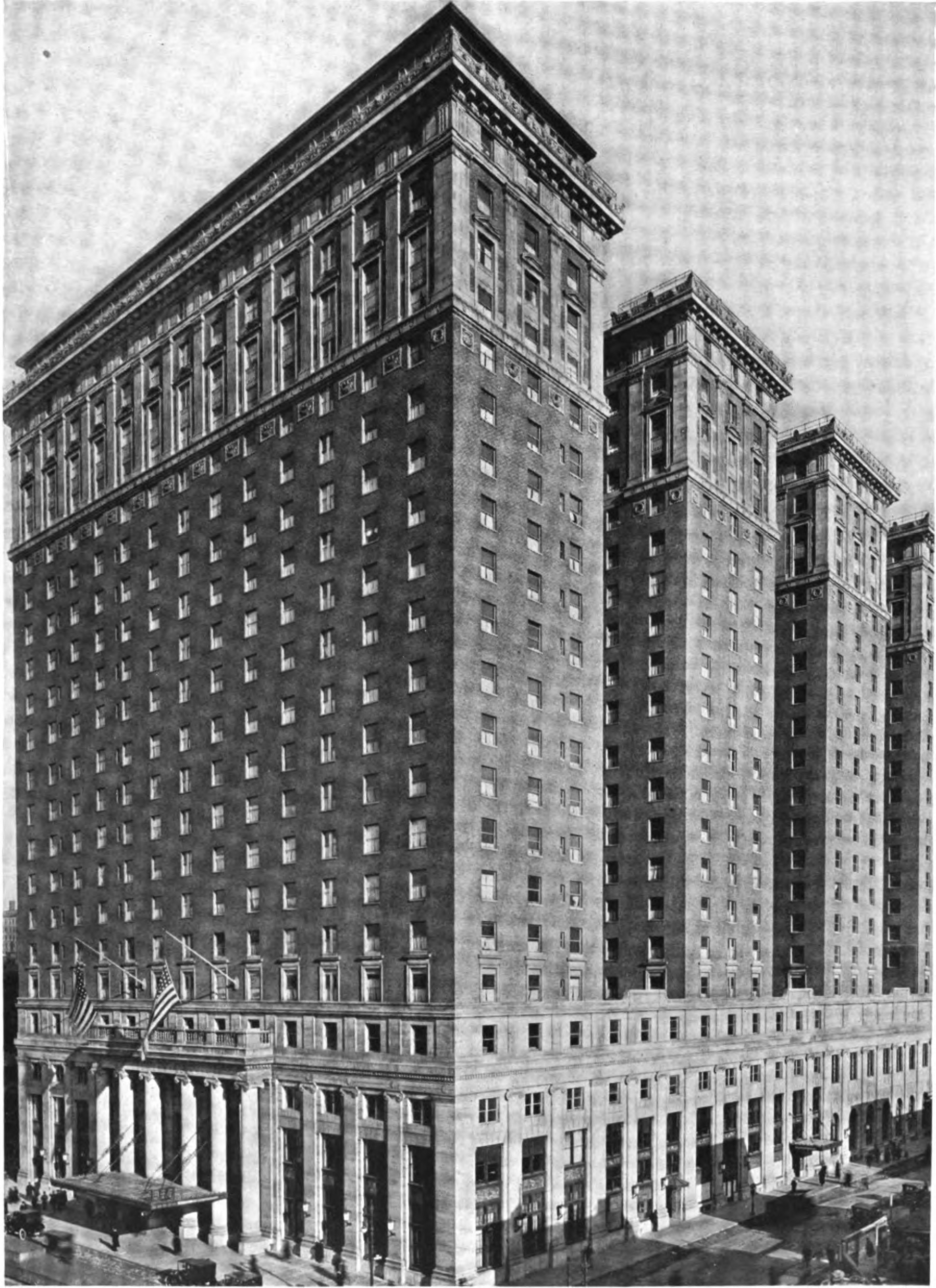
The Hotel Pennsylvania, NYC (called the Hotel Statler in 1953).

Around 2 a.m. on the morning of Saturday, November 28, 1953, Olson plummeted onto the sidewalk in front of the Statler Hilton Hotel (formerly the Hotel Pennsylvania). The night manager rushed to Olson, who was still alive and who "tried to mumble something". Olson died before medical help arrived. Years later, the night manager recalled "In all my years in the hotel business, I never encountered a case where someone got up in the middle of the night, ran across a dark room in his underwear, avoiding two beds, and dove through a closed window with the shade and curtains drawn."

When police entered the hotel room, they found Robert Lashbrook sitting on the toilet in the room he shared with Olson.

The hotel’s switchboard operator reported having connected a call from room 1018A to a number listed as belonging to Dr. Harold Abramson. According to the operator, who overheard the entirety of the brief call, the occupant in 1018A reported "Well, he's gone." to which the call's recipient had replied "Well, that’s too bad."

Lashbrook's wallet contained the initials, address, and phone number of magician-turned-CIA asset John Mullholland. Lashbrook claimed he and Olson had visited Mulholland, although this is disputed by author H.P. Albarelli.

At the scene, and in their written report, the two police officers discussed similarities to the 1948 Laurence Duggan case, in which a high-level government official suspected of espionage died after plummeting from his New York office. The ensuing police report said that on his last night in Manhattan, Olson purposely threw himself out of the window of his tenth-floor hotel room at the Hotel Statler, which he had been sharing with Lashbrook, and died shortly after impact.

== Murder and wrongful death allegations ==
=== 1975 ===
Although Olson's family told friends that he "fell or jumped" and had suffered "a fatal nervous breakdown" which resulted in the fall, the family had no real knowledge of the specific details surrounding the tragedy, until the Rockefeller Commission uncovered some of the CIA's MKULTRA activities in 1975. That year, the government admitted that Olson had been dosed with LSD, without his knowledge, nine days before his death. After the family announced they planned to sue the Agency over Olson's "wrongful death," the government offered them an out-of-court settlement of $1,250,000, later reduced to $750,000 (about $3.8 million in 2021 value), which they accepted. The family received apologies from President Gerald Ford and CIA director William Colby.

=== 1977 ===
The death of Federal Bureau of Narcotics (FBN) Supervisory Agent at Large George Hunter White led his wife to donate all of his written materials to Foothill College. (They are now located in the Stanford University Libraries). Subsequently, the CIA redacted many of the documents, but also obtained many of them for use in the CIA's Victims Task Force, designed to reach settlements with the victims of MKUltra. His diaries and later interviews by the author H.P. Abereilli show that White had been given responsibility for watching over Olson at the Statler Hotel, but had to leave the city to take care of his mother. As a result, he left stewardship of the room to Jacques Voignier, also known to the CIA as "Jean Pierre Lafitte," (and dozens of other names) a high-ranking member of Union Corse who had been brought into the FBN. Voignier had already been working at the hotel, employed under his alias Pierre Lafitte. At some point, Voignier's childhood friend, François Spirito, the leader of the French Connection and Union Corse at the time, came to the Statler Hotel.

=== 1994–1996 ===
In 1994, Eric Olson had his father's body exhumed to be buried with his mother. The family decided to have a second autopsy performed. The 1953 medical report completed immediately after Dr. Olson's death indicated that there were cuts and abrasions on the body. Theories that sparked about Olson having been assassinated by the CIA led to the second autopsy, which was performed by James Starrs, Professor of Law and Forensic Science at the George Washington University National Law Center. His team searched the body for any cuts and abrasions and found none, though did find a large hematoma on the left side of Olson's head and a large injury on his chest. Most of the team concluded that the blunt-force trauma to the head and the injury to the chest had not occurred during the fall, but most likely before the fall (one team member dissented). Starrs called the evidence "rankly and starkly suggestive of homicide."

Also in 1994, Eric Olson testified before the U.S. House of Representatives' "Legislation and National Security Subcommittee of the Committee on Government Operations" hearings on the US Government's "Cold War Era Human Subject Experiments". He spoke about how the sudden and mysterious death of his father deeply affected his family and appealed to the Congress to help with their ongoing battle to get the CIA to release more details of his father's final days.

In 1996, Eric Olson approached the U.S. District Attorney in Manhattan, Robert Morgenthau, to see if his office would open a new investigation. Stephen Saracco and Daniel Bibb of the office's "cold case" unit collected preliminary information, including a deposition of Lashbrook, but concluded that there was no compelling case to send to a grand jury. In 2001, Canadian historian Michael Ignatieff wrote for The New York Times Magazine an account of Eric's decades-long campaign to clear his father's name. Eric Olson asserts that the forensic evidence of death is suggestive of a method used by the CIA found in the first manual of assassination that says "The most efficient accident, in simple assassination, is a fall of 75 feet or more onto a hard surface."

=== 2012–2013 ===
On November 28, 2012, sons Eric and Nils Olson filed suit in the US District Court in Washington, D.C., seeking unspecified compensatory damages as well as access to documents related to their father's death and other matters that they claimed the CIA had withheld from them. The case was dismissed in July 2013, due in part to the 1976 settlement between the family and government. In the decision dismissing the suit, U.S. District Judge James Boasberg wrote, "While the court must limit its analysis to the four corners of the complaint, the skeptical reader may wish to know that the public record supports many of the allegations [in the family's suit], farfetched as they may sound."

=== 2017–2018 ===
Netflix released a documentary miniseries, entitled Wormwood (2017), based on the mystery of Olson's death; it was directed by Errol Morris. In the miniseries, journalist Seymour Hersh says the government had a security process to identify and execute domestic dissidents (perceived to pose a risk). He said that Frank Olson was a victim of this and an ongoing cover-up after his death. However, Hersh explained that he cannot elaborate or publish on the facts because it would compromise his source.

Writing for The New York Review of Books, scholar Michael Ignatieff concludes "Though I still resist the facts, the facts, as [Eric] Olson’s research has established, are that Allen Dulles, Richard Helms, and other unnamed persons at the highest levels of the American government ordered the death of Eric’s father [Frank Olson] because they feared he knew too much about US biological warfare during the Korean War and about the torture and execution of Soviet agents and ex-Nazi "expendables" in black sites in Europe during the early 1950s. Having killed him, the CIA confected the story that Olson's death was a suicide brought on by stress, and later attributed his jump from the window to the effects of a cocktail laced with LSD. It now appears that the LSD was administered, at a CIA retreat in Maryland, to discover exactly what Olson knew. When this experiment revealed that he was indeed "unreliable," he was taken to New York and disposed of." Academic Milton Leitenberg strongly disputed Ignatieff's conclusions, arguing that "there was no biological warfare carried out by any agency of the US government during the Korean War, or for that matter by anyone else."

== See also ==
- Harold Blauer
- James Forrestal
- Laurence Duggan
