= United States Army Biological Warfare Laboratories =

Research laboratory

Coordinates: 39°26′8″N 77°25′38″W

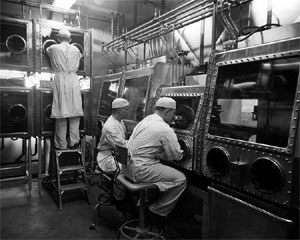
Researchers working with Class III cabinets at the USBWL, Camp Detrick, Maryland (1940s). Cabinet air was filtered and drawn by negative pressure from the room and cabinet systems.

The U.S. Army Biological Warfare Laboratories (USBWL) was a suite of research laboratories and pilot plant centers operating at Camp (later Fort) Detrick, Maryland, United States, beginning in 1943 under the control of the U.S. Army Chemical Corps Research and Development Command. The USBWL undertook research and development into biocontainment, decontamination, gaseous sterilization, and agent production and purification for the U.S. offensive biological warfare program. The laboratories and their projects were discontinued in 1969.

== History ==
=== Origins ===
The USBWL was created after Secretary of War Henry L. Stimson requested the National Academy of Sciences (NAS) in 1941 to review the feasibility of biological warfare (BW). The following year, the NAS reported that BW might be feasible and recommended that steps be taken to reduce U.S. vulnerability to BW attacks. After that, the official policy of the United States was first to deter the use of BW against U.S. forces and secondarily to retaliate if deterrence failed.

=== World War II ===
Throughout the war years, Dr. Ira L. Baldwin, professor of bacteriology at the University of Wisconsin–Madison, was scientific director of the Laboratories.

=== Cold War ===
The USBWL were the United States' front-line defense against BW during the first half of the Cold War.

=== Disestablishment ===
In 1969, the USBWL ceased to exist when President Richard Nixon disestablished all offensive BW studies and directed the destruction of all stockpiles of BW agents and munitions.

== Operations ==
At Fort Detrick, the USBWL consisted of various labs and divisions, including:

- The Safety "S" Division, first to be activated (1943)
  - Biological Protection Branch
- The Special Operations (or Projects) Division (1949–68), the most highly classified work
  - Conducted hundreds of field tests of aerosolized simulants;
  - Investigated and developed drugs for use in "brainwashing" and interrogation
- Planning Pilot-Engineering (PP-E) Division
- The Crops Division (called "Plant Sciences Laboratories" after 1966), evaluated thousands of compounds for herbicidal activity (including Agent Orange; see Herbicidal warfare)
- The Basic Science [Division?]
- Division B, pursued anthrax vaccine work

The USBWL was also a parent facility overseeing testing and production centers elsewhere, including:

- Pine Bluff Arsenal, Arkansas
- Horn Island, Mississippi
- Dugway Proving Ground, Utah, including Granite Peak Installation
- Vigo Ordnance Plant, near Terre Haute, Indiana

== Work-related deaths ==
Three deaths related to occupational bio-agent exposures occurred during the USBWL program. (Additionally, an unnamed lieutenant died in a pump explosion in Building 201 in 1943.)

- William Allen Boyles, a 46-year-old microbiologist, contracted anthrax and died on 25 November 1951. Boyles Street, on Fort Detrick, is named in his honor. His internal organs were harvested after his death to isolate the anthrax contained in them.
- Joel Eugene Willard, a 53-year-old electrician, died in 1958 after contracting pulmonary anthrax. Willard Place, on Fort Detrick, is named in his honor.
- Albert Nickel, a 53-year-old animal caretaker, died in 1964 after being bitten by an animal infected with Machupo virus. Nickel Place, on Fort Detrick, is named in his honor.

The army made details of these deaths public in 1975.

== Reunions ==
The "Fort Detrick Reunion Group" met most years between 1991 and 2008 when they disbanded for lack of participants. When they met at Nallin Pond in 1994, their numbers peaked at 400. They consisted of a diverse group of USBWL participants ranging from animal caretakers to top scientists.

== See also ==
- Building 470
- Fort Terry
- One-Million-Liter Test Sphere
