= United States war crimes =

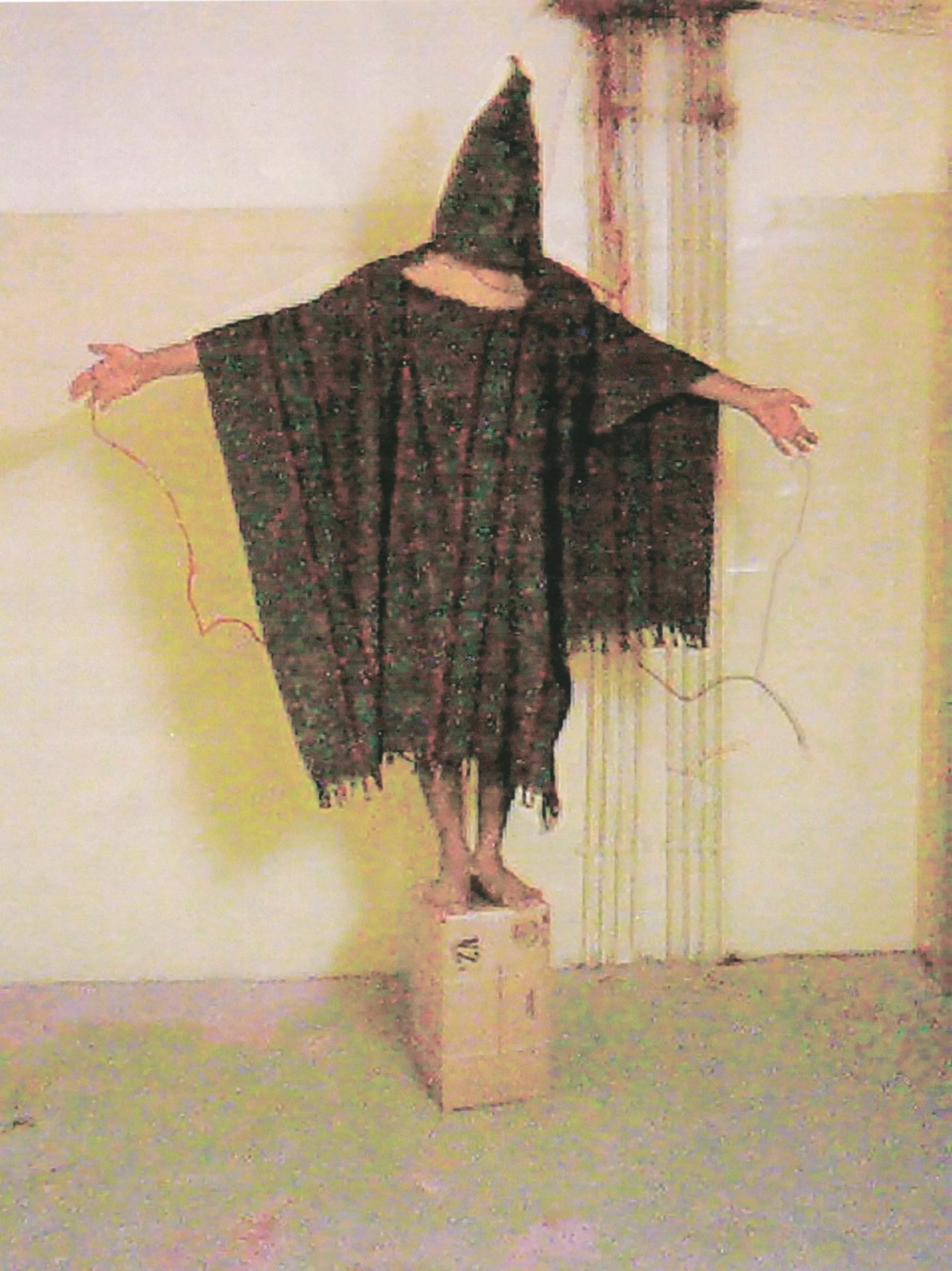
Picture of a prisoner subjected to torture and abuse by U.S. forces at Abu Ghraib prison in Iraq. The photo has become internationally famous, eventually making it onto the cover of The Economist.

This article contains a chronological list of incidents in the military history of the United States in which the U.S. Armed Forces and its members committed war crimes. Incidents include the summary execution of captured enemy combatants, the mistreatment of prisoners during interrogation, the use of torture, the use of violence against civilians and non-combatants, rape, and the unnecessary destruction of civilian property.

International law of war was first established with the Hague Conventions of 1899 and 1907 and the Geneva Conventions, to which the United States is a party. The United States prosecutes offenders through the War Crimes Act of 1996 as well as through articles in the Uniform Code of Military Justice. The United States signed the 1999 Rome Statute but it never ratified the treaty, taking the position that the International Criminal Court (ICC) lacks fundamental checks and balances. The American Service-Members' Protection Act of 2002 further limited US involvement with the ICC. The ICC reserves the right of states to prosecute war crimes, and the ICC can only proceed with prosecution of crimes when states do not have willingness or effective and reliable processes to investigate for themselves. The United States says that it has investigated many of the accusations alleged by the ICC prosecutors as having occurred in the War in Afghanistan, and thus does not accept ICC jurisdiction over its nationals.

== Definition ==
War crimes are defined as acts which violate the laws and customs of war established by the Hague Conventions of 1899 and 1907, or acts that are grave breaches of the Geneva Conventions and Additional Protocol I and Additional Protocol II. The Fourth Geneva Convention of 1949 extends the protection of civilians and prisoners of war during military occupation, even in the case where there is no armed resistance, for the period of one year after the end of hostilities, although the occupying power should be bound to several provisions of the convention as long as "such Power exercises the functions of government in such territory."

== Philippines ==
=== Killings of civilians ===
During the Philippine–American War (1899–1913), numerous war crimes were committed by the U.S. military against Filipino civilians. American soldiers and other witnesses sent letters home which described some of these atrocities; for example, in 1902, the Manila correspondent of the Philadelphia Ledger wrote:

The present war is no bloodless, opera bouffe engagement; our men have been relentless, have killed to exterminate men, women, children, prisoners and captives, active insurgents and suspected people from lads of ten up, the idea prevailing that the Filipino as such was little better than a dog...

In an editorial written by Clinton Coulter, published in the San Francisco Call in July 1899, he wrote that an "officer of the Oregon regiment", while being entertained at his home, told Colter that "Americans immediately upon entering a captured village would proceed to ransack every house, church, and even hold up the natives and procure everything of value, also that all the natives discovered coming toward the lines with a flag of truce were shot down." In 1899, the American Anti-Imperialist League published a pamphlet of letters which documented abuses against civilians by the U.S. Army and Marine Corps. A letter of a soldier from New York reported:

The town of Titatia was surrendered to us a few days ago, and two companies occupy the same. Last night one of our boys was found shot and his stomach cut open. Immediately orders were received from General Wheaton to burn the town and kill every native in sight; which was done to a finish. About 1,000 men, women and children were reported killed. I am probably growing hard-hearted, for I am in my glory when I can sight my gun on some dark skin and pull the trigger.

Corporal Sam Gillis stated:

We make everyone get into his house by seven p.m., and we only tell a man once. If he refuses we shoot him. We killed over 300 natives the first night. They tried to set the town on fire. If they fire a shot from the house we burn the house down and every house near it, and shoot the natives, so they are pretty quiet in town now.

During the war, desertion was a problem for the US Army. Seventeen American soldiers were sentenced to death for desertion, though only two were executed.

=== Samar Campaign ===
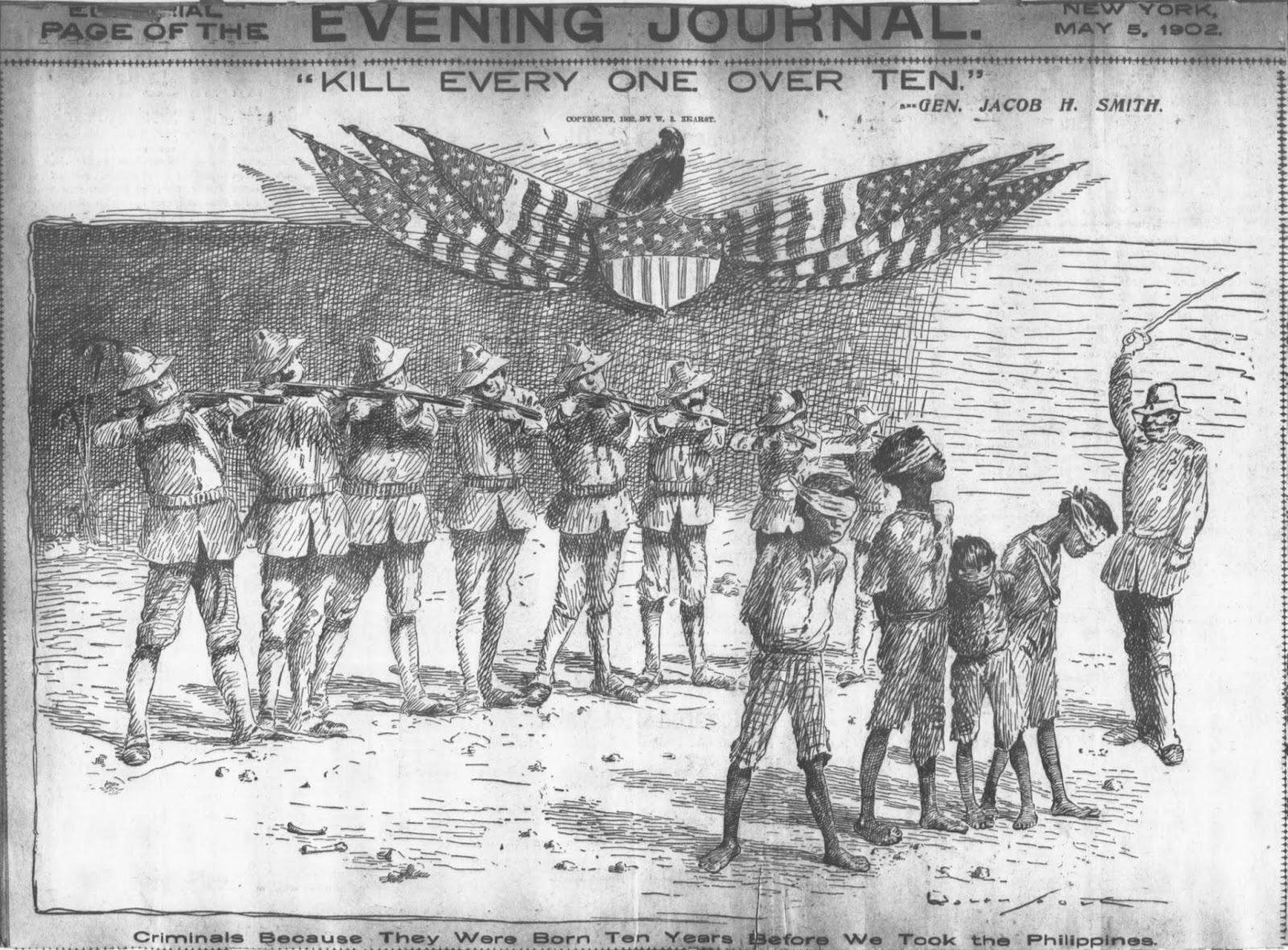
General Jacob H. Smith's infamous order "Kill Everyone Over Ten" was the caption in the New York Journal cartoon on 5 May 1902. The Old Glory draped an American shield on which a vulture replaced the bald eagle. The caption at the bottom proclaimed, "Criminals Because They Were Born Ten Years Before We Took the Philippines".

During the Pacification of Samar, Brigadier General Jacob H. Smith ordered Major Littleton Waller, commanding officer of a battalion of 315 U.S. Marines assigned to Smith's forces in Samar, to kill all persons "who are capable of bearing arms in actual hostilities" over the age of ten years old. The widespread massacre of Filipino civilians followed as American columns marched across the island. All food and all trade to Samar were cut off, and the widespread destruction of homes, crops, and draft animals occurred, with the intention of starving the Filipino revolutionaries and the civilian populace into submission. In a report, Waller stated that over an eleven-day period, his men burned 255 dwellings, shot 13 carabaos, and killed 39 people. An exhaustive research made by a British writer in the 1990s put the figure at about 2,500 dead. As a consequence of his order in Samar, Smith became known as "Howling Wilderness Smith". In May 1902, Smith was convicted at his court-martial in the United States not for murder or other war crimes, but for "conduct to the prejudice of good order and military discipline". The court-martial found him guilty and sentenced him "to be admonished by the reviewing authority." To appease outrage by American anti-imperialists, Smith was forced to retire.

=== Concentration camps ===
In late 1901, brigadier general James Franklin Bell took command of American operations in Batangas and Laguna provinces. In response to Filipino General Miguel Malvar's guerrilla warfare tactics, Bell employed counterinsurgency tactics, and all civilians were given identification papers and forced into concentration camps. In an attempt to counter negative reception in America, Colonel Arthur Wagner, the US Army's chief public relations officer, insisted General Bell's tactics intended to "protect friendly natives from the insurgents, and assure them an adequate food supply" while teaching them "proper sanitary standards". Wagner's assertion was undermined by a letter from a commander of one of the camps, who described them as "some suburb of Hell".

Civilians interred in the camps fell ill with a multitude of diseases, including cholera, beriberi, smallpox, and bubonic plague. Civilians also became subject to a curfew, after which all persons found outside of camps without identification could be shot on sight. Many men were rounded up for questioning, tortured, and summarily executed. Methods of torture such as waterboarding were frequently employed during interrogation, and entire villages were burned or otherwise destroyed.

Many Filipino prisoners also faced starvation; in one instance, according to a letter from a member of the United States Volunteers, 1,300 prisoners were executed in Batangas over a period of weeks after being forced to dig their own graves before being shot and killed by soldiers. The victims were members of the Katipunan society and the executions were justified in order to preserve food rations as keeping the prisoners alive would've forced the soldiers guarding them to be on low rations or even be starved.

Between January and April 1902, 8,350 people died in the camps out of a population of 298,000. Some camps experienced mortality rates as high as 20 percent. According to American historian Andrea Pitzer, Bell's reconcentration policy was directly responsible for over 11,000 deaths. Some have accused Bell of waging a war of extermination.

=== Moro Crater Massacre ===
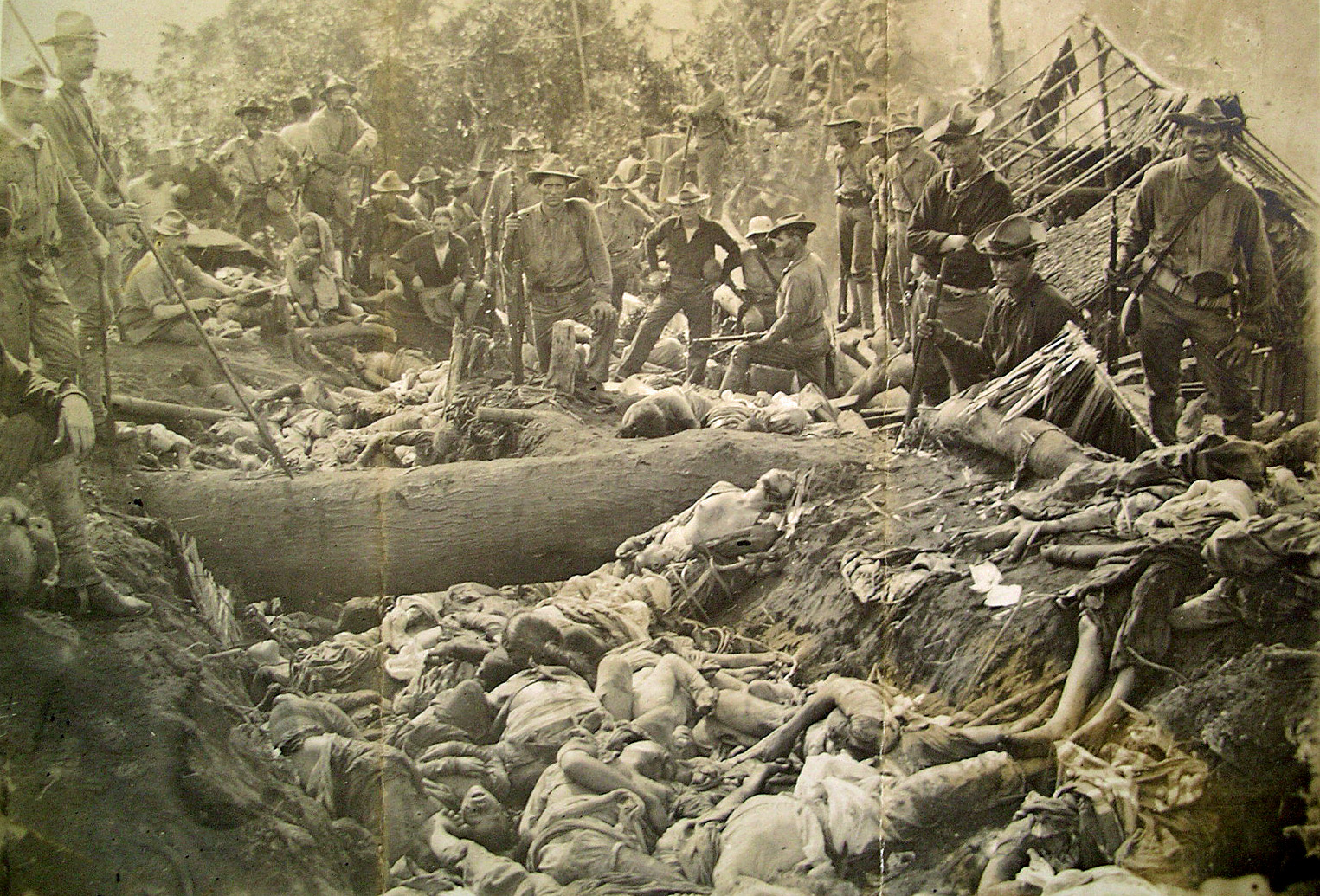
The aftermath of the First Battle of Bud Dajo, in which over 800 Moros were killed, including women and children

During the First Battle of Bud Dajo on 5–8, March 1906, General Leonard Wood ordered an assault by U.S. Marines on an encampment of Moros in the Bud Dajo crater, which was populated by 800 to 1,000 Tausug villagers. During the assault, Marines bombarded the crater with heavy artillery and machine-gun fire. By the end of the battle, only six Moros survived, with up to 99% of the villagers, much of them women and children, having been wiped out. Despite being an American victory, it was a massive public-relations disaster, and was criticized by numerous anti-imperialists at home. Author Mark Twain wrote of the massacre: "In what way was it a battle? It has no resemblance to a battle... We cleaned up our four days' work and made it complete by butchering these helpless people." Major Hugh Scott denounced General Wood's actions, stating that those who had fled to the crater were peaceful villagers and that they had, in Scott’s words, “declared they had no intention of fighting, ran up there only in fright, and had some crops planted and desired to cultivate them.”

General Wood responded to the public outcry by claiming that Moro fighters had used women and children as living shields during the assault, and that some women had dressed as men to join the fight. Philippine Governor-General Henry Clay Ide, however, gave a differing explanation, claiming that the high civilian casualties were collateral damage that resulted from the heavy artillery fire; these conflicting explanations only brought accusations of a cover-up, further adding to the criticism. According to historian Joshua Gedacht, the heavy civilian death toll can be attributed to indiscriminate machine-gun fire from a Maxim gun that had been placed to sweep the edge of the crater.

== Haiti ==
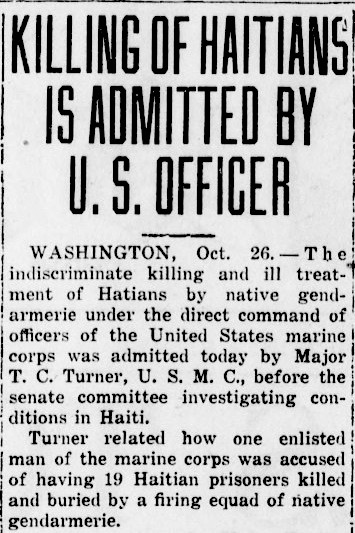
An October 1921 article from the Merced Sun-Star discussing killings of Haitians by U.S. commanded Haitian gendarmerie

During the First (1915) and Second (1918–1920) Caco Wars which were both waged during the United States occupation of Haiti (1915–1934), human rights abuses were committed against the native Haitian population. Overall, the United States Marine Corps and the Haitian gendarmerie killed several thousand Haitians during the rebellions between 1915 and 1920, though the exact death toll is unknown. During Senate hearings in 1921, the Commandant of the Marine Corps reported that, in 20 months of conflict, 2,250 Haitian rebels had been killed. However, in a report to the Secretary of the Navy, he reported a higher death toll of 3,250. Haitian historian Roger Gaillard, estimated that in total, including rebel combatants and civilians, at least 15,000 Haitians were killed during the occupation from 1915 to 1934. According to American anthropologist Paul Farmer, the higher estimates are not accepted by most historians outside Haiti.

Mass killings of civilians were allegedly committed by United States Marines and the Haitian gendarmerie. According to Haitian historian Roger Gaillard, human rights abuses included rape, lynchings, summary executions, burning villages and deaths by burning. Internal documents of the United States Army justified the killing of women and children, describing them as "auxiliaries" of the rebels. A private memorandum of the Secretary of the Navy criticized "indiscriminate killings against natives". Some American officers who were responsible for acts of violence were given Haitian Creole names including "Linx" for Commandant Freeman Lang and "Ouiliyanm" for Lieutenant Lee Williams. According to American journalist H.J. Seligman, Marines practiced "bumping off Gooks", which was the shooting of civilians in a manner similar to killing for sport.

During the Second Caco War of 1918–1919, many Caco prisoners were summarily executed by Marines and the gendarmerie on orders from their superiors. On 4 June 1916, Marines executed caco General Mizrael Codio and ten others after they were captured in Fonds-Verrettes. In Hinche in January 1919, Captain Ernest Lavoie of the gendarmerie allegedly ordered the killing of nineteen captured caco rebels according to American officers, though no charges were filed against him due to no physical evidence of the killing being presented.

The torture of rebels and civilians suspected of rebelling against the United States was commonly practiced by Marines. Some of the torture methods used included the use of water cure, hanging prisoners by their genitals, and ceps, which involved pushing both sides of the tibia with the butts of two rifles.

== World War II ==
=== Pacific theater ===
Japenese civilian fisherman strafed by USAAF P-51 Mustang machine-gun fire during the World War II Pacific theater, 1945

On 26 January 1943, the submarine USS Wahoo fired on survivors in lifeboats from the Imperial Japanese Army transport ship Buyo Maru. Vice Admiral Charles A. Lockwood asserted that the survivors were Japanese soldiers who had turned machine-gun and rifle fire on the Wahoo after it surfaced, and that such resistance was common in submarine warfare. According to the submarine's executive officer, the fire was intended to force the Japanese soldiers to abandon their boats and none of them were deliberately targeted. Historian Clay Blair stated that the submarine's crew fired first and the shipwrecked survivors returned fire with handguns. The survivors were later determined to have included Allied POWs of the British Indian Army's 2nd Battalion, 16th Punjab Regiment, who were guarded by Japanese Army Forces from the 26th Field Ordnance Depot. Of 1,126 men originally aboard Buyo Maru, 195 Indians and 87 Japanese died, some killed during the torpedoing of the ship and some killed by the shootings afterwards.

During and after the Battle of the Bismarck Sea (3–5 March 1943), U.S. PT boats and Allied aircraft attacked Japanese rescue vessels as well as approximately 1,000 survivors from eight sunken Japanese troop transport ships. The stated justification was that the Japanese personnel were close to their military destination and would be promptly returned to service in the battle. Many of the Allied aircrew accepted the attacks as necessary, while others were sickened.

American servicemen in the Pacific War deliberately killed Japanese soldiers who had surrendered, according to Richard Aldrich, a professor of history at the University of Nottingham. Aldrich published a study of diaries kept by United States and Australian soldiers, wherein it was stated that they sometimes massacred prisoners of war. According to John Dower, in "many instances ... Japanese who did become prisoners were killed on the spot or en route to prison compounds." According to Professor Aldrich, it was common practice for U.S. troops not to take prisoners. His analysis is supported by British historian Niall Ferguson, who also says that, in 1943, "a secret [U.S.] intelligence report noted that only the promise of ice cream and three days leave would ... induce American troops not to kill surrendering Japanese."

Ferguson states that such practices played a role in the ratio of Japanese prisoners to dead being 1:100 in late 1944. That same year, efforts were taken by Allied high commanders to suppress "take no prisoners" attitudes among their personnel (because it hampered intelligence gathering), and to encourage Japanese soldiers to surrender. Ferguson adds that measures by Allied commanders to improve the ratio of Japanese prisoners to Japanese dead resulted in it reaching 1:7, by mid-1945. Nevertheless, "taking no prisoners" was still "standard practice" among U.S. troops at the Battle of Okinawa, in April–June 1945. Ferguson also suggests that "it was not only the fear of disciplinary action or of dishonor that deterred German and Japanese soldiers from surrendering. More important for most soldiers was the perception that prisoners would be killed by the enemy anyway, and so one might as well fight on."

Ulrich Straus, a U.S. Japanologist, suggests that Allied troops on the front line intensely hated Japanese military personnel and were "not easily persuaded" to take or protect prisoners, because they believed that Allied personnel who surrendered got "no mercy" from the Japanese. Allied troops were told that Japanese soldiers were inclined to feign surrender in order to make surprise attacks, a practice which was outlawed by the Hague Convention of 1907. Therefore, according to Straus, "Senior officers opposed the taking of prisoners on the grounds that it needlessly exposed American troops to risks ..." When prisoners were taken at the Guadalcanal campaign, Army interrogator Captain Burden noted that many times POWs were shot during transport because "it was too much bother to take [them] in".

U.S. historian James J. Weingartner attributes the very low number of Japanese in U.S. prisoner of war compounds to two important factors, namely (1) a Japanese reluctance to surrender, and (2) a widespread American "conviction that the Japanese were 'animals' or 'subhuman' and unworthy of the normal treatment accorded to prisoners of war." The latter reason is supported by Ferguson, who says that "Allied troops often saw the Japanese in the same way that Germans regarded Russians—as Untermenschen (i.e., "subhuman")." Indeed, anti-Japanese racism was commonplace within the American military due, in part, to "yellow enemy" propaganda as well their experiences of Japanese brutality in combat; a poll of American soldiers from 1943 found that half of the respondents believed that the extermination of all Japanese people would be necessary to achieve peace. Hatred for the Japanese was far more extensive than hatred for the Germans, John Dower asserts that "Not until May 1945, when the Nazi death camps were exposed, did public horror and indignation against the Germans reach, at least in the United States, a pitch comparable to the feelings directed against the Japanese".

==== Mutilation of Japanese war dead ====
In the Pacific theater, American servicemen engaged in human trophy collecting. The phenomenon of "trophy-taking" was widespread enough that discussion of it featured prominently in magazines and newspapers. Franklin Roosevelt himself was reportedly given a gift of a letter-opener made of a Japanese soldier's arm by U.S. Representative Francis E. Walter in 1944, which Roosevelt later ordered to be returned, calling for its proper burial. The news was also widely reported to the Japanese public, where the Americans were portrayed as "deranged, primitive, racist and inhuman". This, compounded by a previous Life magazine picture of a young woman with a skull trophy, was reprinted in the Japanese media and presented as a symbol of American barbarism, causing national shock and outrage.

==== War rape ====
U.S. military personnel raped Okinawan women during the Battle of Okinawa in 1945.

Based on several years of research, Okinawan historian Oshiro Masayasu (former director of the Okinawa Prefectural Historical Archives) writes:

Soon after the U.S. Marines landed, all the women of a village on Motobu Peninsula fell into the hands of American soldiers. At the time, there were only women, children, and old people in the village, as all the young men had been mobilized for the war. Soon after landing, the Marines "mopped up" the entire village, but found no signs of Japanese forces. Taking advantage of the situation, they started 'hunting for women' in broad daylight, and women who were hiding in the village or nearby air raid shelters were dragged out one after another.

According to interviews carried out by The New York Times and published by them in 2000, several elderly people from an Okinawan village confessed that after the United States had won the Battle of Okinawa, three armed Marines kept coming to the village every week to force the villagers to gather all the local women, who were then carried off into the hills and raped. The article goes deeper into the matter and claims that the villagers' tale—true or not—is part of a "dark, long-kept secret" the unraveling of which "refocused attention on what historians say is one of the most widely ignored crimes of the war": "the widespread rape of Okinawan women by American servicemen." Although Japanese reports of rape were largely ignored at the time, one academic estimated that as many as 10,000 Okinawan women may have been raped. It has been claimed that the rape was so prevalent that most Okinawans over age 65 around the year 2000 either knew or had heard of a woman who was raped in the aftermath of the war.

Professor of East Asian Studies and expert on Okinawa, Steve Rabson, said: "I have read many accounts of such rapes in Okinawan newspapers and books, but few people know about them or are willing to talk about them." He notes that plenty of old local books, diaries, articles and other documents refer to rapes by American soldiers of various races and backgrounds. An explanation given for why the US military has no record of any rapes is that few Okinawan women reported abuse, mostly out of fear and embarrassment. According to an Okinawan police spokesman: "Victimized women feel too ashamed to make it public." Those who did report them are believed by historians to have been ignored by the U.S. military police. Many people wondered why it never came to light after the inevitable American-Japanese babies the many women must have given birth to. In interviews, historians and Okinawan elders said that some of those Okinawan women who were raped and did not commit suicide did give birth to biracial children, but that many of them were immediately killed or left behind out of shame, disgust or fearful trauma. More often, however, rape victims underwent crude abortions with the help of village midwives. A large scale effort to determine the possible extent of these crimes has never been conducted. Over five decades after the war had ended, in the late-1990s, the women who were believed to have been raped still overwhelmingly refused to give public statements, instead speaking through relatives and a number of historians and scholars.

There is substantial evidence that the U.S. had at least some knowledge of what was going on. Samuel Saxton, a retired captain, explained that the American veterans and witnesses may have intentionally kept the rape a secret, largely out of shame: "It would be unfair for the public to get the impression that we were all a bunch of rapists after we worked so hard to serve our country." Military officials formally denied the mass rapes, and all surviving related veterans refused request for interviews from The New York Times. Masaie Ishihara, a sociology professor, supports this: "There is a lot of historical amnesia out there, many people don't want to acknowledge what really happened." Author George Feifer noted in his book Tennozan: The Battle of Okinawa and the Atomic Bomb, that by 1946 there had been fewer than 10 reported cases of rape in Okinawa. He explained it was "partly because of shame and disgrace, partly because Americans were victors and occupiers. In all there were probably thousands of incidents, but the victims' silence kept rape another dirty secret of the campaign."

Some other authors have noted that Japanese civilians "were often surprised at the comparatively humane treatment they received from the American enemy." According to Islands of Discontent: Okinawan Responses to Japanese and American Power by Mark Selden, the Americans "did not pursue a policy of torture, rape, and murder of civilians as Japanese military officials had warned."

According to numerous academics, there were also 1,336 reported rapes during the first 10 days of the occupation of Kanagawa prefecture after the Japanese surrender, however, Brian Walsh states that this claim originated from a misreading of crime figures and that the Japanese Government had actually recorded 1,326 criminal incidents of all types involving American forces, of which an unspecified number were rapes.

=== European theater ===
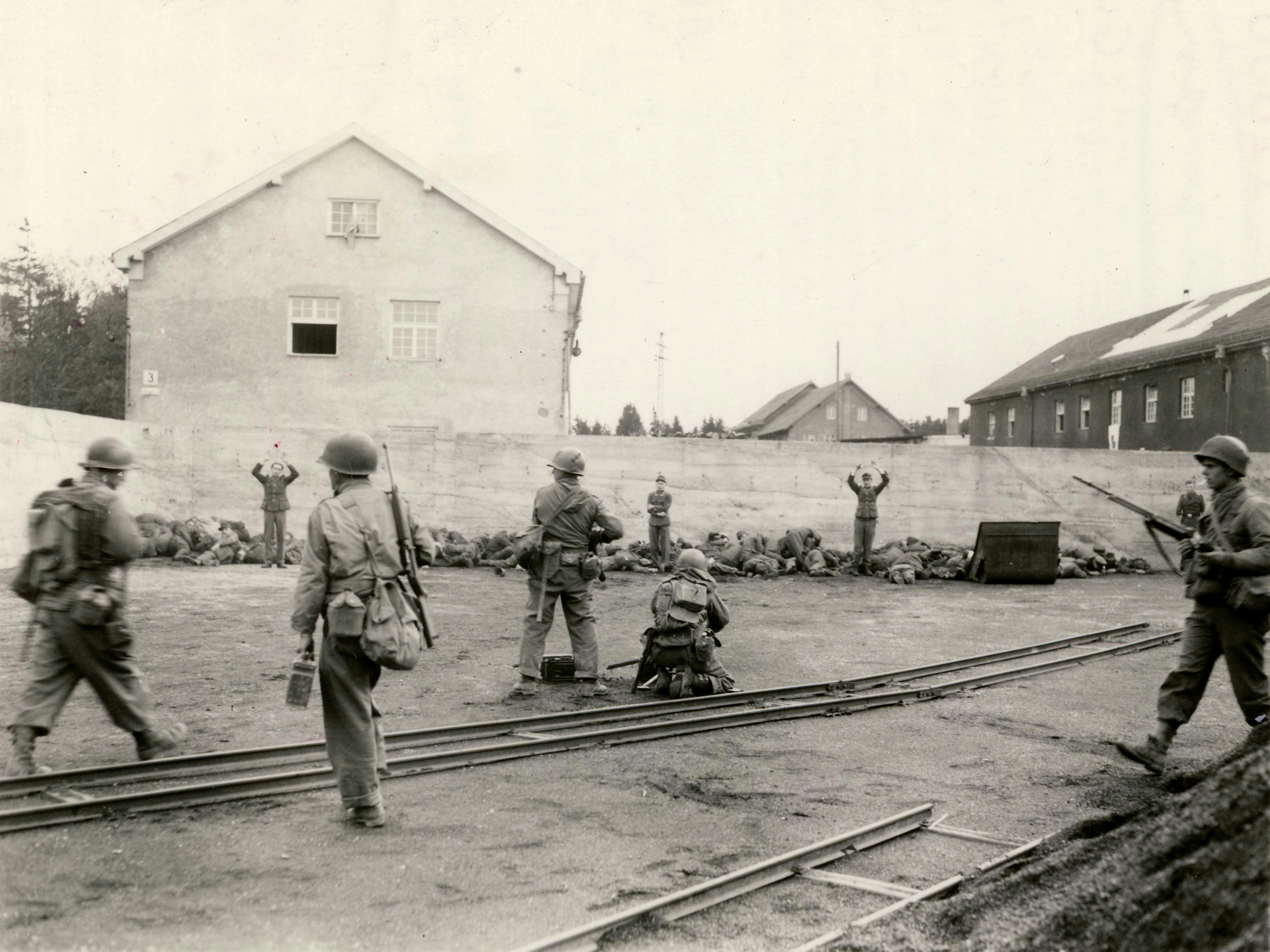
Soldiers of the U.S. Seventh Army guard SS prisoners in a coal yard at Dachau concentration camp during its liberation. 29 April 1945 (U.S. Army photograph) (Note: The caption for the photograph in the U.S. National Archives reads, "SC208765, Soldiers of the 42nd Infantry Division, U.S. Seventh Army, order SS men to come forward when one of their number tried to escape from the Dachau, Germany, concentration camp after it was captured by U.S. forces. Men on the ground in background feign death by falling as the guards fired a volley at the fleeing SS men. (157th Regt. 4/29/45).")

In the Laconia incident, U.S. aircraft attacked Germans rescuing survivors from the sinking British troopship in the Atlantic Ocean. Pilots of a United States Army Air Forces (USAAF) B-24 Liberator bomber, despite knowing the U-boat's location, intentions, and the presence of British seamen, killed dozens, possibly hundreds, of Laconia's survivors with bombs and strafing attacks, forcing U-156 to cast its remaining survivors into the sea and crash dive to avoid being destroyed.

During the Allied invasion of Sicily, some massacres of civilians by US troops were reported, including one in Vittoria, where 12 Italians were killed (including a 17-year-old boy), and in Piano Stella, where a group of peasants was murdered.

The Canicattì massacre involved the killing of Italian civilians by Lieutenant Colonel George Herbert McCaffrey; a confidential inquiry was made, but McCaffrey was never charged with any offense relating to the massacre. He died in 1954. This fact remained virtually unknown in the U.S. until 2005, when a witness, the father of Joseph S. Salemi of New York University reported it.

In the Biscari massacre, which consisted of two instances of mass murder, U.S. troops of the 45th Infantry Division killed 73 prisoners of war, mostly Italian. Only two soldiers were tried for the Biscari massacre, both of whom claimed in their defense that they were acting under orders from Patton not to take prisoners if enemy combatants continued to resist within two hundred yards of their position. Major General Everett Hughes, an old friend of Patton's, defended him, asserting that Patton had not "at any time advocated the destruction of prisoners of war under any circumstances". James J. Weingartner argues that Patton's innocence in inciting violence against prisoners of war is uncertain, stating that "The testimony of multiple witnesses indicated beyond a reasonable doubt that Patton had urged the killing of enemy troops who continued to resist at close quarters, even if they offered to surrender. Patton probably wished his troops to deny quarter or refuse to accept the surrender of enemy combatants who continued to resist at close range, itself a violation of the laws of war (although common practice) by the twentieth century, but it should not be surprising if some Americans concluded that they were authorized to kill resolute enemy soldiers after they had placed themselves under American control". No official action was taken against Patton for any complicity in the massacre.

According to an article in Der Spiegel by Klaus Wiegrefe, many personal memoirs of Allied soldiers have been wilfully ignored by historians until now because they were at odds with the Greatest Generation mythology surrounding World War II. However, this has recently started to change, with books such as The Day of Battle, by Rick Atkinson, in which he describes Allied war crimes in Italy, and D-Day: The Battle for Normandy, by Antony Beevor. Beevor's latest work suggests that Allied war crimes in Normandy were much more extensive "than was previously realized".

Historian Peter Lieb has found that many U.S. and Canadian units were ordered not to take enemy prisoners during the D-Day landings in Normandy. If this view is correct, it may explain the fate of 64 German prisoners (out of the 130 captured) who did not make it to the POW collecting point on Omaha Beach on the day of the landings.

Near the French village of Audouville-la-Hubert, 30 Wehrmacht prisoners were massacred by U.S. paratroopers.

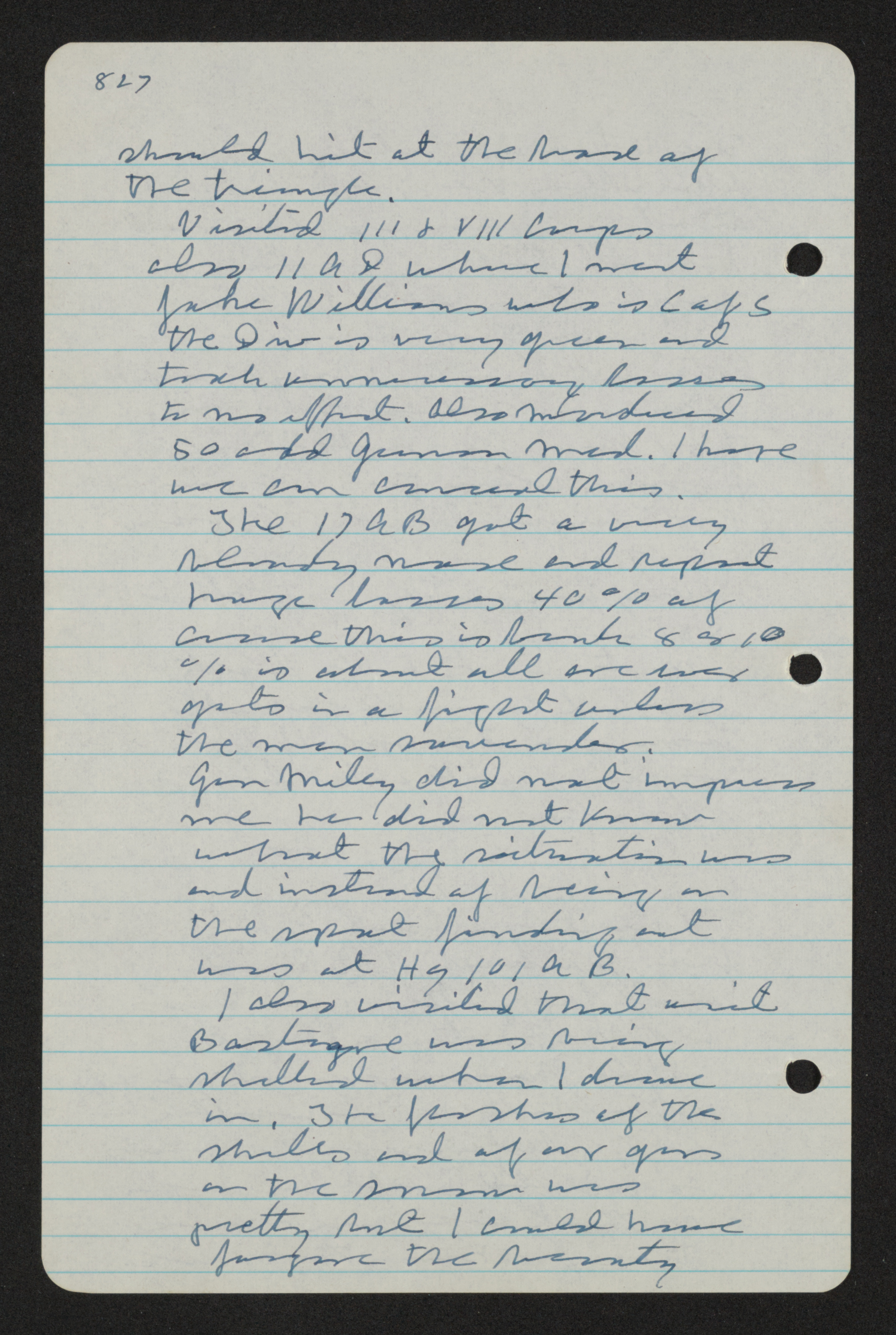
George S. Patton's war diary entry from 4 January 1945. Regarding the Chenogne massacre on 1 January 1945 Patton noted: "Also murdered 50 odd German med [ics']. I hope we can conceal this."

In the aftermath of the 1944 Malmedy massacre, in which 80 American POWs were murdered by their German captors, a written order from the headquarters of the 328th U.S. Army Infantry Regiment, dated 21 December 1944, stated: "No SS troops or paratroopers will be taken prisoner but [rather they] will be shot on sight." Major-General Raymond Hufft (U.S. Army) gave instructions to his troops not to take prisoners when they crossed the Rhine in 1945. "After the war, when he reflected on the war crimes he authorized, he admitted, 'if the Germans had won, I would have been on trial at Nuremberg instead of them.'" Stephen Ambrose related: "I've interviewed well over 1000 combat veterans. Only one of them said he shot a prisoner ... Perhaps as many as one-third of the veterans...however, related incidents in which they saw other GIs shooting unarmed German prisoners who had their hands up."

In the Chenogne massacre during the Battle of the Bulge on 1 January 1945, members of the 11th Armored Division killed an estimated 80 German prisoners of war, which were assembled in a field and shot with machine guns. The events were covered up at the time, and none of the perpetrators were ever punished. Postwar historians believe the killings were carried out on verbal orders by senior commanders that "no prisoners were to be taken". General George S. Patton confirmed in his diary that the Americans "...also murdered 50 odd German med [ics']. I hope we can conceal this".

Operation Teardrop involved eight surviving captured crewmen from the sunken German submarine U-546 being tortured by U.S. military personnel. Historian Philip K. Lundeberg has written that the beating and torture of U-546's survivors was a singular atrocity motivated by the interrogators' need to quickly get information on what the U.S. believed were potential missile attacks on the contiguous United States by German submarines.

James J. Weingartner identifies what he views as a disparity in treatment between American and German war crimes in the court martial of American soldiers and the post-war trials of Germans, arguing that United States war crimes were judged "by a more indulgent standard" than comparable German atrocities, particularly in regard to the principle of following orders.

Among American WWII veterans who admitted to having committed war crimes was former Mafia hitman Frank Sheeran. In interviews with his biographer Charles Brandt, Sheeran recalled his war service with the Thunderbird Division as the time when he first developed a callousness to the taking of human life. By his own admission, Sheeran participated in numerous massacres and summary executions of German POWs, acts which violated the Hague Conventions of 1899 and 1907 and the 1929 Geneva Convention on POWs. In his interviews with Brandt, Sheeran divided such massacres into four different categories.

1. Revenge killings in the heat of battle. Sheeran told Brandt that, when a German Army soldier had just killed his close friends and then tried to surrender, he would often "send him to hell, too." He described often witnessing similar behavior by fellow GIs.
2. Orders from unit commanders during a mission. When describing his first murder for organized crime, Sheeran recalled: "It was just like when an officer would tell you to take a couple of German prisoners back behind the line and for you to 'hurry back'. You did what you had to do."
3. The Dachau massacre and other reprisal killings of concentration camp guards and trustee inmates.
4. Calculated attempts to dehumanize and degrade German POWs. While Sheeran's unit was climbing the Harz Mountains, they came upon a Wehrmacht mule train carrying food and drink up the mountainside. The female cooks were first allowed to leave unmolested, then Sheeran and his fellow GIs "ate what we wanted and soiled the rest with our waste." Then the Wehrmacht mule drivers were given shovels and ordered to "dig their own shallow graves." Sheeran later joked that they did so without complaint, likely hoping that he and his buddies would change their minds. But the mule drivers were shot and buried in the holes they had dug. Sheeran explained that by then, "I had no hesitation in doing what I had to do."

Elements of Sheeran's reasoning are supported by historian James J. Weingartner. Weingartner states that "Prisoners were killed in reprisal for real or imagined atrocities, for the utilitarian reason that keeping them was impractical or inconvenient, or out of frustration with a war that was going badly or was being unnecessarily prolonged by the enemy. Civilians often fell victim to the fury of ground combatants, particularly in situations where occupying forces were real or imagined objects of guerilla warfare".

==== Rape ====
Secret wartime files made public only in 2006 reveal that American GIs committed 400 sexual offenses in Europe, including 126 rapes in England, between 1942 and 1945. A study by Robert J. Lilly estimates that a total of 14,000 civilian women in England, France and Germany were raped by American GIs during World War II. He estimates that there were around 3,500 rapes by American servicemen in France between June 1944 and the end of the war. Historian William Hitchcock states that sexual violence against women in liberated France was common.

== Korean War ==
=== Bombing of North Korea ===
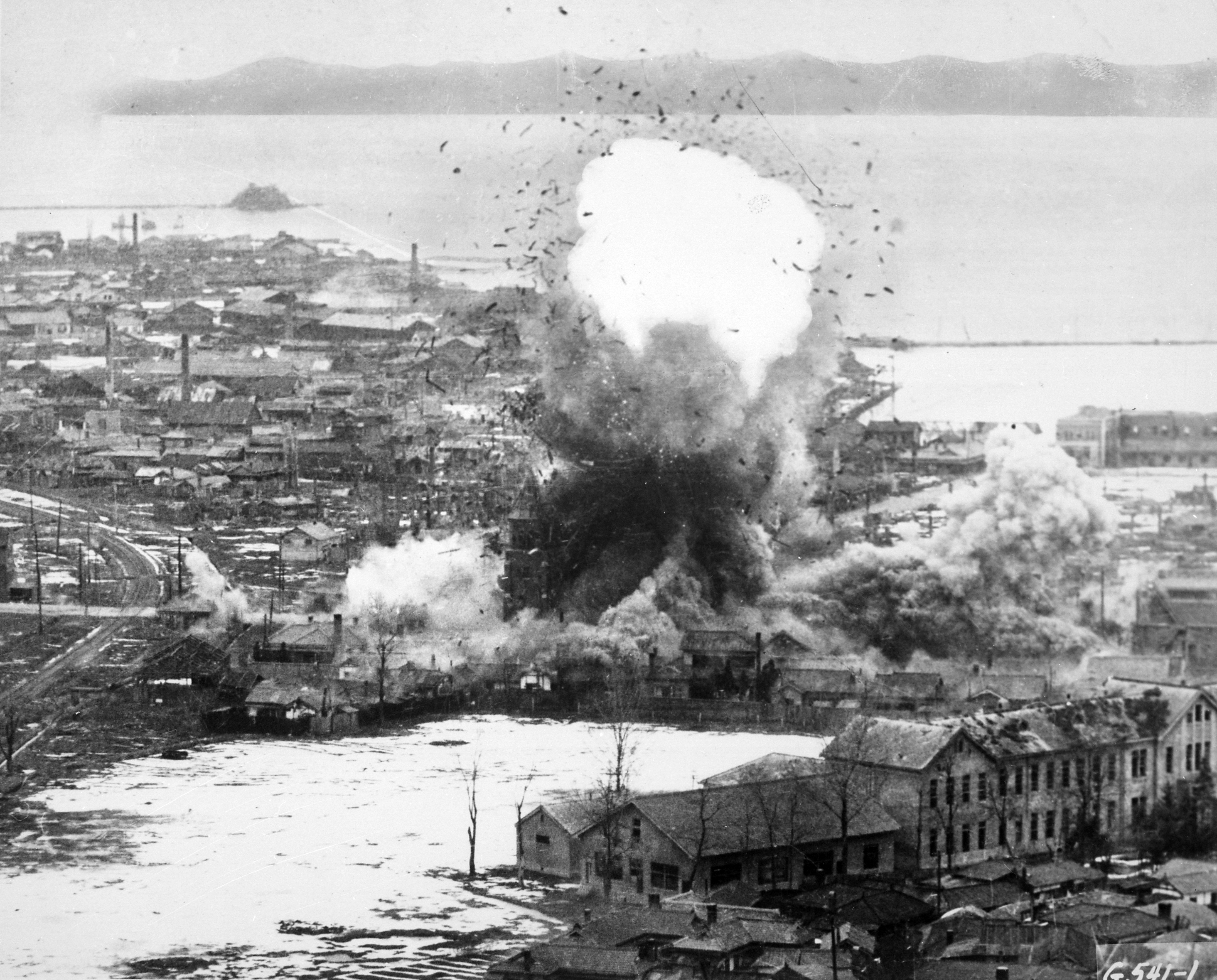
Wonsan under attack by B-26 bombers from the U.S. Air Force, 1951

The U.S. bombing of North Korea during the Korean War has been condemned as a war crime by various authors. According to journalist Max Fisher, the U.S. bombing campaign "often deliberately targeted civilian as well as military targets". Historian Bruce Cumings has likened the bombings to a genocide, stating, "What hardly any Americans know or remember is that we carpet-bombed the north for three years with next to no concern for civilian casualties." Author Blaine Harden has called the bombing campaign a "major war crime."

On 13 May 1953, the U.S. Air Force destroyed five North Korean dams causing widespread flooding and destruction to farmlands. According to Charles K. Armstrong, the flooding threatened several million North Koreans with starvation and "only emergency assistance from China, the USSR, and other socialist countries prevented widespread famine." A 1954 article from the Air and Space Power Journal, the principal journal of the Department of the United States Air Force, reported that:

"Toksan strike and similar attacks on the Chasan, Kuwonga, Kusong, and Toksang dams... [were] furnishing 75 per cent of the controlled water supply for North Korea’s rice production" and that "to the Communists the smashing of the dams meant primarily the destruction of their chief sustenance—rice. The Westerner can little conceive the awesome meaning which the loss of this staple food commodity has for the Asian—starvation and slow death. 'Rice famine,' for centuries the chronic scourge of the Orient, is more feared than the deadliest plague.... The irrigation dam attacks, though small in scale and relatively unimportant strategically in comparison to what could have been exerted against 20 dams instead of 5, gave the enemy a sample of the totality of war that an air strategy makes possible–a totality embracing the whole of a nation’s economy and its people..."

Stephen Endicott, Edward Hagerman, Bruce Cumings, Herbert Bix, and Noam Chomsky argue that these actions are war crimes according to international law. Sandra Wilson argues that one of the reasons that U.S. authorities did not pursue legal war crime cases against North Korean leaders, despite much legal preparation, was because the "moral standing of the West, and hence its authority to run trials, was undermined by the large number of atrocities committed by the United Nations side."

A 2001 report by The Chosun Ilbo claims that approximately 282,000 North Korean civilians died during the bombing campaign, citing a report by Soviet ambassador to Korea V. N. Razuvaev. General Curtis LeMay, who was head of the Strategic Air Command during the war, stated in a 1988 interview to Air Force historians that "Over a period of three years or so we killed off, what, 20 percent of the population of Korea, as direct casualties of war or from starvation and exposure?"

=== No Gun Ri massacre ===
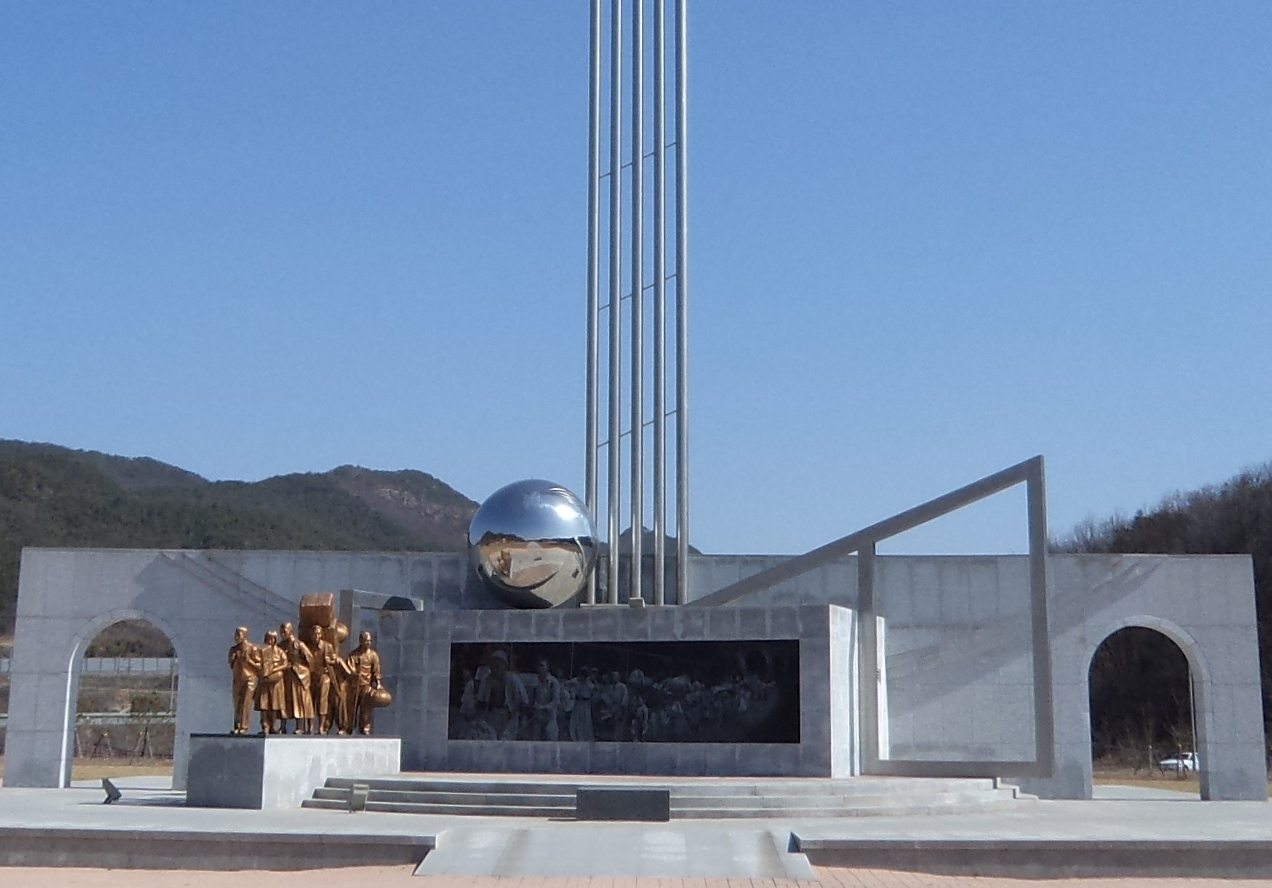
The Memorial Tower to the victims of the No Gun Ri massacre

The No Gun Ri massacre refers to an incident of mass killing of an undetermined number of South Korean refugees by U.S. soldiers of the 7th Cavalry Regiment under the command of General Hobart R. Gay, between 26 and 29 July 1950 at a railroad bridge near the village of Nogeun-ri, 100 miles (160 km) southeast of Seoul. In 2005, the South Korean government certified the names of 163 dead or missing (mostly women, children, and old men) and 55 wounded. It said that many other victims' names were not reported. The South Korean government-funded No Gun Ri Peace Foundation estimated in 2011 that 250–300 were killed. Over the years survivors' estimates of the dead have ranged from 300 to 500. This episode early in the Korean War gained widespread attention when the Associated Press (AP) published a series of articles in 1999 that subsequently won a Pulitzer Prize for Investigative Reporting.

=== Project Artichoke ===
During the war, the CIA conducted interrogation and brainwashing experiments on some North Korean and Chinese prisoners of war as part of Project Artichoke, which was launched by the Office of Scientific Intelligence under the direction of Brigadier General Paul F. Gaynor. In October 1950, 25 unnamed North Korean POWs were selected by the U.S. Government to receive "advanced" interrogation techniques with the intent of "controlling an individual to the point where he will do our bidding against his will". Prisoners were subjected to hypnosis experiments as well as forced addiction to and withdrawals from substances such as LSD, in an attempt to produce amnesia so the subjects could be made to perform unwilling acts, such as assassinations. Subjects were also purposely infected with a number of diseases such as dengue fever in hopes that said viruses could be used as potential incapacitating agents.

== Vietnam War ==
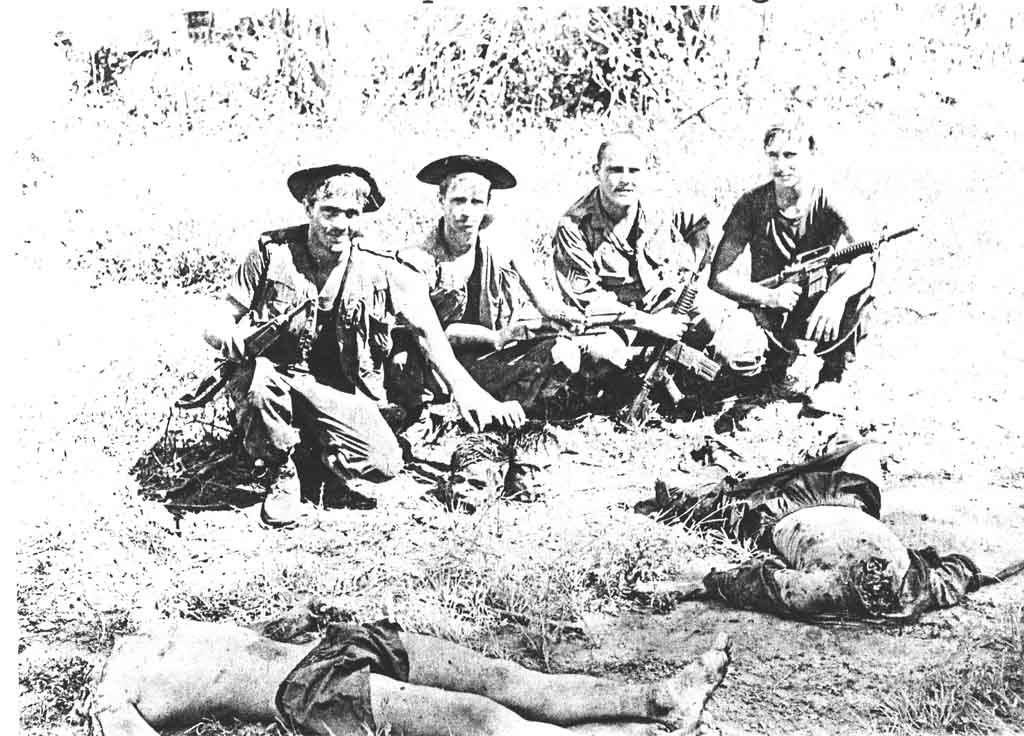
Original caption from Vietnam GI: "The above picture shows exactly what the brass want you to do in the Nam. The reason for printing this picture is not to put down G.I.’s but rather to illustrate the fact that the Army can really fuck over your mind if you let it. It’s up to you, you can put in your time just trying to make it back in one piece or you can become a psycho like the Lifer (E-6) in the picture who really digs this kind of shit. It’s your choice."

RJ Rummel estimated that American forces killed around 5,500 people in democide between 1960 and 1972 in the Vietnam War, from a range of between 4,000 and 10,000. Benjamin Valentino estimates 110,000–310,000 deaths as a "possible case" of "counter-guerrilla mass killings" by U.S. and South Vietnamese forces during the war.

During the war, 95 U.S. Army personnel and 27 U.S. Marine Corps personnel were convicted by court-martial of the murder or manslaughter of Vietnamese.

U.S. forces also established numerous free-fire zones as a tactic to prevent Viet Cong fighters from sheltering in South Vietnamese villages. Such practice, which involved the assumption that any individual appearing in the designated zones was an enemy combatant that could be freely targeted by weapons, is regarded by journalist Lewis M. Simons as "a severe violation of the laws of war". Nick Turse, in his 2013 book, Kill Anything that Moves, argues that a relentless drive toward higher body counts, a widespread use of free-fire zones, rules of engagement where civilians who ran from soldiers or helicopters could be viewed as Viet Cong and a widespread disdain for Vietnamese civilians led to massive civilian casualties and endemic war crimes inflicted by U.S. troops.

Within free-fire zones, Australian correspondent Tim Bowden noted that American forces would routinely disregard the lives of locals, including forcing civilians to clear potential minefields, destroying property and religious sites, calling airstrikes and artillery on non-military targets, and observed casual disregard for human lives. These actions undermined trust and support in the government of South Vietnam.

=== My Lai massacre ===
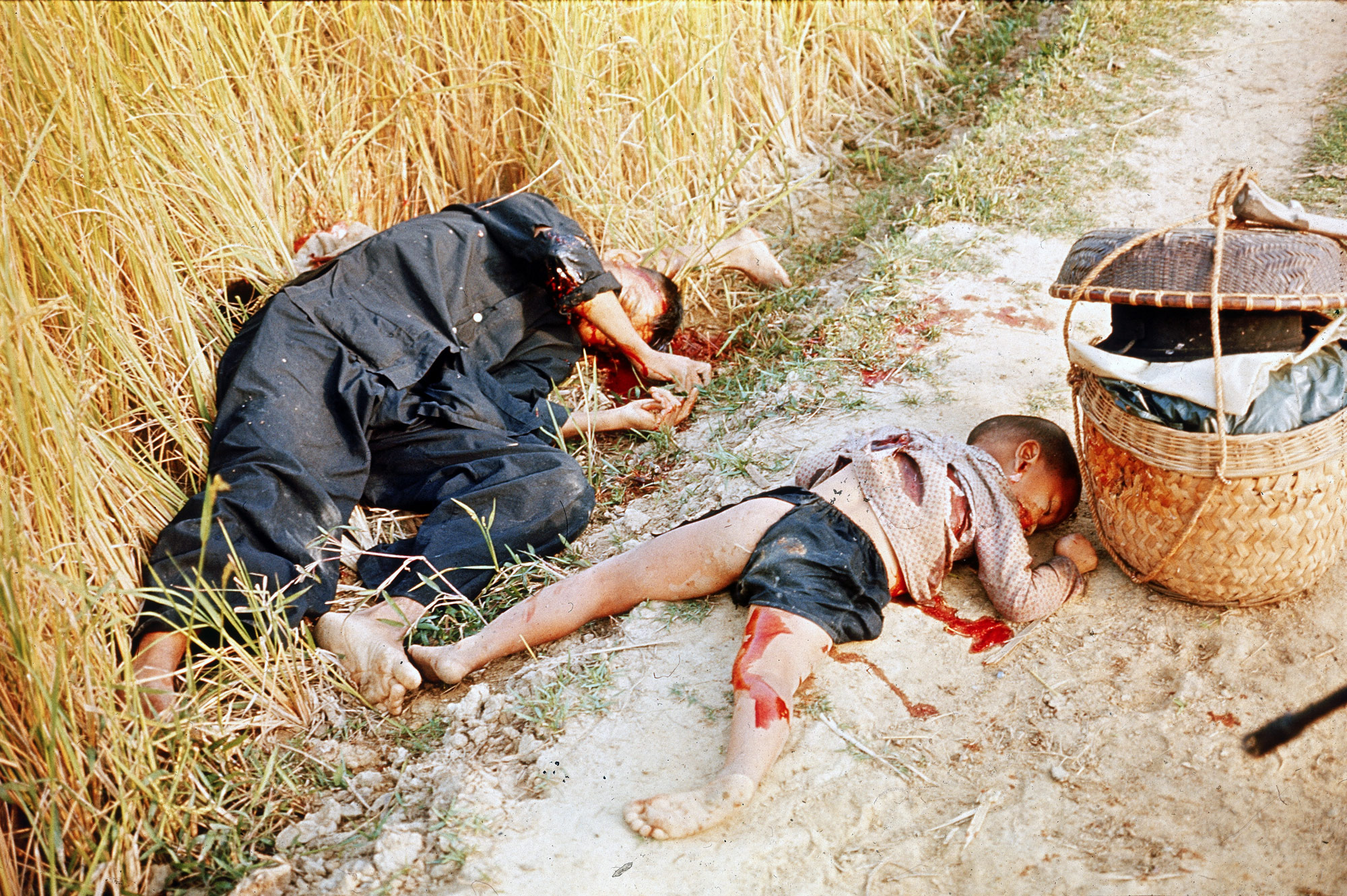
Bodies of some of the hundreds of Vietnamese civilians who were killed by U.S. soldiers during the My Lai massacre

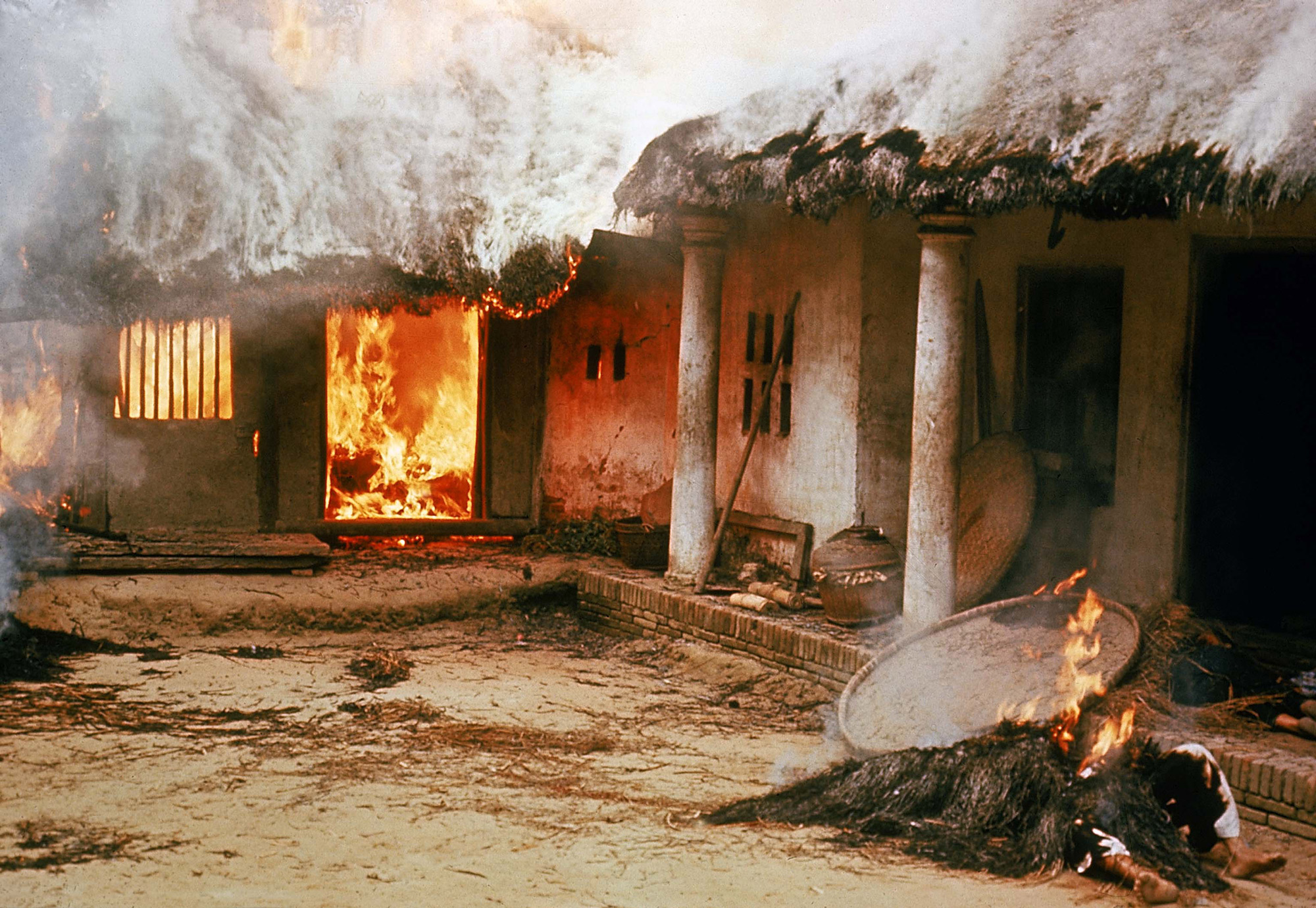
Dead bodies outside a burning dwelling in My Lai

The My Lai massacre was the mass murder of 347 to 504 unarmed citizens in South Vietnam, almost entirely civilians, most of them women and children, conducted by U.S. soldiers from the Company C of the 1st Battalion, 20th Infantry Regiment, 11th Brigade of the 23rd (American) Infantry Division, on 16 March 1968. Some of the victims were raped, beaten, tortured, or maimed, and some of the bodies were found mutilated. The massacre took place in the hamlets of Mỹ Lai and My Khe of Sơn Mỹ village during the Vietnam War. Of the 26 U.S. soldiers initially charged with criminal offenses or war crimes for actions at My Lai, only William Calley was convicted. Initially sentenced to life in prison, Calley had his sentence reduced to ten years, then was released after only three and a half years under house arrest. The incident prompted widespread outrage around the world, and reduced U.S. domestic support for the Vietnam War. Three American Servicemen (Hugh Thompson, Jr., Glenn Andreotta, and Lawrence Colburn), who made an effort to halt the massacre and protect the wounded, were sharply criticized by U.S. Congressmen, and received hate mail, death threats, and mutilated animals on their doorsteps. Thirty years after the event their efforts were honored.

Following the massacre a Pentagon task force called the Vietnam War Crimes Working Group (VWCWG) investigated alleged atrocities by U.S. troops against South Vietnamese civilians and created a formerly secret archive of some 9,000 pages (the Vietnam War Crimes Working Group Files housed by the National Archives and Records Administration) documenting 320 alleged incidents from 1967 to 1971 including 7 massacres (not including the My Lai massacre) in which at least 137 civilians died; 78 additional attacks targeting noncombatants in which at least 57 were killed, 56 wounded and 15 sexually assaulted; and 141 incidents of U.S. soldiers torturing civilian detainees or prisoners of war. 203 U.S. personnel were charged with crimes, 57 were court-martialed and 23 were convicted. The VWCWG also investigated over 500 additional alleged atrocities but could not verify them.

=== Operation Speedy Express ===
Operation Speedy Express was a controversial military operation aimed at pacifying large parts of the Mekong delta from December 1968 to May 1969. The U.S. Army claimed 10,899 PAVN/VC were killed in the operation, while the U.S. Army Inspector General estimated that there were 5,000 to 7,000 civilian deaths from the operation. Robert Kaylor of United Press International alleged that according to American pacification advisers in the Mekong Delta during the operation the division had indulged in the "wanton killing" of civilians through the "indiscriminate use of mass firepower."

=== Phoenix Program ===
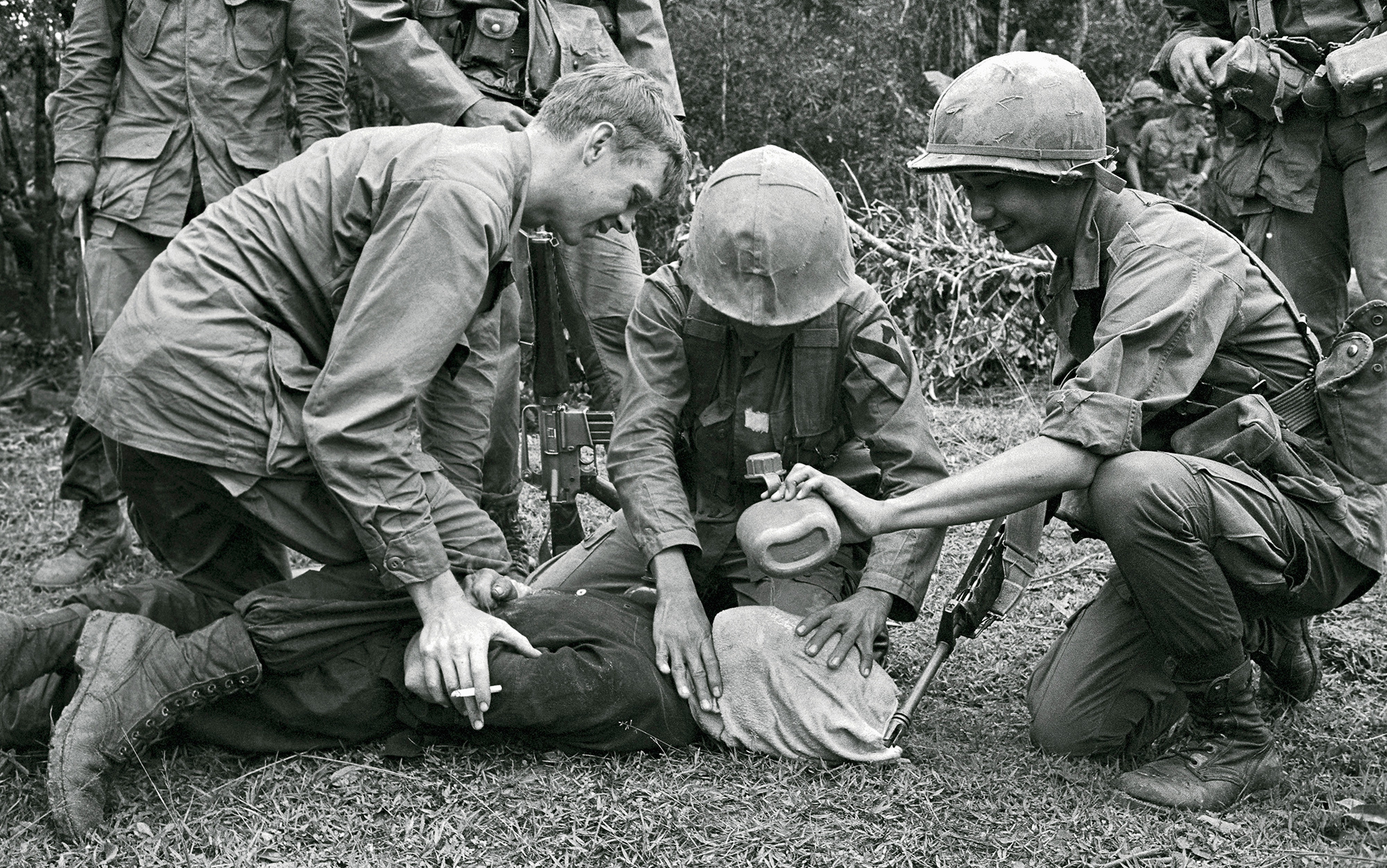
Two United States soldiers and one South Vietnamese soldier waterboard a captured North Vietnamese prisoner of war near Da Nang, 1968.

The Phoenix Program was coordinated by the CIA, involving South Vietnamese, U.S. and other allied security forces, with the aim identifying and destroying the Viet Cong (VC) through infiltration, torture, capture, counter-terrorism, interrogation, and assassination. The program was heavily criticized, with critics labeling it a "civilian assassination program" and criticizing the operation's use of torture.

=== Tiger Force ===
Tiger Force was the name of a long-range reconnaissance patrol unit of the 1st Battalion (Airborne), 327th Infantry, 1st Brigade (Separate), 101st Airborne Division, which fought from November 1965 to November 1967. The unit gained notoriety after investigations during the course of the war and decades afterwards revealed extensive war crimes against civilians, which numbered into the hundreds. They were accused of routine torture, execution of prisoners of war and the intentional killing of civilians. U.S. army investigators concluded that many of the alleged war crimes took place.

=== Other incidents ===
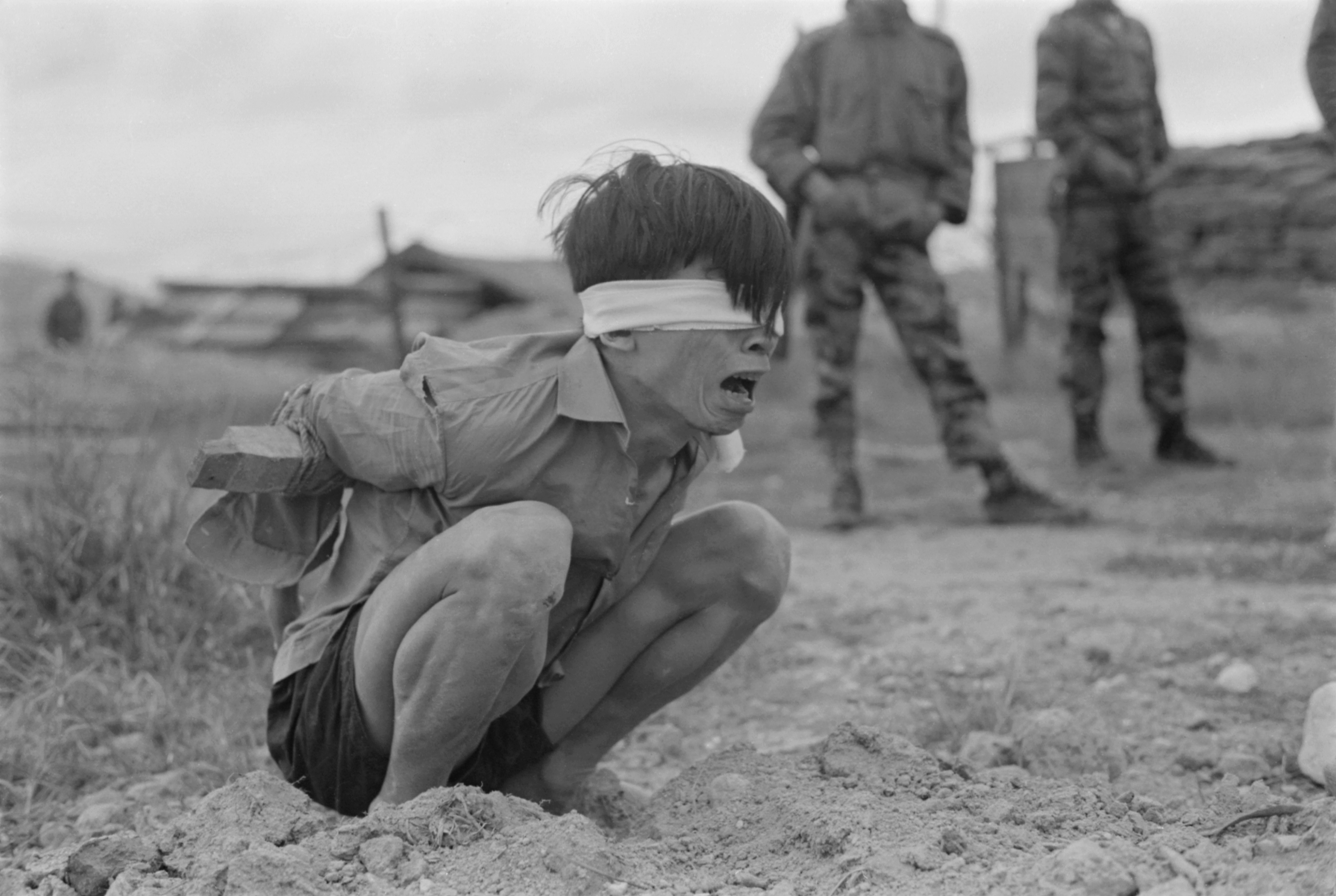
Captured Viet Cong soldier blindfolded and tied in a stress position, 1967

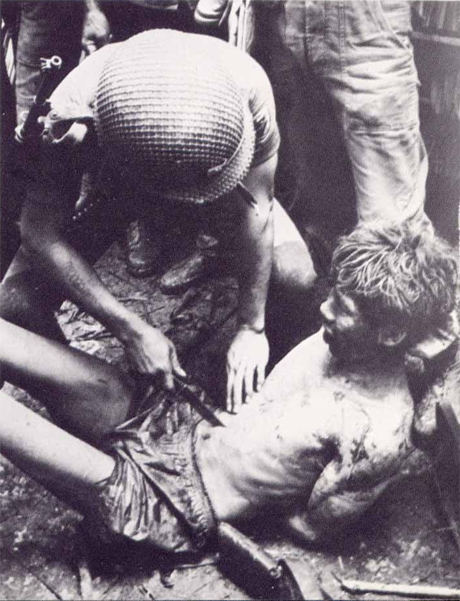
Attrocities against prisoners, Vietnam

On 12 August 1965 Lcpl McGhee of Company M, 3rd Battalion, 3rd Marines, walked through Marine lines at Chu Lai Base Area toward a nearby village. In answer to a Marine sentry's shouted question, he responded that he was going after a VC. Two Marines were dispatched to retrieve McGhee and as they approached the village they heard a shot and a woman's scream and then saw McGhee walking toward them from the village. McGhee said he had just killed a VC and other VC were following him. At trial Vietnamese prosecution witnesses testified that McGhee had kicked through the wall of the hut where their family slept. He seized a 14-year-old girl and pulled her toward the door. When her father interceded, McGhee shot and killed him. Once outside the house the girl escaped McGhee with the help of her grandmother. McGhee was found guilty of unpremeditated murder and sentenced to confinement at hard labor for ten years. On appeal this was reduced to 7 years and he actually served 6 years and 1 month.

On 23 September 1966, a nine-man ambush patrol from the 1st Battalion, 5th Marines, left Hill 22, northwest of Chu Lai. Private First Class John D. Potter, Jr. took effective command of the patrol. They entered the hamlet of Xuan Ngoc (2) and seized Dao Quang Thinh, whom they accused of being a Viet Cong, and dragged him from his hut. While they beat him, other patrol members forced his wife, Bui Thi Huong, from their hut and four of them raped her. A few minutes later three other patrol members shot Dao Quang Thinh, Bui, their child, Bui's sister-in-law, and her sister in- law's child. Bui Thi Huong survived to testify at the courts-martial. The company commander suspicious of the reported "enemy contact" sent Second Lieutenant Stephen J. Talty, to return to the scene with the patrol. Once there, Talty realized what had happened and attempted to cover up the incident. A wounded child was discovered alive and Potter bludgeoned them to death with his rifle. Potter was convicted of premeditated murder and rape, and sentenced to confinement at hard labor for life, but was released in February 1978, having served 12 years and 1 month. Hospitalman John R. Bretag testified against Potter and was sentenced to 6 month's confinement for rape. PFC James H. Boyd, Jr., pleaded guilty to murder and was sentenced to 4 years confinement at hard labor. Sergeant Ronald L. Vogel was convicted for murder of one of the children and rape and was sentenced to 50 years confinement at hard labor, which was reduced on appeal to 10 years, of which he served 9 years. Two patrol members were acquitted of major charges, but were convicted of assault with intent to commit rape and sentenced to 6 months' confinement. Lt Talty was found guilty of making a false report and dismissed from the Marine Corps, but this was overturned on appeal.

PFC Charles W. Keenan was convicted of murder by firing at point-blank range into an unarmed, elderly Vietnamese woman, and an unarmed Vietnamese man. His life sentence was reduced to 25 years confinement. Upon appeal, the conviction for the woman's murder was dismissed and confinement was reduced to five years. Later clemency action further reduced his confinement to 2 years and 9 months. Corporal Stanley J. Luczko, was found guilty of voluntary manslaughter and sentenced to confinement for three years.

From 31 January to 1 February 1967, 145 civilians were purported to have been killed by Company H, 2nd Battalion, 1st Marines, during the Thuy Bo incident. Marine accounts record 101 Viet Cong and 22 civilians killed during a 2-day battle.

On 5 May 1968, Lcpl Denzil R. Allen led a six-man ambush patrol from the 1st Battalion, 27th Marines near Huế. They stopped and interrogated two unarmed Vietnamese men who Allen and Private Martin R. Alvarez then executed. After an attack on their base that night the unit sent out a patrol who brought back three Vietnamese men. Allen, Alvarez, Lance Corporals John D. Belknap, James A. Maushart, PFC Robert J. Vickers, and two others then formed a firing squad and executed two of the Vietnamese. The third captive was taken into a building where Allen, Belknap, and Anthony Licciardo, Jr., hanged him, when the rope broke Allen cut the man's throat, killing him. Allen pleaded guilty to five counts of unpremeditated murder and was sentenced to confinement at hard labor for life reduced to 20 years in exchange for the guilty plea. Allen's confinement was reduced to 7 years and he was paroled after having served only 2 years and 11 months confinement. Maushart pleaded guilty to one count of unpremeditated murder and was sentenced to 2 years confinement of which he served 1 year and 8 months. Belknap and Licciardo each pleaded guilty to single murders and were sentenced to 2 years confinement. Belknap served 15 months while Licciardo served his full sentence. Alvarez was found to lack mental responsibility and found not guilty. Vickers was found guilty of two counts of unpremeditated murder, but his convictions were overturned on review.

On the morning of 1 March 1969 an eight-man Marine ambush was discovered by three Vietnamese girls, aged about 13, 17, and 19, and a Vietnamese boy, about 11. The four shouted their discovery to those being observed by the ambush. Seized by the Marines, the four were bound, gagged, and led away by Corporal Ronald J. Reese and Lance Corporal Stephen D. Crider. Minutes later, the 4 children were seen, apparently dead, in a small bunker. The Marines tossed a fragmentation grenade into the bunker, which then collapsed the damaged structure atop the bodies. Reese and Crider were each convicted of four counts of murder and sentenced to confinement at hard labor for life. On appeal both sentences were reduced to 3 years confinement.

On 19 February 1970, during the Son Thang massacre, 16 unarmed women and children were killed in the Son Thang Hamlet by Company B, 1st Battalion, 7th Marines. One person was sentenced to life in prison, another sentenced to 5 years, but both sentences were reduced to less than a year. One of the perpetrators committed suicide in 1976.

On 2 June 1971, Brigadier General John W. Donaldson was charged with the murder of six Vietnamese civilians but was acquitted due to lack of evidence. In 13 separate incidents Donaldson was alleged to have flown over civilian areas shooting at civilians. He was the first U.S. general charged with war crimes since General Jacob H. Smith in 1902 and the highest ranking American to be accused of war crimes during the Vietnam War. The charges were dropped due to lack of evidence.

Marine Corps Corporal Bill Hatton admitted that when he was in Đông Hà and Quảng Trị as part of an engineer maintenance platoon that he and his fellow American soldiers fed Vietnamese children peanut butter crackers laced with trioxane fuel tablets, which were used to heat rations. Trioxane is toxic and corrosive in these amounts; ingestion resulted in severe internal chemical burns.

== Gulf War ==
On 13 February 1991, a pair of F-117 Nighthawks Operated by the United States Air Force dropped two GBU-27 bunker busting laser-guided bombs on the Amiriyah shelter, killing at least 408 civilians. The U.S. military later stated that they didn't know it was a civilian shelter, instead believing it to be a military bunker operated by the Iraqi Intelligence Service.

== War on terror ==
In the aftermath of the September 11 attacks in 2001, the U.S. Government adopted several new measures in the classification and treatment of prisoners captured in the war on terror, including applying the status of unlawful combatant to some prisoners, conducting extraordinary renditions and using torture ("enhanced interrogation techniques"). Human Rights Watch and others described the measures as being illegal under the Geneva Conventions. (Note: Prisoner abuse) The torture of detainees was extensively detailed in the Senate Intelligence Committee report on CIA torture.

=== Command responsibility ===
A presidential memorandum of 7 February 2002, authorized U.S. interrogators of prisoners captured during the War in Afghanistan to deny the prisoners basic protections required by the Geneva Conventions, and thus according to Jordan J. Paust, professor of law and formerly a member of the faculty of the Judge Advocate General's School, "necessarily authorized and ordered violations of the Geneva Conventions, which are war crimes." Based on the president's memorandum, U.S. personnel carried out cruel and inhumane treatment on captured enemy fighters, which necessarily means that the president's memorandum was a plan to violate the Geneva Convention, and such a plan constitutes a war crime under the Geneva Conventions, according to Professor Paust.

U.S. Attorney General Alberto Gonzales and others have argued that detainees should be considered "unlawful combatants" and as such not be protected by the Geneva Conventions in multiple memoranda regarding these perceived legal gray areas.

Gonzales' statement that denying coverage under the Geneva Conventions "substantially reduces the threat of domestic criminal prosecution under the War Crimes Act" suggests, to some authors, an awareness by those involved in crafting policies in this area that U.S. officials are involved in acts that could be seen to be war crimes. (Note: War Crimes warnings The U.S. Supreme Court challenged the premise on which this argument is based in Hamdan v. Rumsfeld, in which it ruled that Common Article Three of the Geneva Conventions applies to detainees in Guantanamo Bay and that the military tribunals used to try these suspects were in violation of U.S. and international law.)

Human Rights Watch claimed in 2005 that the principle of "command responsibility" could make high-ranking officials within the Bush administration guilty of the numerous war crimes committed during the war on terror, either with their knowledge or by persons under their control. On 14 April 2006, Human Rights Watch said that Secretary Donald Rumsfeld could be criminally liable for his alleged involvement in the abuse of Mohammed al-Qahtani. On 14 November 2006, invoking universal jurisdiction, legal proceedings were started in Germany—for their alleged involvement of prisoner abuse—against Donald Rumsfeld, Alberto Gonzales, John Yoo, George Tenet and others.

The Military Commissions Act of 2006 is seen by some as an amnesty law for crimes committed in the war on terror by retroactively rewriting the War Crimes Act and by abolishing habeas corpus, effectively making it impossible for detainees to challenge crimes committed against them. (Note: Military Commissions Act of 2006)

Luis Moreno-Ocampo told The Sunday Telegraph in 2007 that he was willing to start an inquiry by the International Criminal Court (ICC), and possibly a trial, for war crimes committed in Iraq involving British Prime Minister Tony Blair and American President George W. Bush. Though under the Rome Statute, the ICC has no jurisdiction over Bush, since the U.S. is not a State Party to the relevant treaty—unless Bush were accused of crimes inside a State Party, or the UN Security Council (where the U.S. has a veto) requested an investigation. However, Blair does fall under ICC jurisdiction as Britain is a State Party.

Shortly before the end of President Bush's second term in 2009, news media in countries other than the U.S. began publishing the views of those who believe that under the United Nations Convention Against Torture, the U.S. is obligated to hold those responsible for prisoner abuse to account under criminal law. One proponent of this view was the United Nations Special Rapporteur on torture and other cruel, inhuman or degrading treatment or punishment (Professor Manfred Nowak) who, on 20 January 2009, remarked on German television that former president George W. Bush had lost his head of state immunity and under international law the U.S. would now be mandated to start criminal proceedings against all those involved in these violations of the UN Convention Against Torture. (Note: Special Rapporteur on torture and other cruel, inhuman or degrading treatment or punishment calls for prosecution) Law professor Dietmar Herz explained Nowak's comments by opining that under U.S. and international law former President Bush is criminally responsible for adopting torture as an interrogation tool.

=== War in Afghanistan (2001–2021) ===
In 2005, The New York Times obtained a 2,000-page United States Army investigatory report concerning the homicides of two unarmed civilian Afghan prisoners by U.S. military personnel in December 2002 at the Bagram Theater Internment Facility (also Bagram Collection Point or B.C.P.) in Bagram, Afghanistan, and general treatment of prisoners. The two prisoners, Habibullah and Dilawar, were repeatedly chained to the ceiling and beaten, resulting in their deaths. Military coroners ruled that both the prisoners' deaths were homicides. Autopsies revealed severe trauma to both prisoners' legs, describing the trauma as comparable to being run over by a bus. Seven soldiers were charged in 2005. In January 2006, two soldiers were found guilty of beating captives held in Forward Operating Base Ripley in a separate incident.

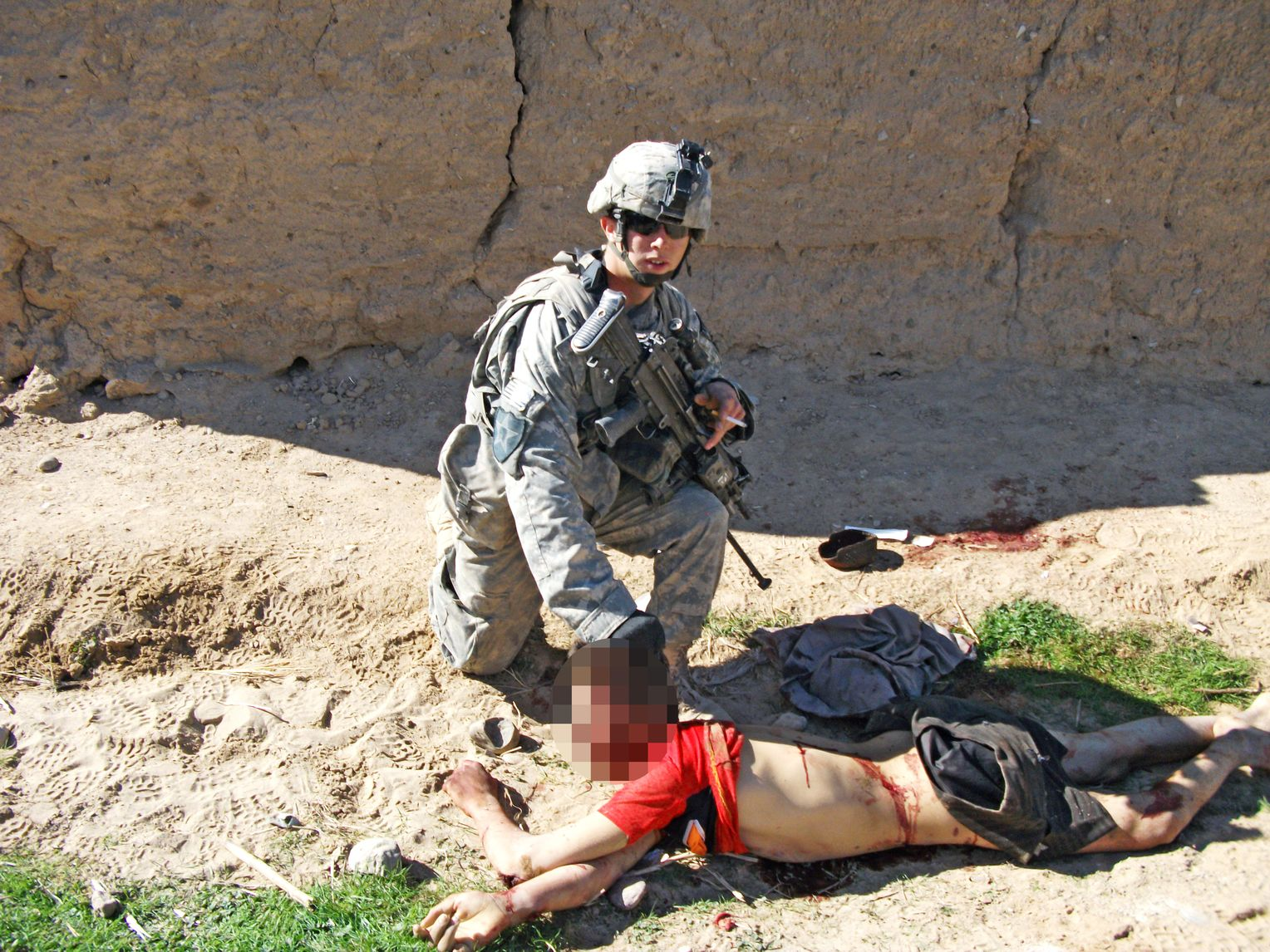
Afghan boy killed on 15 January 2010 by US Army soldiers during the Maywand District murders

The Maywand District murders involved the killing of three Afghan civilians by a group of soldiers during the period June 2009 to June 2010. The soldiers referred to their group as "Kill Team" and were members of the 2nd Battalion, 1st Infantry Regiment, of the 5th Brigade, 2nd Infantry Division. They were based at FOB Ramrod in Maiwand, from Kandahar Province of Afghanistan. During the summer of 2010, the military charged five members of the platoon with the murders of three Afghan civilians in Kandahar Province and collecting their body parts as trophies.

The Kandahar massacre was a mass murder that occurred in the early hours of 11 March 2012, when Staff Sergeant Robert Bales killed 16 Afghan civilians and wounded six others in the Panjwayi District of Kandahar Province, Afghanistan. Nine of the victims were children, and 11 of the dead were from the same family. Bales was taken into custody later that morning when he confessed to authorities that he had committed the murders.

First Lieutenant Clint Lorance was an infantry platoon leader in the 4th Brigade Combat Team of the 82nd Airborne Division. In 2012, Lorance was charged with two counts of unpremeditated murder after he ordered his soldiers to open fire on three Afghan men who were on a motorcycle. He was found guilty by a court-martial in 2013 and sentenced to 20 years in prison (later reduced to 19 years by the reviewing commanding general). He was confined in the United States Disciplinary Barracks at Fort Leavenworth, Kansas, for six years. Lorance was eventually pardoned by President Donald Trump on 15 November 2019.

=== Iraq War ===
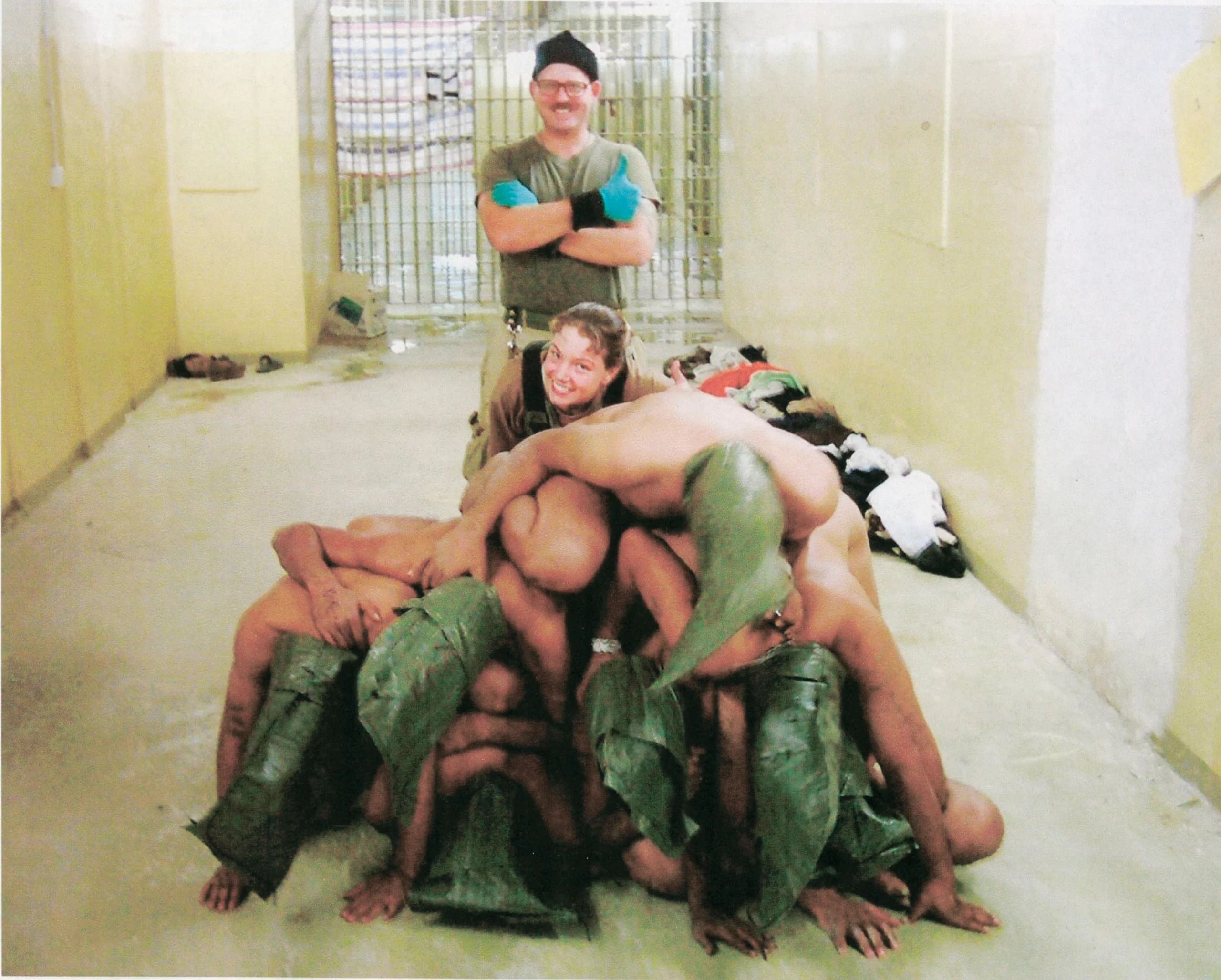
Sabrina Harman and Charles Graner with naked and hooded prisoners forced to form a human pyramid, during the Abu Ghraib torture and prisoner abuse

During the early stages of the Iraq War, a group of soldiers committed a series of human rights violations including physical and sexual abuse against detainees in the Abu Ghraib prison in Iraq. The abuses came to public attention with the publication of photographs of the abuse by CBS News in April 2004. The incidents caused shock and outrage, receiving widespread condemnation within the United States and internationally. The Department of Defense charged eleven soldiers with dereliction of duty, maltreatment, aggravated assault and battery. Between May 2004 and April 2006, these soldiers were court-martialed, convicted, sentenced to military prison, and dishonorably discharged from service. Two soldiers, found to have perpetrated many of the worst offenses at the prison, Charles Graner and Lynndie England, were subject to more severe charges and received harsher sentences. Graner was convicted of assault, battery, conspiracy, maltreatment of detainees, committing indecent acts and dereliction of duty; he was sentenced to 10 years imprisonment and loss of rank, pay and benefits. England was convicted of conspiracy, maltreating detainees and committing an indecent act and sentenced to three years in prison. Brigadier General Janis Karpinski, the commanding officer of all detention facilities in Iraq, was reprimanded and demoted to the rank of colonel. Several more military personnel who were accused of perpetrating or authorizing the measures, including many of higher rank, were not prosecuted. In 2004, President George W. Bush and Defense Secretary Donald Rumsfeld apologized for the Abu Ghraib abuses.

On 12 March 2006, a 14-year-old Iraqi girl named Abeer Qassim Hamza al-Janabi was raped and subsequently murdered along with her 34-year-old mother Fakhriyah Taha Muhasen, 45-year-old father Qassim Hamza Raheem, and 6-year-old sister Hadeel Qassim Hamza al-Janabi. The killings took place in the family home in Yusufiyah, a village to the west of the town of Al-Mahmudiyah, Iraq. Five soldiers from the 502nd Infantry Regiment were charged with rape and murder: Paul E. Cortez, James P. Barker, Jesse V. Spielman, Bryan L. Howard, and Steven Dale Green. Green was discharged from the U.S. Army for mental instability before the crimes were known by his command, whereas Cortez, Barker, Spielman and Howard were tried by a military court martial, convicted, and sentenced to decades in prison. Green was tried and convicted in a United States civilian court and was sentenced to life in prison, but committed suicide in prison in 2014.

John E. Hatley was a first sergeant who was prosecuted by the Army in 2008 for murdering four Iraqi detainees near Baghdad, Iraq in 2006. He was convicted in 2009 and sentenced to life in prison at the Fort Leavenworth Disciplinary Barracks. He was released on parole in October 2020.

The Hamdania incident involved the kidnapping and subsequent murder of an Iraqi man by United States Marines on 26 April 2006, in Al Hamdania, a small village west of Baghdad near Abu Ghraib. An investigation by the Naval Criminal Investigative Service resulted in charges of murder, kidnapping, housebreaking, larceny, obstruction of justice and conspiracy associated with the alleged coverup of the incident.

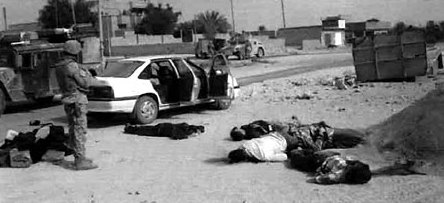
The Haditha massacre

The Haditha massacre occurred on 19 November 2005, in Haditha, Iraq. After Lance Cpl. Miguel Terrazas (20 years old) was killed by a roadside improvised explosive device, Staff Sergeant Frank Wuterich led Marines from the 3rd battalion into Haditha. Twenty-four Iraqi women and children were fatally shot. Wuterich acknowledged in military court that he gave his men the order to "shoot first, ask questions later" after the roadside bomb explosion. Wuterich told military judge Lt. Col. David Jones "I never fired my weapon at any women or children that day." On 24 January 2012, Frank Wuterich was given a sentence of 90 days in prison along with a reduction in rank and pay. The day prior, Wuterich pled guilty to one count of negligent dereliction of duty. No other marine that was involved that day was sentenced to any jail time. For the massacre, the Marine Corps paid $38,000 total to the families of 15 of the dead civilians.

The Nisour Square massacre occurred on 16 September 2007, when employees of Blackwater Security Consulting (now Constellis), a private military company contracted by the US government to provide security services in Iraq, shot at Iraqi civilians, killing 17 and injuring 20 in Nisour Square, Baghdad, while escorting a U.S. embassy convoy. The killings outraged Iraqis and strained relations between Iraq and the United States. In 2014, four Blackwater employees were tried and convicted in U.S. federal court; one of murder, and the other three of manslaughter and firearms charges; all four convicted were controversially pardoned by President Donald Trump in December 2020, in violation of international law.

== 2026 Iran war ==
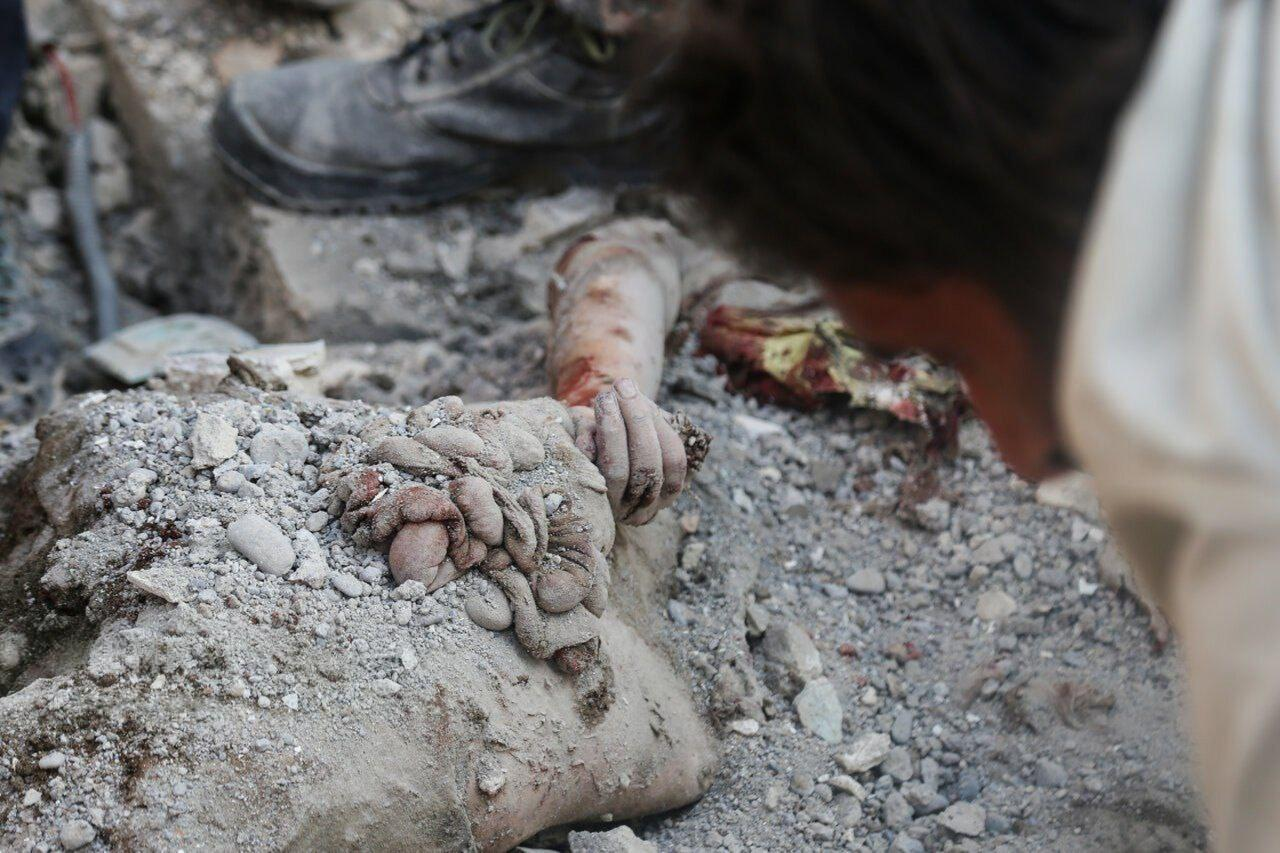
The body of a girl trapped under the rubble after a U.S. airstrike on an elementary school in Minab, Iran

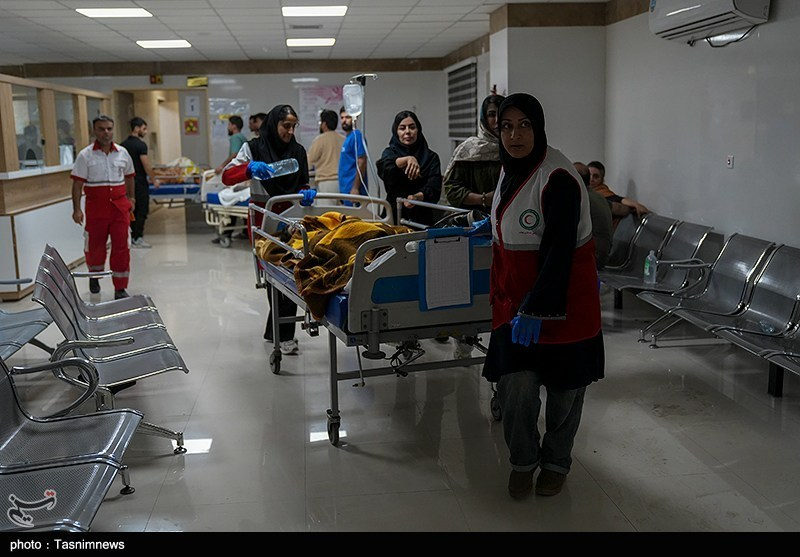
Casualties transported following a U.S. airstrike on civilian sites in Lamerd, Iran, on 28 February 2026

On 28 February 2026, an American airstrike hit a girls' elementary school in Minab, Iran. According to Iranian state media, the attack resulted in 180 fatalities—primarily school children—and 95 injuries. An investigation by The New York Times corroborated that the strike was conducted by United States forces.

On the same day, a missile strike hit a sports hall and an adjacent elementary school in Lamerd, Iran. According to Iranian state media and local officials, the strike killed at least 21 people, including several teenage girls and children who were participating in a volleyball practice. While U.S. Central Command (CENTCOM) denied responsibility for the incident, an investigation by The New York Times and weapons experts, such as Jeffrey Lewis, identified the munition as a U.S.-made, untested Precision Strike Missile (PrSM), citing airburst detonation characteristics and fragmentation patterns found at the scene.

On September 17, 2026, the UN fact-finding mission announced that the United States had committed war crimes in these attacks. The mission said that there were reasonable grounds to believe U.S. forces were responsible for these attacks.

The March sinking of the Iranian frigate IRIS Dena by a U.S. submarine in the Indian Ocean has generated debate regarding potential violations of international law, specifically the Second Geneva Convention, due to allegations that U.S. forces departed the scene without attempting to rescue survivors. The Dena destroyer was attacked in international waters by the US Navy while returning home after participating in the International Fleet Review 2026 and the multinational naval exercise Milan within the framework of international protocols.

An airstrike in the midnight of 15 July 2026, struck an area near Baqaei Children's Cancer Hospital in Ahvaz, Iran, where pediatric cancer patients receive chemotherapy. Under international humanitarian law, the deliberate targeting of a hospital is a war crime as defined by the Fourth Geneva Convention and the Rome Statute of the International Criminal Court.

During a resumption of hostilities in early September, the governor of Hormozgan Province in Iran reported 5 dead and more than 60 wounded after a wedding was hit by an airstrike in Kuhestak. Iran called the attack a war crime and retaliated with strikes against US assets in Bahrain, Jordan, Kuwait and Iraq.

=== Destruction of civilian infrastructure ===
On 18 July, Iranian media reported that U.S. strikes hit power facilities and desalination pumps at the Bonji desalination plant in Jask, Hormozgan Province. Reuters reported that several missiles struck the facilities, citing a local official, and said the attack disrupted water supplies to 20 villages, affecting around 10,000 people. On 23 July, Deutsche Welle reported strikes on Iranian bridges, killing at least 8 people.

== See also ==
- Anti-Americanism
- British war crimes
- Criticism of United States foreign policy
- German war crimes
- Israeli war crimes
- Italian war crimes
- Japanese war crimes
- List of assassinations by the United States
- Russian war crimes
- Turkish war crimes
- United Arab Emirates war crimes
- United States and state-sponsored terrorism
- United States and the International Criminal Court
- United States atrocity crimes
