= Project CHATTER =

1947–1953 US Navy truth serum project

Project Chatter was a United States Navy program beginning in the fall of 1947 focusing on the identification and testing of drugs in interrogations and the recruitment of agents. Their search included laboratory experiments on both animal and human subjects. The program operated under the direction of Charles Savage of the Naval Medical Research Institute, Bethesda, Maryland, from 1947 to 1953. The project was geared toward identifying agents both synthetic and natural that were effective during interrogation, as well as testing possible treatments for depression. The project was centered on, but not restricted to, the use of anabasine (an alkaloid), scopolamine and mescaline. It was the first U.S. government project in which lysergic acid diethylamide (LSD-25) was used on human subjects. The Navy ended the project in 1953 when its experiments were merged into Project MKULTRA.

== See also ==
- MKUltra
- Project Artichoke
- Unethical human experimentation in the United States
