= Battery Howe-Wagner =

Coordinates: 37.8025°N 122.4720°W

Battery Howe-Wagner (1895–1920) was one of seventeen gun batteries developed in the Endicott Board period which formed the Coastal Artillery defenses at Fort Winfield Scott in the Presidio of San Francisco. It was charged with the coastal and harbor defenses of the City of San Francisco and the San Francisco Bay.

== History ==
Originally named Battery Howe, the battery was built to provide both seaward and harbor defenses against enemy warships. Completed in 1895, the battery consisted of four pits, each armed with four 12-inch mortars. The guns had a range of approximately 8 miles.

In 1902 the battery was divided—the two eastern pits retained the name Battery Howe and the two western pits were renamed Battery Arthur Wagner. Designed in the shaped of a cross, this type of battery is called an "Abbott Cross" after General Henry Larcom Abbot, Corps of Engineers, who advocated the use of mortars for seacoast defense. By contrast, the four other mortar batteries in the Harbor Defenses of San Francisco are linear in design. This battery had a 360-degree field of fire and could target the beaches in its range in addition to water. The mortars were dismounted in 1920.

== Naming ==
Battery Howe was named in honor of Colonel Albion P. Howe, Fourth Artillery, a veteran of the Mexican–American War and the American Civil War who also served in San Francisco.

Battery Wagner was named in honor of Colonel Arthur L. Wagner, military secretary who served in the Spanish–American War.
