= MKOFTEN =

US Department of Defense program

Project MKOFTEN was a covert U.S. Department of Defense program developed in conjunction with the Central Intelligence Agency (CIA) sometime in the late 1960s. A partner or descendant program of MKULTRA, the goal of MKOFTEN was to "test the behavioral and toxicological effects of certain drugs on animals and humans". Testing of these drugs was done on animals, prisoners at Holmesburg Prison in Philadelphia, and military personnel at Edgewood Arsenal.

== See also ==
- Stargate Project
- Project ARTICHOKE
- Project MKULTRA
