= Albion P. Howe =

American general

Albion Parris Howe
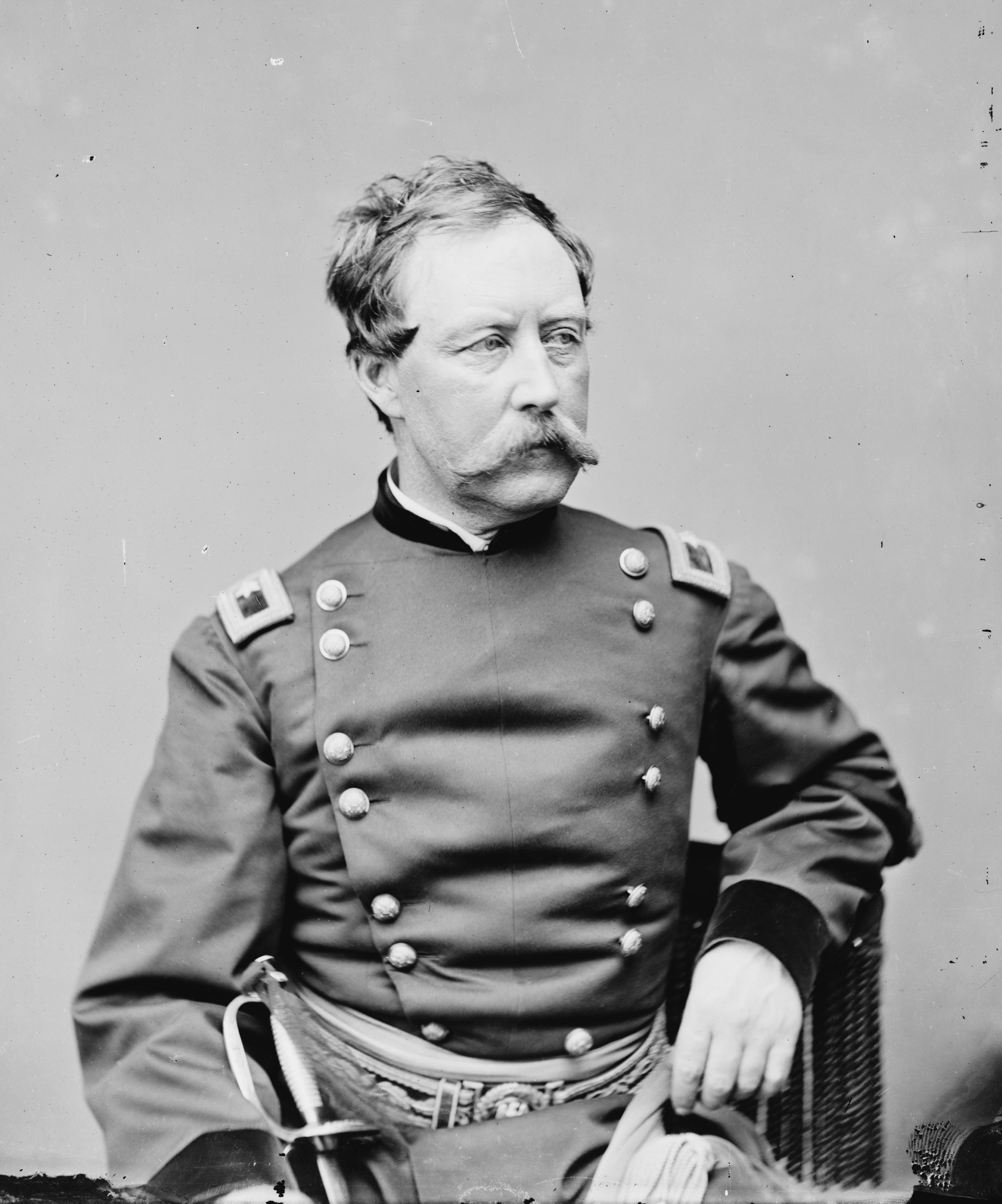
- Born: March 13, 1818; Standish, Maine
- Died: January 25, 1897 (aged 78); Cambridge, Massachusetts
- Burial place: Mount Auburn Cemetery, Cambridge, Massachusetts
- Military career
- Allegiance: United States of America; Union
- Branch: United States Army; Union Army
- Service years: 1841–1882
- Rank: Brigadier General; Brevet Major General
- Commands: 2nd Division, VI Corps; Artillery Depot, Washington, D.C. 4th U.S. Artillery
- Conflicts: Mexican–American War; American Civil War; Second Battle of Bull Run; Battle of South Mountain; Battle of Antietam; Battle of Fredericksburg; Battle of Gettysburg

Albion Parris Howe (March 13, 1818 – January 25, 1897) was an American officer who served as a Union general in the American Civil War. Howe's contentious relationships with superior officers in the Army of the Potomac eventually led to his being deprived of division command.

== Early life and career ==
Howe was born in Standish, Maine. He graduated from the United States Military Academy in 1841. After serving in the 4th U.S. Artillery for two years, he taught mathematics at the U.S. Military Academy for three years.

Howe served in the Mexican War and was awarded a brevet promotion in 1847 to the rank of captain for gallantry during Winfield Scott's advance upon Mexico City, especially for his actions at the Battle of Contreras and the Battle of Churubusco. He was promoted to the rank of captain on March 2, 1855. Howe served under Robert E. Lee during the suppression of John Brown at Harpers Ferry.

== Civil War ==
At the beginning of the Civil War, Howe served under Maj. Gen. George B. McClellan in western Virginia. He took command of John J. Peck's 3rd Brigade, (55th New York, 62nd New York, and the 93rd, 98th, and 102nd Pennsylvania regiments) Couch's 1st Division, Keyes's IV Corps during the Seven Days Battles, after Peck was promoted to command of Silas Casey's Division of the same corps. Howe received the brevet rank of major in the regular army for his role at the Battle of Malvern Hill. He was promoted to the rank of brigadier general in the volunteer service on June 11, 1862.

In the subsequent campaigns of the Army of the Potomac, Howe fought in the Battle of South Mountain and was present at the Battle of Antietam. He was promoted to command 2nd Division, VI Corps, leading it at the Battle of Fredericksburg. His division was heavily engaged at Fredericksburg and Salem Church during the Chancellorsville Campaign. Howe's division led a reconnaissance in the vicinity of Fredericksburg on June 3, 1863, as the Union high command tried to determine whether the Army of Northern Virginia was moving out of its positions to undertake an offensive. It was only minimally engaged in the campaign culminating in the Battle of Gettysburg. His division was the last to reach the battlefield and his two brigades were assigned to opposite ends of the Union line, leaving him effectively without a command. During the pursuit of Lee's retreating army, the 1st Vermont Brigade of Howe's division fought the Confederate rear guard near Funkstown, Maryland, on July 10, 1863. Howe continued in division command during the Bristoe Campaign and the Mine Run Campaign.

Howe was removed from command by Maj. Gen. George G. Meade shortly thereafter. Howe's bad relationship with his corps commander, Maj. Gen. John Sedgwick, including support of Maj. Gen. Joseph Hooker in the controversies that were spawned by the Union defeat at Chancellorsville, probably contributed to this removal. Meade, if he did not initiate Howe's removal, at least did not oppose it. Howe testified against Meade and Sedgwick before the Joint Committee on the Conduct of the War, claiming Sedgwick spoke to him about retreating to Westminster, Maryland. Sedgwick's testimony before the committee contradicted Howe's without naming him. The committee did not pursue this contradiction. What is clear is that Sedgwick sought the services of Brig. Gen. George W. Getty to replace Howe in command of the 2nd Division.

After leaving the Army of the Potomac, Howe commanded the artillery depot in Washington, D.C. He was in the field briefly at Harpers Ferry, opposing the raid on Washington by Confederate Lieutenant General Jubal Early.

== Postbellum service ==
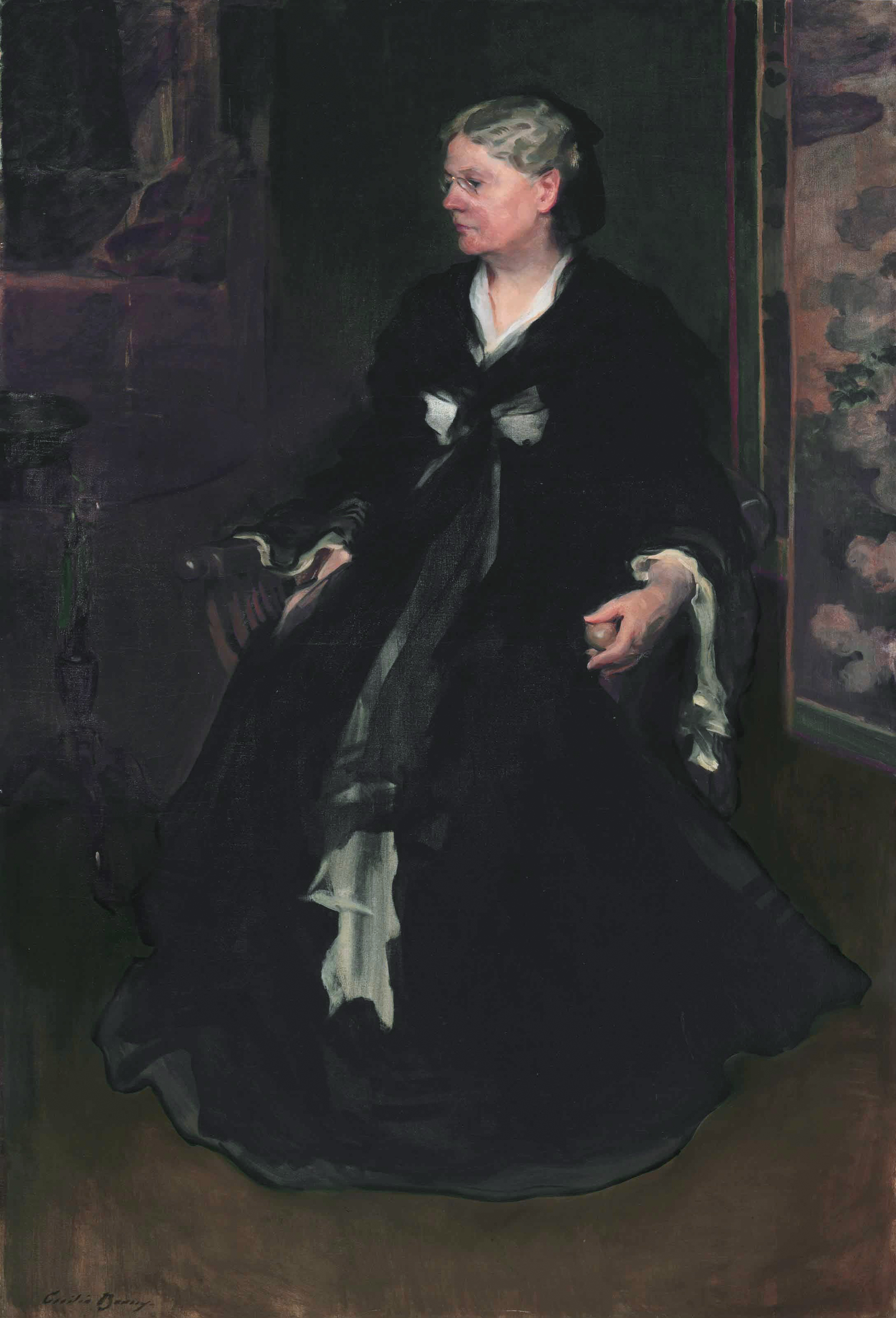
Mrs. Elizabeth M. Howe (Cecilia Beaux, 1903)

At the close of the war, Howe served in the honor guard that stood watch over the corpse of Abraham Lincoln, and soon afterward was appointed as a member of the military commission that tried the Lincoln conspirators. Howe did not make any public comments on the conviction or hanging of Mary E. Surratt, but was not among the five officers who petitioned President Andrew Johnson to commute her sentence to life in prison. Both assignments may indicate that the Radical Republican faction in the Congress found him useful and sympathetic. He also served in the Freedmen's Bureau in 1865. Howe was mustered out of the volunteer service on July 15, 1866.

Howe retired from the Army on June 30, 1882, at the rank of colonel. He was a veteran companion of the Massachusetts Commandery of the Military Order of the Loyal Legion of the United States. He died in Cambridge, Massachusetts, and is buried there in Mount Auburn Cemetery.

Howe was married to Elizabeth, daughter of Andrew Mahaffey, a superintendent of the Pennsylvania Railroad, and Elizabeth McPherson. They had six children.

== See also ==
- List of American Civil War generals (Union)
- Battery Howe-Wagner, named for Howe
