= Arthur L. Wagner =

United States Army general

Arthur Lockwood Wagner
- Born: March 16, 1853; Ottawa, Illinois, U.S.
- Died: June 17, 1905 (aged 52); Asheville, North Carolina, U.S.
- Spouse: Annie B. Howard (m. 1883)
- Military career
- Allegiance: United States of America
- Branch: United States Army
- Service years: 1875–1905
- Rank: Brigadier General
- Conflicts: Indian Wars; Spanish–American War; Philippine–American War

Signature
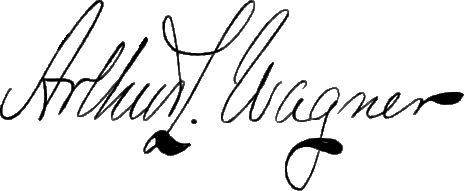

Arthur Lockwood Wagner (March 16, 1853 – June 17, 1905) was a United States brigadier general and military instructor.

== Biography ==
Born in Ottawa, Illinois, Wagner graduated from West Point in 1875 near the bottom of his class with a commission in the infantry. While serving on the frontier, Wagner saw action during campaigns against the Sioux and Nez Perce from 1876 until 1877, and the Utes in 1881. Entering military education while assigned as a professor of military science and tactics at the Louisiana State University and East Florida Seminary, Wagner would win high praise from the Military Service Institution of the United States, and greatly increased his prominence as one of the leading military scholars, for his monograph The Military Necessities of the United States, and the Best Method of Meeting Them in 1884.

Following his transfer to Fort Leavenworth, Kansas the next year, Wagner accepted a personal request by the commandant of the United States Infantry and Cavalry School to be an assistant instructor of tactics and the military arts. During this time, as the Infantry and Cavalry School became an official military training school with the establishment of regulations and training programs in 1888, Wagner would author several important military textbooks including The Campaign of Koniggratz (1889) and Organization and Tactics (1895).

Promoted to captain in 1892, Wagner was named head of the Military Arts Department two years later. Promoted to major in 1896, Wagner was transferred to the adjutant general's office of the War Department as Chief of the Military Information Division.

During the Spanish–American War, Wagner served as a staff officer to Gen. Henry Lawton from June to July 1898 and Gen. Nelson A. Miles until August, serving briefly as adjutant general of the Department of Dakota, before his transfer to the Philippines in December 1899. During the Philippine–American War, Wagner served in various staff positions, reaching the rank of colonel before returning to the United States in 1902 as adjutant general of the Department of the Lakes at Chicago.

Wagner lived in Asheville, North Carolina as a staff officer for the recently established Army War College at the Washington Barracks (Fort Lesley McNair), until his death in Asheville, North Carolina on June 17, 1905, the same day he received a long-sought promotion to brigadier general.

In 1883, Wagner married Annie B. Howard of Pittsburgh. They were the parents of four daughters and a son, including Margaret Howard Wagner, the wife of Brigadier General William K. Naylor.

== Bibliography ==
- The Military Necessities of the United States, and the Best Method of Meeting Them. 1884. (monograph)
- The Campaign of Koniggratz Leavenworth, Kansas, 1889.
- Organization and Tactics. Kansas City, Missouri, 1895.
- The Security of Service and Information. Kansas City, Missouri, 1896.
- The U.S. Army 1776–1899, An Historical Sketch. Akron, Ohio, 1899

== See also ==
- Battery Howe-Wagner, named for Wagner

== Sources ==
- Nenninger, Timothy K. The Leavenworth Schools and the Old Army: Education, Professionalism, and the Officer Corps of the U.S. Army, 1818–1918. Westport, Connecticut, 1978.
- Blythe, Wilson C. Jr. "Arthur L. Wagner, Military Educator and Modernizer". Army History, Winter, 2013

== Biographies ==
- Brereton, T. R. "Educating the U.S. Army: Arthur L. Wagner and Reform, 1875–1905"
- Men of Mark in America
