= Paul F. Gaynor =

American army and intelligence officer (1914–1975)

- Gaynor in 1947.
- Born: Paul Francis Gaynor; June 27, 1914; Scranton, Pennsylvania, US
- Died: May 13, 1975 (aged 60); Arlington, Virginia
- Alma mater: University of Scranton (B.A.); University of Pennsylvania (M.B.A.)
- Military career
- Allegiance: United States
- Branch: United States Army
- Service years: 1941–1973
- Rank: Brigadier general
- Unit: 28th Infantry Division
- Conflicts: World War II: Operation Overlord; Battle of the Bulge; Korean War; Vietnam War
- Awards: Distinguished Service Cross; Intelligence Medal of Merit

Paul Francis Gaynor (June 27, 1914 – May 13, 1975) was an American military officer and Central Intelligence Agency operative. He is best known for his involvement in Project MK Ultra, having overseen and directed its predecessor, Project ARTICHOKE. He is a recipient of the Distinguished Service Cross.

== Early life and education ==
Gaynor was born on June 27, 1914, in Scranton, Pennsylvania. His father, James Gaynor, was the owner of a construction company. Paul was a student at the University of Scranton as well as the University of Pennsylvania, studying business at the latter's Wharton School.

Following his education, Gaynor moved to Dunmore, where he worked for the Pennsylvania Coal Company.

== Army career ==
In 1941, Gaynor enlisted into the 28th Infantry Division of the Pennsylvania National Guard. He began active duty in 1943 when he was shipped off to Europe. He partook in the D-day landings and the Liberation of Paris. In one event during the Battle of the Bulge in December 1944, Gaynor, then a captain, killed eight German soldiers while covering the displacement of his company, before forming a defensive line, causing the Germans to disperse. As a result of his actions, Gaynor was awarded the Distinguished Service Cross.

== Intelligence career ==
Following the establishment of the Central Intelligence Agency in 1947, Gaynor was recruited as a member of the agency's research staff. On February 22, 1951, Gaynor was appointed Chief of Research Staff at the CIA's Office of Security, a position which he initially served until May 1957. During this period, Gaynor and his staff launched a large-scale investigation into homosexual employees in the federal government. Gaynor's "fag file" was eventually uncovered by one State Department employee, John C. Montgomery, who allegedly committed suicide as a result.

Gaynor also became the subject of harsh criticism by CIA Director Allen Dulles, who cautioned Gaynor against his overt support for former Nazi sympathizers in the US government, such as John B. Trevor Jr., as well as congressman Hamilton Fish III.

=== Project ARTICHOKE and MKUltra ===
In 1951, Gaynor was selected by CIA Director Walter Bedell Smith to oversee the agency's new interrogation program, Project ARTICHOKE. The aim of the project was to test drugs on human subjects to determine if these drugs could lead an individual to involuntarily perform an act of attempted assassination. Gaynor was chosen in part due to his experience as an interrogation officer during the war, as well as the CIA's desire to collaborate with the Armed Forces for the project. Gaynor believed human experimentation to be of extreme value and scientific importance, stating that, "It is imperative that [the CIA] move forward more aggressively on identifying and securing a reliable, ready group, or groups, of human research subjects for ongoing Artichoke experimentation."

Project ARTICHOKE was brought under Project MK Ultra following the latter project's launch on April 13, 1953. Whereas previous ARTICHOKE experiments had primarily been conducted abroad, Gaynor initiated a new series of experiments to be tested within the borders of the United States. Gaynor also proposed the establishment of fake left-wing organizations run by the CIA to intercept "undesirable aliens" to be used as subjects for MKUltra, and approved of a plan to recruit over 4,000 military personnel serving court-martial sentences in federal prisons to be experimented on.

=== Later CIA career and death ===
In September 1959, Gaynor was reinstated as the Office of Security's Chief of Research Staff.

Gaynor was among the CIA operatives interviewed during the congressional investigation into the CIA's alleged involvement in the Watergate scandal. During the interview, Gaynor was asked about his relationship with fellow CIA operative and Richard Nixon campaign manager James W. McCord Jr., who had worked in the Office of Security under Gaynor between 1955 and 1962, and had exchanged several letters with Gaynor in the years following. Later, after a report by Gaynor detailing McCord's involvement in the Watergate break-in was uncovered, Gaynor refused to comment on its discovery, claiming that the incident reported had been "blown out of proportion". Gaynor was also mentioned briefly during the Watergate hearings when CIA deputy director Vernon A. Walters referred to a memorandum from Gaynor detailing CIA activities in Mexico.

Gaynor was awarded the Intelligence Medal of Merit upon his retirement from the CIA in 1973. He died suddenly at his home in Arlington County, Virginia on May 13, 1975, aged 60.
