= Sidney Macey (Cyrus Dare) =

Victorian British actor

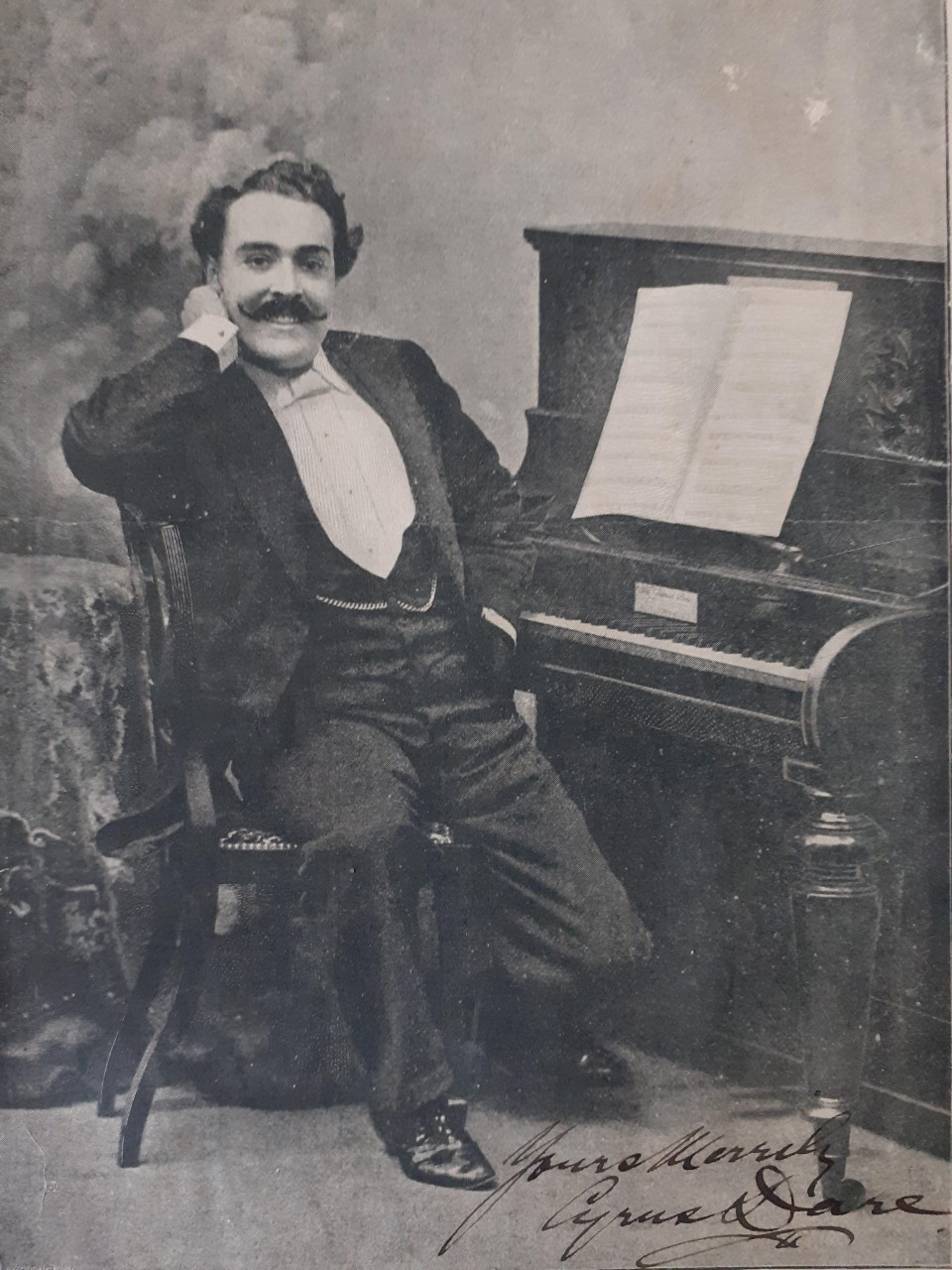
Photograph of Cyrus Dare

Sidney Macey (4 March 1861 – 13 February 1935), better known by his stage name of Cyrus Dare, was an English actor and Society Entertainer in the Victorian and Edwardian eras.

== Early life ==
Sidney Macey was born at number 32 Maiden Lane, Covent Garden, London on 4 March 1861, the eldest son of Sidney Macey (a fishing tackle manufacturer who specialised in the production of artificial flies) and his wife Martha (née Tyler). He was brought up in London and Aylesbury, Buckinghamshire.

== Stage career ==
Macey started acting on the West End stage at the age of ten, appearing in plays such as East Lynne, The Octoroon, The Streets of London and Uncle Tom's Cabin.

As a young man, Macey worked as a Theatrical Performer, before becoming a Society Entertainer (initially performing under the stage name Professor Macey) providing Drawing Room entertainment at the piano at Society House parties, most notably those hosted by Alfred de Rothschild of Halton House. He also played on numerous occasions before Queen Victoria and, later, Edward VII.

In 1895, Macey entered Vaudeville, taking the stage name Cyrus Dare and frequently appeared on the same play bills as such luminaries as Dan Leno and Marie Lloyd. He was popular at all the old-time London variety halls, including the South London Palace of the Varieties, the Tottenham Palace Theatre of Varieties, the Tivoli Theatre of Varieties, the London Pavilion, the Oxford Music Hall, the Alhambra Theatre and the Empire Leicester Square.

In 1896-1897, Macey toured America with Albert Chevalier and, on 11 January 1897, performed before President Grover Cleveland at the Columbia Theatre (Washington, D.C.), as recorded in The Washington DC Evening Times the following day: "When Cyrus Dare came out...and sang in a baby's voice a baby's song, the Presidential dignity was cast to the wind, and the big man roared. The climax of his enjoyment was reached, however, when the baby's head fell off. Then he grew red in the face and threw himself back in his chair so hard that Secretary Olney had to save him from falling. To thousands in the audience the President's pleasure in the baby prattle - though done by a man - suggested that office-seekers had best at once cultivate infantile voices and manners. Mrs. Cleveland seemed to share the President's pleasure, doubtless with thoughts of little ones at home."

Macey toured America again in 1899-1900, this time performing before President William McKinley. It was reported that the President paid little attention to the performance until Cyrus Dare appeared; then, leaning forward, the President became more and more interested in the clever entertainment, until finally he buried his face in his hands and wept with laughter. "You are amused, Mr. President", said someone in the box. "Amused", replied McKinley. "Why, I should think so. If the fellow stays in the country long we shall have to introduce the 'laughing tariff'".

Blessed with fine tenor and falsetto voices, Macey composed over 200 songs, among the most famous being Johnny Jones And Me! (1896), The Unfortunate Child (1901), Forget-Me-Not (1906) and The Burglar and the Child (1912). He also wrote the lyrics for and/or performed numerous compositions published by Charles Sheard & Co.

According to his obituary, Macey was the first evening dress artiste to play a piano - and the first child mimic - on the variety stage. He was also one of the founders of the Variety Artistes' Benevolent Institution (now known as the Royal Variety Charity) which owns and runs Brinsworth House, Twickenham - where he is named on the Founders' Board (as Cyrus Dare) - and did much to raise the standard of the variety stage.

Macey continued to work as a Society Entertainer and in Vaudeville until the outbreak of the First World War, when he retired from the stage after a career spanning more than four decades.

Macey's extensive archive was later donated to the British Music Hall Society.

== Inventor ==
In the early 1890s, Macey briefly returned to the family business of fishing tackle manufacturing, founding Sidney Macey Inimitable Fly Works, of Bates Hill, Redditch, Worcestershire and patenting several fishing tackle inventions.

For a while, Macey also ran a publishing house, Lucas Brothers of 190 Fleet Street, London and patented The Vampola, a mechanical vamp which, when placed on a piano, enabled the performer to play in any key.

== Dare & Dare ==
After WW1, Macey and his son Leonard founded Dare & Dare, a firm of Auctioneers, Surveyors, House Land and Estate Agents, in Barnes and Surbiton. They were both Members of The National Association of Auctioneers, House Agents, Rating Surveyors and Valuers.

== Family ==
Macey's father, Sidney Macey (senior), was born in Chilmark, Wiltshire - a village famous for the Chilmark Quarries - where the Macey family (also spelt Macy/Macie/Macye) had resided since before the Reformation. John Macye alias Banston, a yeoman farmer, was granted a copyhold tenancy of land in Chilmark by Cecily Bodenham, the last Abbess of Wilton Abbey, dated 20 January 1539; and his (putative) forebear, William Banston, a stone mason from Normandy in France, was recorded as being a householder in Chilmark in the first ever alien subsidy (a tax levied upon first-generation immigrants) dated 10 July 1440.

Macey was thus distantly related to the progenitor of the American Macy family, Thomas Macy (1608 – 1682) and his descendants (including the founder of Macy's department store, Rowland Hussey Macy (30 August 1822 – 29 March 1877), the industrialist Valentine Everit Macy (23 March 1871 – 21 March 1930), the philanthropist Josiah Macy Jr. (c.1837 - 5 October 1876) and the actor William H Macy (born 13 March 1950)). Another descendant, Silvanus J. Macy, compiled The Genealogy of the Macy family from 1635-1868.

Macey married Alice Lloyd Watson, daughter of Thomas Watson, Gentleman on 30 August 1890, and had 3 children: Madeline Alice Macey (1891-1983), Leonard Sidney Macey (1894-1976), and Doris Lenore Macey (1895-1980) (all of whom were usually known by the surname Dare).

Macey died in London on 13 February 1935 and was cremated at Golders Green.

== Change of surname to Macey-Dare ==
By Deed Poll dated 7 May 1924 and enrolled in the Supreme Court of Judicature on 13 May 1924, Macey's son, Leonard, legally changed the family surname to Macey-Dare.

== Arms of Macey-Dare ==
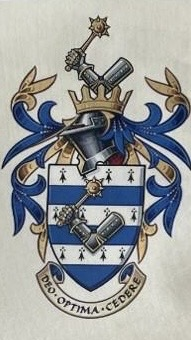
Macey-Dare arms

By Letters Patent dated 30 June 1992, Macey's eldest grandson Dr. Barry Leonard Cyrus Macey-Dare LDS RCS (Eng) MSc (Lond) LLM (Bris) (1926 - 2021) - the first person to be born with the double-barrelled, hyphenated surname of Macey-Dare (and who married Dr. Nuala Mary Brigid Mitzi Coyle LDS BDS (RCS England) BSc LLB MBA (OU), DDPH (KCL), Diploma in Forensic Odontology, daughter of Dr. Cecil Dermot Coyle and granddaughter of James Vincent Coyle C.B.E., armiger) - was granted arms by Sir Colin Cole (officer of arms), Garter King of Arms.

Escutcheon

Barry of six Ermine and Azure an Arm in Armour embowed fessewise and gauntleted proper garnished Or holding a Spiked Mace Gold

Crest

Within a Crown Vallary Or an Arm in Armour as in the Arms holding a Spiked Mace Gold

Motto

Deo Optima Cedere (To give the best things up to God)
