= Lawrence K. Frank =

American social scientist

Lawrence Kelso Frank
- Born: December 6, 1890; Cincinnati, Ohio
- Died: September 23, 1968 (aged 77); Boston, Massachusetts
- Occupations: Social scientist, gerontologist, administrator
- Awards: Lasker Award

Academic background
- Education: BA, LL.D.
- Alma mater: Columbia University

Academic work
- Era: 1923-1968
- Discipline: Sociology; Gerontology
- Sub-discipline: Social gerontology; Parent education; Child development

Lawrence Kelso Frank (December 6, 1890 – September 23, 1968) was an American social scientist, administrator, and parent educator, particularly known as vice-president of the Josiah Macy Jr. Foundation and together with Frank Fremont-Smith initiator of the Macy conferences.

== Biography ==
Born and raised in Cincinnati, Ohio Frank received his Bachelor of Arts degree in economics from Columbia University in 1912. In 1959 he also received an honorary degree of LL.D. degree at Wayne State University. At Columbia Frank met the economist Wesley C. Mitchell, who guided the National Bureau of Economic Research, and his wife Lucy Sprague Mitchell, who founded Bank Street College of Education as the Bureau of Educational Experiments. They became friends and important mentors of Frank.

Frank was director of the Laura Spelman Rockefeller Memorial from 1923 to 1929. He directed the child-development program in the Rockefeller Foundation from 1929 to 1933 and became part of its General Education Board in 1933. From 1936 to 1942 he was vice-president of the Josiah Macy Foundation, Frank was among the attendees of the first Macy meeting in 1942 with other scientists such as the anthropologists Gregory Bateson and Margaret Mead, the neurophysiologist Warren McCulloch, the physician and physiologist Arturo Rosenblueth and the psychoanalyst Lawrence Kubie. From 1945 to 1950 he was director of the Caroline Zachry Institute of Human Development.

Beside his administrative career he was visiting professor and lecturer at several institutions, member of many learned societies and organizations, and wrote a series of books of educational and social matters. He received the Lasker Award in mental health in 1947, the Parents' magazine award for an outstanding book in 1950. In some of these writings, Frank suggested that the American focus on individualism should be re-balanced in favor of more group responsibility.

His papers are held at the National Library of Medicine in Bethesda, Maryland.

== Selected publications ==
Frank authored numerous articles and books.

- 1920. Review of Business Research and Statistics by J. George Frederick. Quarterly Publications of the American Statistical Association, vol. 17, no. 132 (Dec. 1920), pp. 517–19. doi:10.2307/2965256. JSTOR 2965256.
- 1925. "Social Problems." American Journal of Sociology, vol. 30, no. 4 (Jan. 1925).
- 1926. The Problem of Learning
- 1936. Society as the Patient, American Journal of Sociology, vol. 42, no. 3, 1936
- 1942. Conserving Human Resources in the Field of Early Childhood.
- 1946. Gerontology, Journal of Gerontology, Volume 1, Issue 1, Part 1, January 1946 doi:10.1093/geronj/1.1_Part_1.1
- 1948. Personality and Culture, the Psychocultural Approach. Prepared for the Bureau for Intercultural Education and the American Education Fellowship.
- 1948. Projective Methods.
- 1950. How to Help your Child in School, with Mary Frank.
- 1950. Society as the Patient: Essays on Culture and Personality. New Brunswick, NJ: Rutgers University Press.
- 1951. Nature and Human Nature: Man's New Image of Himself, with Ruth Hartley and Robert Goldenson. New Brunswick, NJ: Rutgers University Press. ISBN 978-0837124537.
- 1951. Cultural Determinism and Free Will. Cincinnati: Hebrew Union College-Jewish Institute of Religion.
- 1952. Understanding Children's Play. New York: Columbia University Press.
- 1953. Babies are Puppies, Puppies are Babies
- 1953. Personality Development in Adolescent Girls. New Orleans: Society for Research in Child Development, vol. XVI, no. 53.
- 1954. Feelings and Emotions.
- 1954. How to Be a Modern Leader. New York: Association Press.
- 1954. How to Be a Woman, with Mary Frank. New York: Bobbs-Merrill.
- 1955. Individual Development.
- 1956. Your Adolescent at Home and in School, with Mary Hughes Frank.
- 1961. Conduct of Sex: Biology and Ethics of Sex and Parenthood in Modern Life. New York: Morrow.
- 1966. On the Importance of Infancy. New York: Random House.
