= Frank Fremont-Smith =

Frank Fremont-Smith (3 March 1895 – 27 February 1974) was an American administrator, executive with the Josiah Macy, Jr. Foundation, president of British General Rees's World Federation of Mental Health, known together with Lawrence K. Frank as motivators of the Macy conferences, and as promoter for interdisciplinary conferences as platforms for advancing knowledge.

== Work ==
After receiving his MD from Harvard in 1921, Fremont-Smith started working in the 1920s at the department of neuropathology at the Harvard Medical School in Boston, Massachusetts. By 1936 he was a faculty member at Harvard Medical School and at the Boston City Hospital. In that year he moved to become the medical director and the executive secretary of the Macy Foundation, where he started to evolve a problem-solving, multidisciplinary conference format.

Fremont-Smith was familiar with what would become cybernetics' prehistory, because of his involvement in the 1930s in an informal conversational network around neurophysiology and the work of Walter Cannon on homeostasis.

A second initiative he organized in the 1940s was a meeting about "physiological mechanisms underlying the phenomena of conditioned reflexes and hypnosis as related to the problem of cerebral inhibition." This so-called "Cerebral Inhibition Meeting" was sponsored by the Josiah Macy Foundation attended by scientists like Gregory Bateson, and Margaret Mead, and five others. Together they would initiate the Cybernetics Group. Among its members this group was called the "Man-Machine Project". Other participants were Warren McCulloch, Arturo Rosenblueth, Gregory Bateson, Margaret Mead, and Lawrence K. Frank. According to Steinberg (2000) "Rosenblueth, a protégé of Norbert Wiener, set out the broad parameters of the proposed effort." Fremont-Smith later continued his initiative, funding Macy Conferences between 1946 and 1953 on the subject. The first, "Circular Causal and Feedback Mechanisms in Biological and Social Systems", was one of the first organized studies of interdisciplinarity, spawning breakthroughs in systems theory and leading to the foundation of what later was to be known as cybernetics. In the 1950s he was among the first members of the Society for General Systems Research.

Fremont-Smith continued to direct the Macy Conference Program, covering a range of topics in biomedical and social sciences, until 1960. In 1959 he was the organizer of the first ever held conferences on LSD.

In retirement from the Macy Foundation, Fremont-Smith began the Interdisciplinary Communications Program (1968-1976) at the Smithsonian Institution.

== Family life ==
He was married to Frances Eliot Fremont-Smith, and the youngest of their three sons was Eliot Fremont-Smith (1929-2007) a former critic for The New York Times.

== Publications ==
Articles

- "The Nature of the Reducing Substances in the Blood Serum of Limulus Polyphemus and in the Serum, Cerebrospinal Fluid and Aqueous Humor of Certain Elasmobranchs," with Mary Elizabeth Dailey. Biological Bulletin, vol. 62, no. 1 (February 1932), pp. 37–41.
- "Rights and Responsibilities." N C Med J., vol. 14, no. 9 (September 1953), pp. 405–408.
- "The Mental Health Aspects of the Peaceful Use of Atomic Energy." Am J Orthopsychiatry., vol. 28, no. 3 (July 1958), pp. 456–466.
- "World Mental Health Year." Hosp Prog., vol. 41 (February 1960), pp. 46–48.
- "Communication Across Scientific Disciplines." J Child Asthma Res Inst Hosp Denver, vol. 1 (March 1961), pp. 4–14.
- "The Interdisciplinary Conference." AIBS Bulletin, vol. 11, no. 2 (April 1961), pp. 17–32.
- "The Interdisciplinary Conference." J Asthma Res., vol. 65 (September 1963), pp. 3–10.
- "The Role of Foundation in Medical Research." New England Journal of Medicine, vol. 271 (December 24, 1964), pp. 1348–1351. doi:10.1056/NEJM196412242712606.
- "Small Conferences." Science, vol. 148, no. 3678 (June 25, 1965), pp. 1669–1670.
- "The Neurological Justification for the Use of Interruption in Communication." Trans Am Neurol Assoc., vol. 94 (1969), pp. 160–164.
- "The Neurological Justification for the Use of Interruption in Communication." Perspect Biol Med., vol. 14, no. 2 (1971), pp. 333–338.

Book contributions

- Foreword to The Patient Speaks: Mother Story Verbatim in Psychoanalysis of Allergic Illness, by Dr. Harold A. Abramson. Preface by M. Murray Peshkin. New York: Vantage Press (1956). ISBN 0533043433.
- Introduction to The Use of LSD in Psychotherapy, by Dr. Harold A. Abramson. New York: Josiah Macy, Jr. Foundation (1960), pp. 7–23.
  - Reprinted as "A Symposium." In: The Drug Experience: First-Person Accounts of Addicts, Writers, Scientists, and Others. Edited, with introduction and notes, by David Ebin. New York: Orion Press (1961), pp. 368–385. LCCN 61--9301.
- Preface to The Use of LSD in Psychotherapy and Alcoholism. Edited by Dr. Harold A. Abramson. Indianapolis, Indiana: Bobbs-Merrill (1967), pp. xv-xvi.

"Proceedings of the Second International Conference on the Use of LSD in Psychotherapy and Alcoholism, at the South Oaks Hospital, in Amityville, New York, May 8–10, 1965."

Letters to the editor

- "Pros and Con Regarding LSD" (letter to the editor). New England Journal of Medicine, vol. 274, no. 9 (March 3, 1966), pp. 522–523.

An editorial reply to a previous editorial, "LSD - A Dangerous Drug."
