= Joseph C. Kolars =

American physician

Joseph C. Kolars is an American physician who is the Senior Associate Dean for Education and Global Initiatives, the Josiah Macy Jr. Professor of Health Professions Education, and Professor of Internal Medicine at the University of Michigan Medical School.

== Education ==
Kolars attended the University of Minnesota Medical School and graduated in 1982. He completed his residency in internal medicine and fellowship in Gastroenterology at Michigan.

== Career ==
Remaining at Michigan after his postgraduate training, Kolars began his career in 1989 as an instructor in the Department of Internal Medicine. In 1991, he became an assistant professor. Between 1993 and 1996, he served as the associate chair for graduate medical education and the Department of Internal Medicine residency program director. In 1995, he earned a promotion to associate professor with tenure in 1995.

Between 1996 and 1999, Kolars moved to Shanghai to create China's first western-based health care system.

In 1999, he moved to the Mayo Clinic to serve as the Department of Internal Medicine residency program director and professor of medicine and consultant to the Gastroenterology and Hepatology Division. After 10 years, he was recruited back to Michigan to become the first Senior Associate Dean for Education and Global Initiatives at Michigan in 2009.

Between 2007 and 2012, Kolars divided his time between the Mayo Clinic, Michigan, and the Bill and Melinda Gates Foundation to work as a consultant on education systems to build human resource capacity for health internationally. From 2009, he was Senior Associate Dean for Education and Global Initiatives at the University of Michigan Medical School.

In 2010, he began jointly directing the Joint Institute for Translational and Clinical Research with the Peking University Health Science Center.

== Research ==
Kolars has published more than 100 scientific manuscripts over the course of his career. His research has focused on global health and improving and strengthening education system in low-resource settings. Kolars has also been involved in the National Institutes of Health's Medical Education Partnership Initiative (MEPI).

Kolars serves on the Fogarty International Center Advisory Council at the National Institutes of Health. At Michigan, he is Co-Principal Investigator of a Fogarty-funded Global Health Fellows Program that is part of the Northern Pacific Global Health Research Fellows Training Consortium, which is 1 of 5 such programs.

== Honors and awards ==
In 2016, he was voted on to the Board of the Consortium of Universities for Global Health.

In 2019, Kolars was awarded the Abraham Flexner Award for Distinguished Service to Medical Education from the Association of American Medical Colleges (AAMC).
