= Julian Bigelow =

American computer engineer (1913–2003)

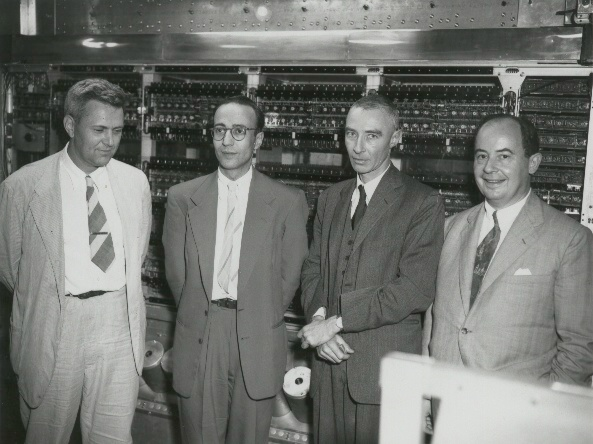
Julian Bigelow at The Princeton Institute for Advanced Study (Left to right: Julian Bigelow, Herman Goldstine, J. Robert Oppenheimer, and John von Neumann)

Julian Himely Bigelow (March 19, 1913 – February 17, 2003) was a pioneering American computer engineer.

== Life ==
Bigelow was born in 1913 in Nutley, New Jersey. He obtained a master's degree at the Massachusetts Institute of Technology, studying electrical engineering and mathematics. During World War II, he assisted Norbert Wiener in his research on automated fire control for anti-aircraft guns, leading to the development of the so-called Wiener filter.

Bigelow coauthored (with Wiener and Arturo Rosenblueth) one of the founding papers on cybernetics and modern teleology, "Behavior, Purpose and Teleology" (1943), which was published in Philosophy of Science. This paper mulled over the way mechanical, biological, and electronic systems could communicate and interact. This paper instigated the formation of the Teleological Society and later the Macy conferences. Bigelow was an active member of both organizations. He was a visiting scholar for many years at the Institute for Advanced Study in Princeton.

When John von Neumann sought to build one of the first digital computers at the Institute for Advanced Study, he hired Bigelow in 1946 as his "engineer," on Wiener's recommendation. The computer Bigelow built following von Neumann's design is called the IAS machine, although it was also called the MANIAC, a name that was later transferred to the successful clone of this machine at Los Alamos. Because von Neumann did not patent the IAS and wrote about it freely, 15 clones of the IAS were soon built. Nearly all general-purpose computers subsequently built are recognizable as influenced by the IAS machine's design.

Bigelow died on February 17, 2003, in Princeton, New Jersey.
