= Howard Liddell =

Howard Liddell may refer to:

- Howard Liddell (psychologist) (1895–1967), American professor of psychology
- Howard Liddell (architect) (1945–2013), British architect
