= Cheryl Woods Giscombe =

American nursing academic

Cheryl Woods Giscombé
- Born: Cheryl L. Woods Giscombé
- Awards: Fellow of the American Academy of Nursing (2017); Member of the National Academy of Medicine (2023)

Academic background
- Education: University of North Carolina at Chapel Hill

Cheryl L. Woods Giscombé is an American psychiatric nurse practitioner, health psychologist, and academic. She is the Melissa and Harry LeVine Family Distinguished Professor at the University of North Carolina at Chapel Hill (UNC) School of Nursing, with a secondary appointment in the UNC School of Medicine.

== Education and early career ==
Woods Giscombé earned undergraduate and graduate degrees in nursing and psychology from the University of North Carolina at Chapel Hill, North Carolina Central University, and Stony Brook University. She holds a Ph.D. in social and health psychology and is nationally board certified as a psychiatric-mental health nurse practitioner. From 2005 to 2007, she completed a postdoctoral fellowship at the UNC School of Nursing, followed by a second fellowship from 2007 to 2009 supported by the Substance Abuse and Mental Health Services Administration. She was a Robert Wood Johnson Foundation Nurse Faculty Scholar from 2012 to 2015.

== Academic career ==
At UNC-Chapel Hill, Giscombé has served in multiple leadership roles, including Associate Dean for the PhD and Postdoctoral Fellowship Programs, Senior Associate Dean for Academic Affairs, and Assistant/Associate Dean for the MSN Program. She currently serves as Senior Associate Dean and Chief Wellness Officer in the School of Nursing. Her work incorporates art museum-based contemplative practices and mindfulness-based education, and she has partnered with the Harvard Macy Institute and Harvard Medical School’s Continuing Medical Education programs on visual thinking strategies in healthcare. She also chaired the NIH study section titled Biobehavioral Mechanisms of Emotion, Stress, and Health (MESH).

== Research ==
Giscombé's research examines the impact of stress and coping strategies on psychological and physical health outcomes, including cardiometabolic conditions such as diabetes and pre-diabetes. She employs a variety of research methods, including community-engaged approaches, biomarker analysis, and both qualitative and quantitative designs. Her research has been funded by the National Institutes of Health (NIH) for over two decades. She has served as Multiple Principal Investigator (MPI) for NIH-funded studies, including the NCCIH T32 Research Training Fellowship in Complementary and Integrative Health (2022–2027) and R01 and R21 grants.

She is also known for developing the Superwoman Schema™ Conceptual Framework and Giscombé Superwoman Schema™ Questionnaire, tools used to examine stress and resilience in Black women. In 2024, she authored The Black Woman’s Guide to Coping with Stress.

== Selected honors ==
- Macy Faculty Scholar by the Josiah Macy Jr. Foundation (2015)
- Fellow of the American Academy of Nursing (2017)
- Jeanette Chamberlain Psychiatric Nursing Leadership Award, International Society of Psychiatric Nurses (2018)
- Faculty Award for Excellence in Doctoral Mentorship, UNC School of Nursing (2016)
- Mind & Life Fellow
- Elected member of the National Academy of Medicine (2023)
