= Ann Fowler Rhoads =

American botanist

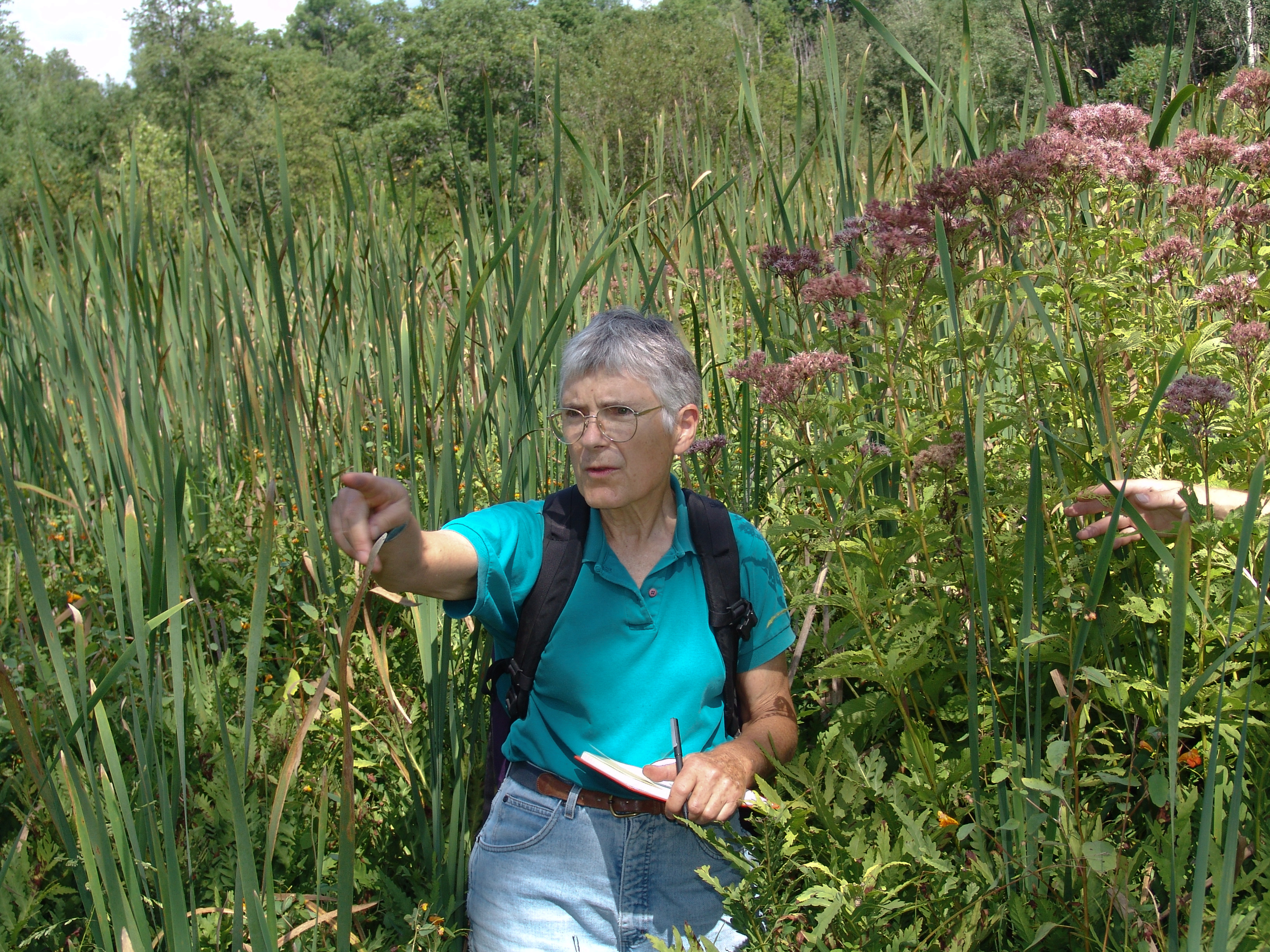
- Born: 1938 (age 87–88); Delaware County, Pennsylvania
- Citizenship: American
- Education: Rutgers University
- Known for: Pennsylvania plant communities
- Awards: Henry Meigs Environmental Leadership Award, Hamilton Award
- Scientific career
- Fields: Botanist
- Workplaces: Morris Arboretum, University of Pennsylvania

Ann Fowler Rhoads (born 1938) is an American botanist who worked as a plant pathologist at Morris Arboretum for 36 years, retiring in 2013. She is the co-founder (with Timothy A. Block) of the Pennsylvania Flora Project of Morris Arboretum. In addition, Rhoads is a former adjunct professor at the University of Pennsylvania and a former Research Associate at the Academy of Natural Sciences.

Rhoads has written and edited 6 books. Her most important work is The Plants of Pennsylvania: An Illustrated Manual, which she coauthored with Timothy Block. It has been called the "Bible of our state's plant life". It is particularly significant “because most states simply don’t have such a comprehensive work on regional flora. Relevant to plant life found in much of the Northeast, the book has also been requested in neighboring states." A second edition was published in 2007.

In 2014, the Chestnut Hill Local said of Ann Rhoads: “Through tireless documentation, a specimen collection of 14,000 plants, and sharing her discoveries and expertise in books and articles, she has significantly advanced our understanding of Pennsylvania plant communities.” Ari Novy, former Executive Director of the U.S. Botanic Garden, called her “a giant in the world of plants who has championed plant education in the Mid-Atlantic." She has also been referred to as a “legend among the region's ecological scientists.”

In 2016, Rhoads became the inaugural recipient of the Hamilton Award from Rutgers Gardens. This award is named for former director Bruce Hamilton, and recognizes “an unsung hero, a quiet leader, or patient mentor in the field of horticulture".

== Early life and education ==
Ann Rhoads was born in Delaware County, PA, the daughter of activist Eleanor Woolley Fowler and granddaughter of psychologist Helen Thompson Woolley; her childhood was spent on her parents' farm in southern New Jersey near the Pine Barrens. She currently resides in Bucks County with her husband.

She was inspired by the book The Vegetation of the New Jersey Pine-Barrens: An Ecologic Investigation by John William Harshberger. She and her father found the book in Leary’s Used Bookstore after they had moved to New Jersey. Fowler says “that book opened horizons for me because I realized at that moment that you could study this stuff".

Rhoads graduated from Rutgers University in 1976, where her graduate work focused on plant pathology. At that time there were not many women earning PhD's in the sciences.

== Career and regional impact ==
Rhoads was hired to be a botanist by the Morris Arboretum in 1976, shortly after she completed her PhD. While working at the Morris Arboretum, Rhoads created a database of Pennsylvania plants and introduced Integrated pest management (IPM) practices. These accomplishments have been used locally in the Delaware Valley and as a model for other states. She retired from the Morris Arboretum in 2013.

In addition, Rhoads contributed botanical images of Ribes rubrum to the SEINet data portal, a website which accesses “distributed data resources of interest to the environmental research community within Arizona and New Mexico….. SEINet is more than just a web site - it is a suite of data access technologies and a distributed network of collections, museums and agencies that provide environmental information.”

Rhoads has said that her “research interests are focused on the floristics of Pennsylvania.” Floristics is the scientific study of the distribution of plants, especially on the regional level. Rhoads wants “to document the natural vegetation of the state and better understand historical and contemporary influences that have shaped the patterns of plant distribution we see today.” Her research has applications to climate change and how it will affect our local flora. Increases in sea level and temperature are likely to stress both plants and animals, as changes occur in the specific areas and conditions to which they have adapted. Biodiversity is predicted to decline, because, as Rhoads notes, "Things just don't evolve and adapt as fast as they would need to.” Understanding existing and historic plant distributions may help researchers to develop measures for mitigation and restoration of threatened areas.

Rhoads was an adjunct professor in the Department of Biology at The University of Pennsylvania where she taught Field Botany. She is also a former Research Associate at the Academy of Natural Sciences, as well as the co-founder (with Timothy Block) of the Pennsylvania Flora Project.

Rhoads is a former board member of the Natural Lands Trust, a non-profit organization focused on connecting people to the outdoors in eastern Pennsylvania and southern New Jersey. During her tenure at the Natural Lands Trust, she created the Green Hill Preserves project, where she can observe botanical changes over time.

== Awards ==
Rhoads was awarded the Henry Meigs Environmental Leadership Award in 2014 by the Schuylkill Center for Environmental Education. She is the ninth person to earn this award.

She is the inaugural recipient of the Hamilton Award a national-level award first presented by Rutgers Gardens in 2016. This award is named for former director Bruce Hamilton, and recognizes “an unsung hero, a quiet leader, or patient mentor in the field of horticulture.”

== Publications ==
- Majumdar, Shyamal K.; Brenner, Fred J.; Rhoads, Ann Fowler, eds. (1986). Endangered and threatened species programs in Pennsylvania and other states : causes, issues, and management. Pennsylvania: Pennsylvania Academy of Science. ISBN 0960667059. OL 2743563M.
- Rhoads, Ann Fowler; Klein, William McKinley (1993). The vascular flora of Pennsylvania : annotated checklist and atlas. Philadelphia, PA: American Philosophical Society. ISBN 0871692074. OL 8349213M.
- Rhoads, Ann Fowler; Block, Timothy A. (2000). The Plants of Pennsylvania: An Illustrated Manual. Illustrations by Anna Anisko (1st ed.). University of Pennsylvania Press. ISBN 0812235355. This book is a field guide to 134 native plants in Pennsylvania and 62 other species that can be found in the state. The second edition was published in 2007 and has been updated to include over 34,000 species.
- Rhoads, Ann Fowler; Block, Timothy A. (2004). Trees of Pennsylvania A Complete Reference Guide. Illustrations by Anna Anisko (1st ed.). University of Pennsylvania Press. ISBN 9780812237856. OL 9791608M.
- Latham, Roger Earl; Beyea, Jan; Benner, Merlin; Dunn, Cindy Adams; Fajvan, Mary Ann; Freed, Ronald R.; Grund, Marrett; Horsley, Stephen B.; Rhoads, Ann Fowler; Shissler, Bryon P. (2005). Managing White-tailed Deer in Forest Habitat From an Ecosystem Perspective: Pennsylvania Case Study. Harrisburg: Audubon Pennsylvania and the Pennsylvania Habitat Alliance.
- Block, Timothy A.; Rhoads, Ann Fowler (2011). Aquatic Plants of Pennsylvania: a Complete Reference Guide. Philadelphia, PA: University of Pennsylvania Press. ISBN 9780812243062. OL 25120133M.
