= Macy conferences =

Interdisciplinary conferences on cybernetics and feedback systems (1941–60)

The Macy conferences were a set of meetings of scholars from various academic disciplines held in New York under the direction of Frank Fremont-Smith at the Josiah Macy Jr. Foundation starting in 1941 and ending in 1960. The conferences aimed to promote communication across scientific disciplines and restore unity to science. There were several series of conferences covering specific topics, a total of 160 conferences over 19 years; the phrase "Macy conferences" is often applied specifically to the series on cybernetics. Disciplinary isolation within medicine was a particular concern of the Macy Foundation, whose mandate was to aid medical research. Other series covered: aging, adrenal cortex, biological antioxidants, blood clotting, blood pressure, connective tissues, infancy and childhood, liver injury, metabolic interrelations, nerve impulse, problems of consciousness, and renal function.

== Overview ==
The Josiah Macy, Jr. Foundation developed two innovations to facilitate interdisciplinary and multidisciplinary exchanges: the Macy conferences and their published transcripts, the widely circulated Macy transactions. The conferences were conversations discussing preliminary research papers still in progress, less formal than the finished papers at typical conferences. Rather than the revised and finished papers in typical conference proceedings, the transactions were far less formal, aiming to invite more scholars into the exchange and allow a wider audience to hear experts exchange ideas, as well as to document the talks. Fremont-Smith said that free discussion should take priority over authoritative statements.

Participants were leading scientists from a wide range of fields. Several participants recall the initial difficulties in communication among specialists in different areas, then the gradual establishment of a common language bridging the various fields of expertise. Participants were chosen for their experience with multidisciplinary engagement, or for expertise in multiple disciplines. Many felt that the interdisciplinary understanding which grew over the course of the conferences fertilized their creativity.

== Conference topics ==
=== Cerebral Inhibition Meeting ===
The Macy Cybernetics Conferences were preceded by the Cerebral Inhibition Meeting, organized by Frank Fremont-Smith and Lawrence K. Frank, and held on 13–15 May 1942. Those invited were Gregory Bateson, Frank Beach, Carl Binger, Felix Deutsch, Flanders Dunbar, Julie Eisenbud, Carlyla Jacobsen, Lawrence Kubie, Jules Masserman, Margaret Mead, Warren McCulloch, Bela Mittelmann, David Rapoport, Arturo Rosenblueth, Donald Sheehan, Georg Soule, Robert White, John Whitehorn, and Harold Wolff. There were two topics:

- Hypnotism introduced by Milton Erickson
- Conditioned reflex introduced by Howard Liddell

=== Cybernetics Conferences ===
The Cybernetics conferences were held between 1946 and 1953, organized by the Josiah Macy, Jr. Foundation, motivated by Lawrence K. Frank and Frank Fremont-Smith of the Foundation. As chair of this set of conferences, Warren McCulloch had responsibility to ensure that disciplinary boundaries were crossed. The Cybernetics were particularly complex as a result of bringing together the most diverse group of participants of any of the Macy conferences, so they were the most difficult to organize and maintain.

The principal purpose of these series of conferences was to set the foundations for a general science of the workings of the human mind. These were one of the first organized studies of interdisciplinarity, spawning breakthroughs in systems theory, cybernetics, and what later became known as cognitive science.

One of the topics spanning a majority of the conferences was reflexivity. Claude Shannon, one of the attendees, had previously worked on information theory and laid one of the initial frameworks for the Cybernetic Conferences by postulating information as a probabilistic element which reduced the uncertainty from a set of choices (i.e. being told a statement is true, or even false, completely reduces the ambiguity of its message).

Other conference members, especially Donald MacKay, sought to reconcile Shannon's view of information, which they called selective information, with their concept of structural information, which signified how selective information was to be understood: a given true statement might acquire additional meanings in varied settings without further communication. The addition of meaning into the concept of information necessarily brought in the role of the observer. MacKay argued that in receiving and interpreting a message, the observer and the received information become indivisible: the receiver interprets the message relative to a preexisting internal state consisting of what is already known.

MacKay further conflated the roles of information and its meaning through the idea of reflexivity and feedback loops. The effect of the original message on the initial observer could be perceived by a second observer mimetically, producing a possibly different interpretation, which could then reflect back on the initial observer or on others ad infinitum. Reflexive feedback loops became prominent during the later discussions on behavioral patterns of the human mind.

Warren McCulloch and Walter Pitts, also attendees, had previously worked on designing the first mathematical schema of a neuron, assuming it had a threshold level of excitation from incoming neurons, which caused it to firie its own signal to others. Similarly to Shannon's arguments on relay and switch circuits, McCulloch and Pitts proved that neural networks were capable of all boolean algebra calculations.

McCulloch proposed that the firing of a neuron can be associated with an event or interaction taking place in the external world which provides sensory stimulus that is then picked up by the nervous system and processed by the neurons. But he also showed how a neural network's signal pathway could be set up reflexively within itself, causing the neurons to fire a 'reverberating' circular feedback loop without any original 'firing' signal or new incoming signals. McCulloch claimed this accounted for conscious phenomena in which individuals' world view, their interpretation of past sensory perception, was cognitively distorted or missing, as seen in individuals with phantom limb syndrome or hallucinations of sensory perception without an external signal. The psychiatrist attendee Lawrence Kubie noted how repetitive and obsessive behaviors in neurotics resembled McCulloch's reverberating loops.

Shannon had developed a maze-solving device which attendees likened to a rat. Shannon's rat was programmed to find its marked goal when dropped at any point in a maze, being able to recall past experience, previous paths it had taken, which often enabled it to find its goal. However, Shannon showed the rat's design was prone to failure caused by reflexive feedback loops. If the rat found itself in a location where its memory failed to recall a previous path to the goal, it could get stuck in an endless loop chasing its tail. Abandoning its goal-oriented design, the rat would seemingly become neurotic.

The conferences failed to reconcile the subjectivity of information (its meaning) with the subjectivity of the human mind, but succeeded in showing how concepts such as the observer, reflexivity, black box systems, and neural networks could not be approached in isolation, but would have to be overcome together to form a complete working theory of the mind.

- First Cybernetics Conference, 8–9 March 1946. Titled "Feedback Mechanisms and Circular Causal Systems in Biological and Social Systems".
- Second Cybernetics Conference, 17–18 October 1946. Title changed to "Teleological Mechanisms and Circular Causal Systems"
- Third Cybernetics Conference, 13–14 March 1947.
- Fourth Cybernetics Conference, 23–24 October 1947. Title changed to "Circular Causal and Feedback Mechanisms in Biological and Social Systems".
- Fifth Cybernetics Conference, 18–19 March 1948
- Sixth Cybernetics Conference, 24–25 March 1949
- Seventh Cybernetics Conference, 23–24 March 1950. Title changed to "Cybernetics: Circular Causal and Feedback Mechanisms in Biological and Social Systems".
- Eighth Cybernetics Conference, 15–16 March 1951
- Ninth Cybernetics Conference, 20–21 March 1952
- Tenth Cybernetics Conference, 22–24 April 1953

Participants: (as members or guests) in at least one of the Cybernetics conferences: Harold Alexander Abramson, Ackerman, Vahe E. Amassian, William Ross Ashby, Yehoshua Bar-Hillel, Gregory Bateson, Alex Bavelas, Julian H. Bigelow, Herbert G. Birch, John R. Bowman, Henry W. Brosin, Yuen Ren Chao (who memorably recited the Lion-Eating Poet in the Stone Den), Jan Droogleever-Fortuyn, M. Ericsson, Fitch, Lawrence K. Frank, Ralph Waldo Gerard, William Grey Walter, Molly Harrower, George Evelyn Hutchinson, Heinrich Klüver, Lawrence S. Kubie, Paul Lazarsfeld, Kurt Lewin, J. C. R. Licklider, Howard S. Liddell, Donald B. Lindsley, W. K. Livingston, David Lloyd, Rafael Lorente de Nó, R. Duncan Luce, Donald M. MacKay, Donald G. Marquis, Warren S. McCulloch, Turner McLardy, Margaret Mead, Frederick A. Mettier, Marcel Monnier, Oskar Morgenstern, F. S. C. Northrop, Walter Pitts, Henry Quastler, Antoine Remond, I. A. Richards, David McKenzie Rioch, Arturo Rosenblueth, Leonard J. Savage, T. C. Schneirla, Claude Shannon, John Stroud, Hans-Lukas Teuber, Mottram Torre, Gerhardt von Bonin, Heinz von Foerster, John von Neumann, Heinz Werner, Norbert Wiener, Jerome B. Wiesner, J. Z. Young

This is a sampling of the topics discussed each year.

1946, March (NYC)
- Self-regulating and teleological mechanisms
- Simulated neural networks emulating the calculus of propositional logic
- Anthropology and how computers might learn how to learn
- Object perception's feedback mechanisms
- Perceptual differences due to brain damage
- Deriving ethics from science
- Compulsive repetitive behavior

1946, October (NYC)
- Teleological mechanisms in society
- Concepts from Gestalt psychology
- Tactile and chemical communications among ant soldiers

1947, March (NYC)
- Child psychology

1947, October (NYC)
- The field perspective on psychology
- Analog vs. digital approaches to psychological models

1948, Spring (NYC)
- Formation of "I" in language
- Formal modeling applied to chicken pecking order formation

1949, March (NYC)
- Are the number of neurons and their connections sufficient to account for human capacities?
- Memory
- An appeal for collaboration between physics and psychology

1950, March (NYC)
- Analog vs. digital interpretations of the mind
- Language and Shannon's information theory
- Language, symbols and neurosis
- Intelligibility in speech communications
- A formal analysis of semantic redundancy in printed English

1951, March (NYC)
- Information as semantic
- Can automatons engage in deductive logic?
- Decision theory
- Feedforward
- Small group dynamics and group communications
- The applicability of game theory to psychic motivations
- The type of language needed to analyze language
- Mere behavior vs. true communication
- Is psychiatry scientific?
- Can a mental event that creates a memory ever be unconscious?

1952, March (NYC)
- The relation of neurophysiological details to broad issues in philosophy and epistemology
- The relation of cybernetics at the microlevel to biochemical and cellular processes
- The complexity of organisms as a function of information
- Humor, communication, and paradox
- Do chess playing automatons need randomness to defeat humans?
- Homeostasis and learning

1953, April (Princeton)
- Studies on the activity of the brain
- Semantic information and its measures
- Meaning in language and how its acquired
- How neural mechanisms can recognize shapes and musical chords
- What consensus, if any, the Macy Conferences have arrived at

Some of the researchers present at the cybernetics conferences later went on to do extensive government-funded research on the psychological effects of LSD, and its potential as a tool for interrogation and psychological manipulation in such projects as the CIA's MKULTRA program.

=== Neuropharmacological Conferences ===
Five annual Neuropharmacological Conferences took place from 1954 to 1959 with a skipped year in 1958. While the conferences have developed a reputation as being primarily about LSD, the drug was discussed extensively at the second conference and was not the primary focus of most of the sessions. In the first conference, for instance, reference to LSD appears only one time, as a side comment during discussion.

First Neuropharmacological Conference, 26–28 May 1954

Participants: Hudson Hoagland (Chairman), Harold A. Abramson (Secretary), Philip Bard (absent), Henry K. Beecher (absent), Mary A. B. Brazier, G. L. Cantoni, Ralph W. Gerard, Roy R. Grinker, Seymour S. Kety, Chauncey D. Leake (absent), Horace W. Magoun, Amedeo S. Marrazzi, I. Arthur Mirsky, J. H. Quastel (absent), Orr E. Reynolds, Curt P. Richter (absent), Ernst A. Scharrer, David Shakow (absent)

Guests: Charles D. Aring, William Borberg, Enoch Callaway III, Conan Kornetsky, Joost A. M. Meerloo, John I. Nurnberger, Carl C. Pfeiffer, Anatol Rapoport, Maurice H. Seevers, Richard Trumbull

Topics: "Considerations of the Effects of Pharmacological Agents on the Over-All Circulation and Metabolism of the Brain" (Seymour Kety) "Functional Organization of the Brain" (Ernest A. Scharrer) "Studies of Electrical Activity of the Brain in Relation to Anesthesia" (Mary A. B. Brazier) "Ascending Reticular System and Anesthesia (Horace W. Magoun) "Observations on New CNS Convulsants" (Carl C. Pfeiffer)

=== Group Processes Conferences ===
The Group Processes Conferences were held between 1954 and 1960. They are of particular interest due to the element of reflexivity: participants were interested in their own functioning as a group, and made numerous comments about their understanding of how Macy conferences were designed to work. For example, there were a series of jokes made about the disease afflicting them all, interdisciplinitis, or how multidisciplinarian researchers were neither fish nor fowl. When Erving Goffman made a guest appearance at the Third conference, he explicitly prefaced his comments by saying that his ideas were partly speculative, and Frank Fremont-Smith responded by stating that their goal was to discuss ideas that had not been crystallized.

- First Group Processes Conference, 26–30 September 1954
- Second Group Processes Conference, 9–12 October 1955
- Third Group Processes Conference, 7–10 October 1956
- Fourth Group Processes Conference, 13–16 October 1957
- Fifth Group Processes Conference, 12–15 October 1960

Participants: (as members or guests) in at least one of the Group Processes conferences: Grace Baker, Donald H. Barron, Gregory Bateson, Alex Bavelas, Frank A. Beach, Leo Berman, Ray L. Birdwhistell, Robert L. Blake, Helen Blauvelt, Jerome S. Bruner, George W. Boguslavsky, Charlotte Bühler, Eliot D. Chapple, Stanley Cobb, Nicholas E. Collias, Jocelyn Crane, Erik H. Erikson, L. Thomas Evans, Jerome Frank, Frank S. Freeman, Frieda Fromm-Reichmann, Erving Goffman, Arthur D. Hasler, Eckhard H. Hess, Sol Kramer, Daniel S. Lehrman, Seymour Levy, Howard Liddell, Robert Jay Lifton, Margarethe Lorenz, Konrad Z. Lorenz, William D. Lotspeich, Ernst Mayr, Margaret Mead, Joost A. M. Meerloo, I. Arthur Mirsky, Horst Mittelstaedt, A. Ulric Moore, R. C. Murphy, Harris B. Peck, Karl H. Pribram, Fritz Redl, Julius B. Richmond, Bertram Schaffner, T. C. Schneirla, Theodore Schwartz, William J. L. Sladen, Robert J. Smith, John P. Spiegel, H. Burr Steinbach, Niko Tinbergen, Mottram P. Torre, William Grey Walter, E. P. Wheeler, II.

== See also ==
- Complex systems
- Cybernetics
- Integrative learning
- Josiah Macy, Jr. Foundation
- Second-order cybernetics
