= Eleanor Woolley Fowler =

American peaceworker

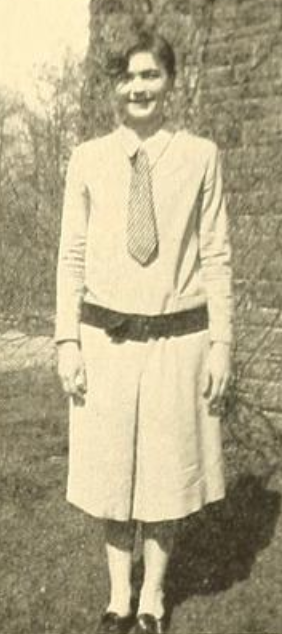
- Eleanor Woolley, later Fowler, from the 1927 yearbook of Bryn Mawr College
- Born: Eleanor Faxon Woolley; August 26, 1907; Chicago, Illinois
- Died: August 19, 1987 (aged 79); Lower Makefield Township, Pennsylvania
- Occupations: Labor activist, peace activist
- Spouse: Cedric Fowler
- Children: 3, including Ann Fowler Rhoads
- Parent(s): Helen Thompson Woolley, Paul Gerhardt Woolley

Eleanor Faxon Woolley Fowler (August 26, 1907 – August 19, 1987) was an American peace and labor activist. She was a national officer of the Congress of Industrial Organizations in the 1930s and 1940s, and of the Women's International League for Peace and Freedom from 1959 to 1972.

== Early life and education ==
Eleanor Faxon Woolley was born in Chicago, the daughter of Paul Gerhardt Woolley and Helen Thompson Woolley. Her father was a physician, and her mother was a psychologist. She graduated from Bryn Mawr College in 1927. She pursued further studies at the London School of Economics and at the Sorbonne, and earned a doctorate in international law at Columbia University.

== Career ==
Fowler was active in the labor movement. She was secretary-treasurer of the Congress of Women's Auxiliaries, the women's organization of the Congress of Industrial Organizations (CIO), and she edited the CIO News during World War II. She was also a member of the legislative staff of the CIO. She testified before the House Committee on Military Affairs in 1942, on the material needs of military dependents during World War II. In 1944 she testified before the Senate Committee on Agriculture and Forestry, in favor of repealing federal taxes on margarine.

Fowler was executive secretary of the Washington, D.C. branch of the American League for Peace and Democracy during the 1930s. She was a national officer of the Women's International League for Peace and Freedom (WILPF) from 1959 to 1972, serving as membership chair and assistant to the executive director, Mildred Scott Olmsted. In 1966, she was the league's acting executive director, after Olmsted retired. She was also the longtime head of the Bucks County chapter of the WILPF.

Fowler visited the Soviet Union twice, attended international conferences including the 1970 WILPF meeting in New Delhi, and joined peace rallies in the United States, including a women's anti-nuclear protest in Washington, D.C. in 1980.

Fowler's political activities brought her under scrutiny from law enforcement and Congressional investigations. "The Communist sympathies, if not the party membership, of Eleanor Fowler are well established by her public record," noted a House committee report in 1944. "She was periodically arrested, convicted, and fined, usually for disorderly conduct," explained her obituary in The Philadelphia Inquirer, which also quoted her as saying "It's all part of making our point."

== Personal life ==
Eleanor Woolley married Canadian-born labor organizer and journalist Cedric Weeden Fowler. They had children, John, Ann, and Jane. Her husband died in 1968. She died from ovarian cancer at her home in Lower Makefield Township, Pennsylvania, in 1987, at the age of 79.
