= Helen Thompson Woolley =

American psychologist (1874–1947)

- Born: Helen Bradford Thompson; November 6, 1874; Englewood, Illinois, U.S.
- Died: December 24, 1947 (aged 73); Havertown, Pennsylvania, U.S.
- Education: University of Chicago
- Children: Eleanor Faxon Woolley

Helen Bradford Thompson Woolley (November 6, 1874 – December 24, 1947) was an American psychologist, known for her contributions to the educational sector, research on sex differences and research methods. Woolley's interest in scientific inquiry was prompted by the work of her father, Paul Thompson, who was an inventor. Woolley's academic achievement and resultant scholarship allowed her to pursue studies in psychology at the University of Chicago.

Woolley's university studies marked the beginning of her career in experimental and applied psychology. Her controversial dissertation, titled The Psychological Norms in Men and Women, attracted the interest and the scrutiny of the scientific world as it was the first major piece of psychological research explicitly examining the similarities and differences of the mental traits of women and men.

Woolley's husband, Paul Woolley, was a determining force in the course of her career, as the constant relocations required by his profession as a physician limited her academic opportunities. Following their wedding, Woolley followed Paul to Japan and subsequently the Philippines, where she started working as a researcher for the Bureau of Education, marking her first endeavour in developmental psychology. Woolley's work in education continued with her involvement in the Vocation Bureau, the Merrill-Palmer School and the Institute for Child Welfare Research at Teachers College, Columbia University.

Woolley's late life was plagued by her deteriorating mental health, which impacted her interpersonal relationships as well as occupational status. At the age of 73, she died of an aortic aneurysm at her daughter's home in Havertown, Pennsylvania.

== Early life ==
Helen Bradford Thompson was born on November 6, 1874, in Englewood, a suburb of Chicago, Illinois. Her father was David Wallace Thompson, (Note: Morse gives her father's name as Paul Thompson.) a shoe salesman and an inventor, producing implements such as burglar alarms, a heat regulating thermostat for a coal furnace, and a letter sorting device, and her mother was Isabella Perkins Faxon Thompson, an active missionary during a time when it was unusual for women to take on interests outside the home. She was the second of three daughters and although her parents supported their education, her elder sister Jane had been forced to leave the University of Michigan after one year due to the financial burden.

Woolley graduated first in her class from Englewood High School in 1893, delivering a valedictorian speech titled "The Advance Towards Individual Freedom by the Aid of Invention", which reflected her inclination towards scientific contributions in social development. Originally intending to be a teacher, she received a scholarship to the University of Chicago and was able to attend by living at home. Morse speculates that the family was likely affected by The Panic of 1893 and that Woolley might not have been able to complete her degree without the scholarship.

== Education ==
Woolley joined the Department of Philosophy, Psychology, and Pedagogy. Although her major was in philosophy, she took courses in neurology and psychology with a particular interest in empirical psychology. She took courses with James Rowland Angell, John Dewey, George Herbert Mead, Henry Herbert Donaldson and James Hayden Tuft while at the university. In her junior year, she was offered scholarships in both physics and psychology by the university, and accepted the psychology scholarship. Upon completion of her undergraduate degree in 1897, Woolley was granted a fellowship for graduate work in psychology, supervised by Angell. She published papers in psychology, philosophy, and neurology during her graduate studies at Angell's encouragement. Woolley graduated summa cum laude with her PhD in 1900 and her performance was lauded two years later to fellow University of Chicago graduate John B. Watson by Dewey and Angell.

Women who completed PhDs in 20th century were proportionate to men in receiving acceptance into professional organizations such as APA, yet their occupational status was incomparable. Women's contributions in academics were significantly under-represented, and academic positions were difficult to be obtained, especially for married women. Upon completion of her PhD, Woolley was recognized by the Association of Collegiate Alumnae and was awarded a European Fellowship. She studied with Carl Stumpf and Arthur Konig in Berlin, and later with Eduard Tulouse and Pierre Janet in Sorbonne.

=== Dissertation ===
Under the direction of Angell, Woolley's doctoral dissertation investigated the performance of 25 males and 25 female university students on "motor ability, skin and muscle senses, taste and smell, hearing, vision, intellectual faculties and affective processes". The thesis was titled "Psychological Norms in Men and Women". Her thesis attracted much attention as it significantly challenged the societal standards of the time. It was the first major scientific experimental research comparing the mental traits of men and women. Woolley adopted the approach of comparing distributions of scores on each test between sexes instead of reporting average performance of all participants. The results supported that men presented higher average performance on motor skills tests, whereas women were better at finer sensory discrimination; women were more skilled in memory and association tasks within intellectual faculties, whereas men had advantage in tests of ingenuity. Woolley accounted the differences between sexes as the characteristics which were most beneficial evolutionarily for sexual reproduction.

Helen Woolley later published her dissertation in The Mental Traits of Sex, where her work was criticized for whether women in her sample were an accurate representation of the sex in general. One criticism was that college women and college men were not comparable because college women are usually of the highest intelligence in their respective families and/or driven by especially strong ambition, while college men follow a generally ordinary trajectory. This was the stereotypical view of educated women during the early 20th century. However, a new class of university educated women began to enter the realms of science and social science and enthusiastically applied their expertise on social and political issues of that time.

== Personal life ==
Woolley met her husband, Paul Gerhardt Woolley in university when she was a senior and Paul was finishing medical studies at Chicago. Soon after meeting, they were engaged and remained engaged for eight years during which time both completed their professional training. After completing their undergraduate studies, Woolley was offered a graduate fellowship and remained in Chicago while Paul left for residency at Johns Hopkins University.

After working in Massachusetts for four years, Woolley left her job and moved to Japan where Paul was working as an epidemiologist. She and Paul were married in Yokohama. Soon thereafter, they moved to the Philippines where Paul directed a laboratory. In the Philippines, Woolley began working for the Bureau of Education, performing research on childhood education and the best years for learning. While Woolley took on this project, Paul took a job in Siam (now Thailand) doing public health work and manufacturing vaccines for smallpox and anthrax. She joined Paul once her project was done.

When Woolley became pregnant, Paul sent her home out of concern for her and the baby's health. At six months pregnant, Woolley took a boat to the West Coast, then taking a train back to her parents’ home, arriving barely six weeks before her first daughter, Eleanor Faxon Woolley, was born on August 26, 1907. Eleanor's birth sparked Woolley's interest in child and developmental psychology.

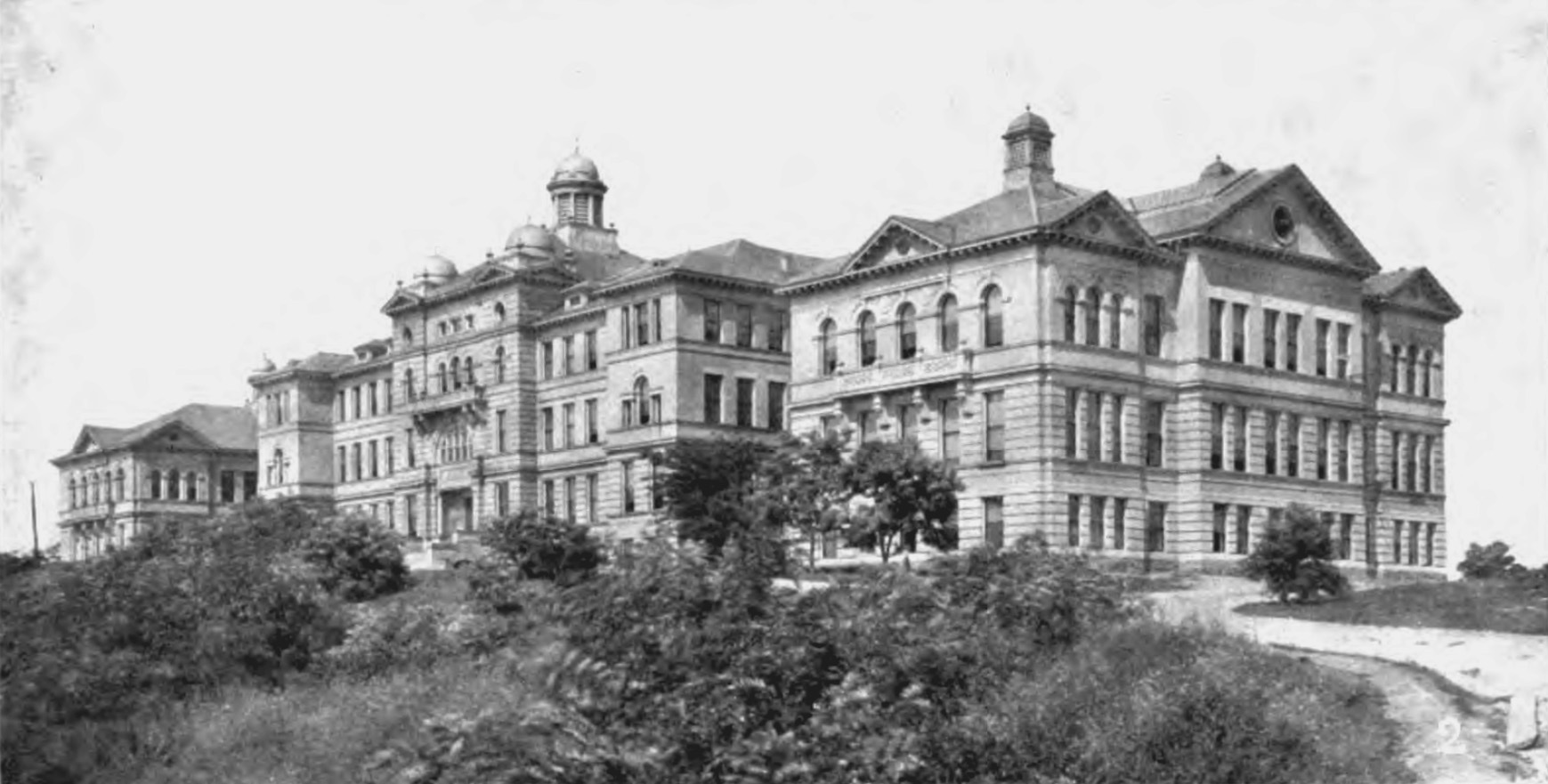
University of Cincinnati in 1918

After spending a year in Omaha, Nebraska the family moved to Cincinnati. Paul began teaching at the medical school, while Woolley was a philosophy lecturer at the University of Cincinnati. However, during their years in Cincinnati, Woolley and Paul drifted apart. Paul eventually took on a job in Detroit running a medical testing laboratory, and Woolley left Cincinnati in 1921 to follow Paul to Detroit.

In 1924, Paul contracted tuberculosis from the diagnostic laboratory and left for a sanatorium in Pasadena, California. Paul Woolley filed for a divorce from Woolley in 1927 with the plans of marrying Millie Thompson (no relation) and eventually died in 1932. Woolley died of a cerebral hemorrhage at age 72 in Pennsylvania on Christmas Eve of 1947.

== Career ==
=== The Vocation Bureau (1911–1921) ===
Helen Woolley was a pioneer in the practical application of developmental psychological principles. As director of the Cincinnati Vocation Bureau, appointed in 1911, she contributed significantly to the understanding of influential factors in the physical and mental development of adolescents. The Vocation Bureau was responsible for the issuance of "working certificates" to children between the ages of 14 and 16 years and therefore provided a wide pool of data for Woolley to successfully conduct her research.

Woolley aimed to establish intelligence tests appropriate for adolescents and the statistical norms to accompany such tests, as well as examine the potential relationship between test and job performance. Woolley compared the performance of 14-year-old subjects who had joined the workforce to subjects regularly attending school classes for the span of four years. After completing an extensive data analysis with her assistant, Charlotte Rust Fischer, Woolley did not find support for her cognitive tests; however, her project increased awareness of the utility of experimental psychology in the advancement of the public-school sector and educational policies. The results of the study were subsequently published in 1926 under the name “An Experimental Study of Children at Work and in School Between the Ages of Fourteen and Eighteen Years”. The Vocation Bureau was expanded to include the testing of children in order to establish class placements.

She was additionally the first woman and first psychologist to be appointed president of the National Vocational Guidance Association in 1921.

=== The Merrill-Palmer School (1921–1925) ===
In an attempt to follow her husband to Michigan, Helen Woolley accepted a position as a psychologist and assistant director at the Merrill-Palmer School in 1921. The Merrill-Palmer School was a nursery school offering courses in child care. The school also represented research initiatives in early child development and attracted a great deal of attention as one of the first laboratory nursery schools in the United States. While Woolley's experimental work within the school was limited, it facilitated a change in her research interests to younger populations of children. She played a part in the Merrill-Palmer scale, which is an intelligence test that was used for many types of children – in nursery schools, clinics, orphanages, and different types of research. Moreover, she expressed concerns with the validity of cognitive testing in young children and emphasized the importance of environmental factors in the development of IQ in such ages.

=== Teachers College (1925–1930) ===
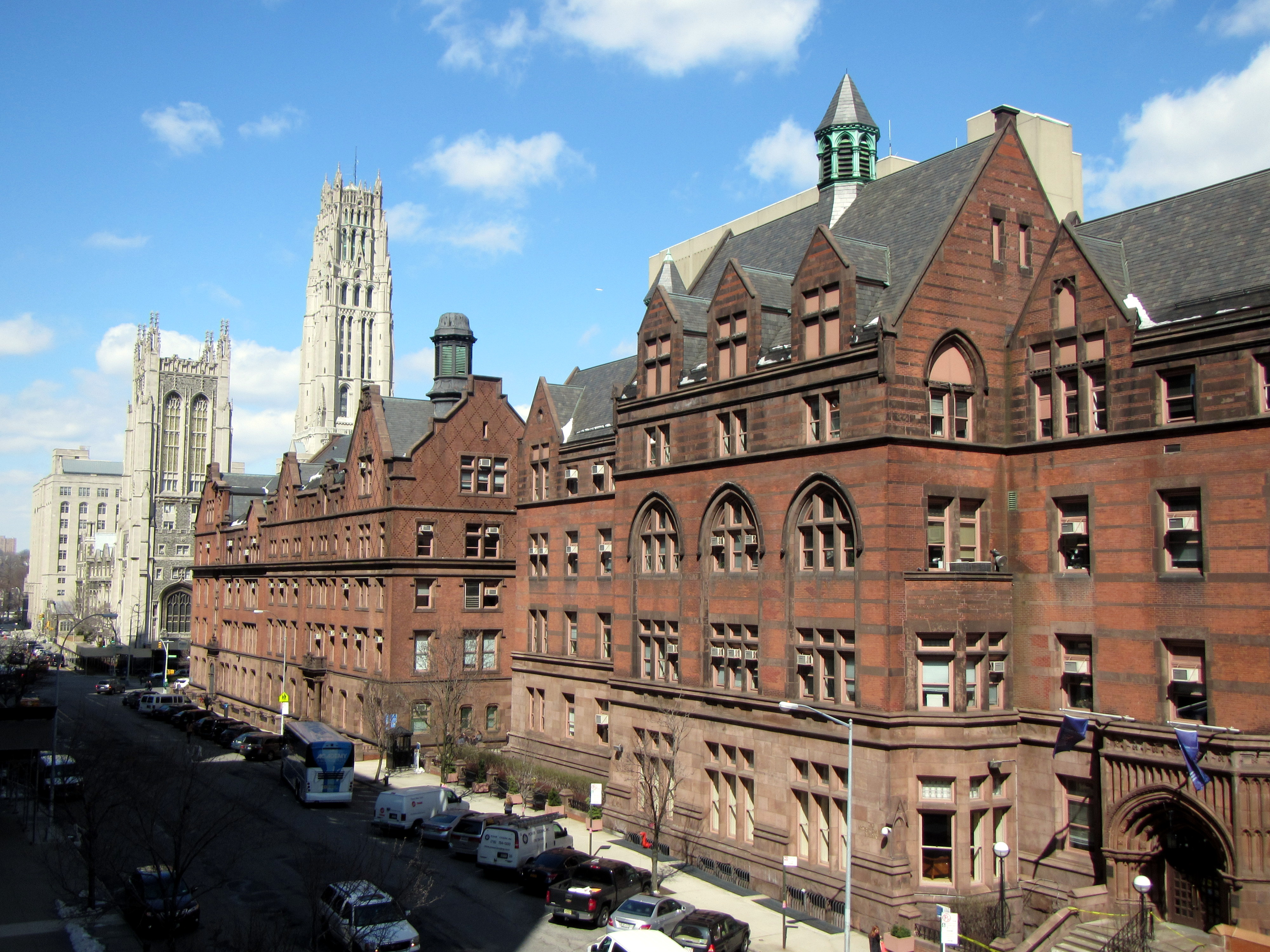
Teachers College, Columbia University in 2013

In May 1925, Helen Woolley received an offer to become a director for the Institute for Child Welfare Research at Teachers College, Columbia University. Woolley became the only woman at the time to become a director of one of the most prestigious research centers. In an attempt to smooth the transition between her position at the Merrill-Palmer School and her new position at Teachers College, Woolley travelled between Detroit and New York from January to June, 1926. By April, 1926, Woolley started receiving criticism from friends and coworkers regarding her work ethics. The director of the Laura Spelman Rockefeller Memorial, Lawrence K. Frank, had interviewed the Dean of Teachers College, James Russell, and reflected on it in a memorandum:

"I told Dean Russell that had been approached by several of Dr. Woolley’s friends with a request that I help her out of the difficulties she was facing and that as nearly as I could understand the matter, Dr. Woolley's temperamental aversion to any disputes or self-assertion put her at considerable disadvantage at Teachers College."

In late May, it was discovered that Woolley had developed an abdominal tumour for which she had to undergo an appendectomy and hysterectomy. During her treatment, Teachers College was kindly supporting Woolley by continuing her salary and paying her medical bills. Despite her health issues, Woolley officially moved to New York in September 1926, and subsequently developed two nursery schools within Teachers College for the purpose of studying early childhood education. She hired about fifteen female graduates to work under her, who developed innovative work on early childhood education and collectively advocated for nursery schools.

The death of her close friend, Bess Cleveland, and her divorce from Paul, were only two of many factors in Woolley's life that caused emotional instability. Woolley took a leave of absence for a year and traveled to various nursery schools in England, Brussels, Vienna, and Geneva in order to gain knowledge on early childhood education in European countries. She resumed her duties in August 1928 and presented two papers at the International Congress of Psychology Conference in Fall 1929.

Woolley was shocked when she was asked to resign in February 1930 by Dean William Russell, son of the previous Dean Russell, who accused her of being a poor teacher and an incompetent administrator. Woolley's accomplishments during her time at Teachers' College included becoming an internationally known researcher and scholar, having multiple publications, and being considered as one of America's top child psychologists by the age of 55. She felt strongly that Dean Russell's statements were untrue. He cited difficulties with her teaching, but Woolley received excellent student evaluations, was an internationally known scholar and researcher, and it was her work and ideas that had made Teachers' College renowned for early childhood education. Woolley harboured resentment towards Dean Russell, and went on to write an 11-paged typescript called, "The Experience of Helen T. Woolley in being employed in Teachers College, Columbia University, and in being dismissed from Teachers College." In May, Dean Russell replied to her claims by identifying multiple errors within her typescript which highlighted Woolley's impaired recollection. Woolley spent the next decade attempting to find work in academia but found no success due to few jobs being available during the Depression and even fewer available for women in academe.

== Emotional and cognitive difficulties ==
Woolley's mental illness was a major factor that led to the end of her career and a lack of recognition on her accomplishments. Woolley's mental breakdown could be dated back to 1927, when her husband divorced her. In addition to the divorce, several incidents happened around the same period which affected the basis of Woolley's life: the hysterectomy and appendectomy for the abdominal tumor, a year of commuting between Merrill-Palmer and Teacher's College, the new job at Teacher's College, the death of her friend, Bess Cleveland, and the separation from her daughters. Subsequently, Woolley took a year off work to recover from her breakdown. By February 1927, she was transferred to the Four Winds Sanitarium in Katonah, New York, due to her severe depression and suicide attempt. Woolley's doctor, Charles I. Lambert, described that Woolley's illness progressed as a normal depression, with some opposite symptoms such as being overactive, over self-assertive and dominant. Lambert did not think that Woolley should continue her job as a teacher because she was emotionally unstable and lack of self-control, had memory impairment, and liked to do things on her own way. However, Woolley thought that she was fully recovered and resumed work in the fall of 1928. Unexpectedly, Woolley was being asked to resign from Teacher's College by Dean William Russell in February 1930 because of her poor teaching and incompetent administration, although she denied having any problem with her duties. After her resignation, she wrote to her old friend Angell and asked for his help in finding a new job. Angell, however, thought that Woolley was not suitable to work due to her serious condition of mental disturbance.

Woolley started writing argumentative letters regarding Dean William Russell's treatment to her in Teacher's College in May 1930. She even went further to write a lengthy typescript to express her anger and dissatisfaction towards Russell. However, the statement contained a lot of errors on the dates and false claims regarding her resignation, reflecting her impaired recollection. In January 1933, Adolf Meyer, a Johns Hopkins psychiatrist, reported that Woolley had an "obsession of vindication" in regard to her resignation in Teacher's College rather than having depression. According to Woolley's daughter, Eleanor Faxon Woolley, Woolley was increasingly getting more paranoid, and further accused William Russell and Edna White of persuading the others not to assist her. Woolley's obsession continued to grow with her mental illness and could not be resolved.

Woolley could not find a job after being dismissed from Teacher's College, which brought her to the end of her career. In Woolley's last years, she became dependent on her daughter, Eleanor. On December 24, 1947, Woolley died of an aortic aneurysm at the age of 73 at Eleanor's home in Havertown, Pennsylvania.

== Publications ==
During the course of her career, Woolley wrote and published three books and around fifty articles. These published works ranged in topic, and although the vast majority of her works were psychology related, she did publish some philosophy and neurology related articles as a graduate student at the University of Chicago. A list of some of her more well-known published works, particularly those published early in her career, can be found below.

- Woolley, Helen Thompson (1907). "Sensory affection and emotion". Psychological Review, 14 (5): 329–344. doi:10.1037/h0074333. ISSN 0033-295X.
  - A review of Carl Stumpf's discussions on affective processes, who insists that sensory affections should be classified a specific class of sensations. Wooley discusses “(1) pain sensations and the pleasure sensations arising in the skin and vegetative organs; (2) the affective tone of higher senses, and (3) applications.” (Woolley, 1907)
- Woolley, Helen Thompson (1910). "The development of right-handedness in a normal infant". Psychological Review, 17 (1): 37–41. doi:10.1037/h0074110. ISSN 0033-295X.
  - Woolley conducted an empirical study on colour vision in a seven-month-old, normal infant. She provides evidence for the theory that identifies the speech centre and right-handedness in the left hemisphere being developed around the same time in an infant.
- Woolley, Helen Thompson (1914). "The psychology of sex". Psychological Bulletin, 11 (10): 353–379. doi:10.1037/h0070064. ISSN 0033-2909.
  - A literature review was conducted on 88 studies regarding the psychology of sex. Various aspects within the study of sex differences have been identified, including heredity, motor ability, memory, attention, and general intelligence, along with the impact of social influences.
- Woolley, Helen Thompson (1915). "A new scale of mental and physical measurements for adolescents and some of its uses". Journal of Educational Psychology, 6 (9): 521–550. doi:10.1037/h0075644. ISSN 0022-0663.
  - Woolley developed a scale that measures the mental and physical capabilities of adolescents, which was tested on 1430 students between the ages of 14 and 15. The scale is successful at comparing different groups and finding a relationship between manual and mental capabilities.
