= Kate Macy Ladd =

- Born: Catherine Everit Macy; April 6, 1863; New York City, New York, U.S.
- Died: August 27, 1945 (aged 82); Far Hills, New Jersey, U.S.
- Occupation: Philanthropist
- Known for: Josiah Macy Jr. Foundation; Natirar estate
- Spouse: Walter Graeme Ladd (m. 1883; died 1933)
- Parent(s): Josiah W. Macy Jr. and Louisa Everett
- Family: V. Everit Macy (brother)

Catherine Everit Macy Ladd (April 6, 1863 – August 27, 1945), known as Kate Macy Ladd, was an American philanthropist who founded and endowed the Josiah Macy Jr. Foundation in honor of her father.

== Biography ==
Kate was born in New York City, a descendant of Thomas and Sarah Macy, Massachusetts settlers in the late 1630s. She was a granddaughter of Captain Josiah Macy, originally of Nantucket, who founded a firm that became New York's first oil refinery in the 1860s (later sold to the Standard Oil Company).

Kate's father died in 1876 at only 39 years old, when Kate was still a teenager. Upon her father's death, she inherited an estimated $15 million (equivalent to $453,516,000 in 2025). She was plagued by some disease or condition; she was described as "an invalid" since her early twenties.

At twenty years old, she married lawyer and yachtsman Walter Graeme Ladd (1857–1933) on December 5, 1883. Walter won several yachting prizes, including some with his schooner, the Etak ("Kate" spelled backwards).

In 1925, she received an honorary Master of Arts degree from New Jersey College for Women.

In 1930, amidst the Great Depression, Ladd created the foundation named for her father with $5 million initial endowment (equivalent to $96,365,000 in 2025) to be used for "preventing and curing disease and relieving human suffering." The foundation was enormously successful. Within 15 years, its endowment had grown to $7 million and it had given away from $4.5 to $5 million to various causes, primarily to universities and agencies around the world. One of its earliest grants was in 1930, to fund a fellowship for a "competent collaborator" for Albert Einstein. The foundation funded research and studies on health topics including the process of aging, endocrinology, nutrition, and convalescent care.

After World War II began, the foundation provided aid for war veterans but also launched specific research into treatments for surgical shock and burns, antibiotics such as sulfa and penicillin, and biological studies on the use of heavy hydrogen. In 1943, with the United States fighting in the Pacific theater, the foundation endowed $150,000 to create a five-year research and teaching in program of tropical medicine at the Columbia-Presbyterian Medical Center. It also invested $1 million into a research service to distribute medical literature to armies and navies of the United States, Canada and the United Kingdom.

In addition to her own foundation, Ladd gave generously to other charities.

She died in 1945 in Far Hills, New Jersey, and left a further $2.5 million to the Macy foundation.

== Natirar estate ==
Beginning in 1908, Ladd provided a convalescent facility at “Maple Cottage,” a large residence on her Peapack-Gladstone, New Jersey estate, Natirar, where “deserving gentlewomen who are compelled to depend on their own exertions for support shall be entertained, without charge, for periods of time while convalescing from illness, recuperating from impaired health, or otherwise in need of rest.” Following Ladd's death in 1945, title to Natirar was conveyed to the Kate Macy Ladd Fund, and the convalescent facility was relocated from Maple Cottage to the renovated main residence on the estate.

In 1983, fifty years after Walter Ladd's death and in accordance with his will, Natirar was sold and was purchased by King Hassan II of Morocco. On the king's death in 1999, it was inherited by his son, Mohammed VI. More recently, Natirar has reopened as Pendry Natirar, part of Montage Hotels portfolio with a spa, second restaurant, and 68-room hotel.
