= Nora Benjamin Kubie =

American writer, artist and amateur archaeologist

Nora Benjamin Kubie (January 4, 1899 - September 8, 1988) was an American writer, artist and amateur archaeologist.

== Biography ==
Born Eleanor Gottheil, she was the daughter of Muriel H. and Paul Gotteil, an executive with the Cunard Line in New York. She graduated from the Calhoun School in New York, delivering the valedictory speech in 1916. Gottheil appears on the Vassar College alumnae list. and was reported by the New York Times as having graduating in 1920 from Barnard College.

Gottheil was married to John J. Benjamin from 1922 until his death in 1936 and she had one son by him. From 1938 to 1949 she was married to the psychoanalyst Lawrence Kubie.

She began her literary career writing nautical stories and juvenile novels, later focusing on Jewish historical fiction and archaeology. She wrote, she said, about things, places, events, and phenomena she knew about personally. Her books about Israel for example, were written after she moved there in the early 1950s, where she lived in Ein Hod, a writers' colony. She traveled throughout the Middle East as an amateur archaeologist and produced an account of the early English explorer, Sir Austen Henry Layard.

As an artist, she illustrated many of her juvenile books. She lived in Westport, Connecticut in her later years and was a member of the MacDowell Colony in Peterborough, New Hampshire. She died of acute leukemia at the age of 89.

The novelist Lincoln Child is a grandson. In his fantasy novel Thunderhead (1998), he modeled the character of Nora Kelly on Nora Kubie.

== Publications ==
- Roving All the Day
- Hard Alee (1936)
- Fathom Five (1939) A history of Bermuda
- Make Way for a Sailor! (1946)
- Remember the Valley (1951) a novel of young love featuring a female protagonist.
- Joel (1952) a novel centered on a Jewish protagonist during the American Revolution.
- The First Book of Israel (1953)
- King Solomon’s Navy (1954)
- King Solomon’s Horses (1956)
- The First Book of Archaeology (1957) a history of the development of archaeology.
- Road to Ninevah: The Adventures and Excavations of Sir Austen Henry Layard (1964; 1965 in the UK)
- The Jews of Israel (1975)
- Israel (1968, 1978) A general introduction.
