= Harold Alexander Abramson =

American physician and LSD researcher

- Born: November 27, 1899; New York, New York
- Died: September 29, 1980 (aged 80); Cold Spring Harbor, New York
- Education: Columbia College (BA); Columbia University College of Physicians and Surgeons (MD)
- Known for: Early advocate of therapeutic LSD
- Scientific career
- Fields: Clinical allergist

Harold Alexander Abramson (November 27, 1899 – September 29, 1980) was an American physician (clinical allergist), remembered as a proponent of therapeutic LSD. He played a significant role in the CIA's MKULTRA program to investigate the possible applications for LSD.

== Biography ==
Abramson graduated from Columbia College in 1919, receiving an M.D. from the College of Physicians and Surgeons in 1923. As a medical student, he was awarded the Meyerhof Prize in 1921. He specialized in allergy medicine.

In the 1920s and 1930s, Abramson traveled widely, and was affiliated with laboratories at Johns Hopkins and Harvard, as well as the Kaiser Wilhelm Institute for Physical Chemistry and Electrochemistry in Berlin. He also began long affiliations with laboratories at Mount Sinai Hospital and Cold Spring Harbor. Returning to P&S, he became assistant professor of physiology from 1935 to 1942 and joined the staff at Mount Sinai Hospital in New York City in 1941, cultivating an interest in asthma and pulmonary disease, and where he was the first ever to use aerosolized penicillin.

In 1942, the Long Island Biological Laboratories research project, headed by Harold Abramson, was established in part with funds from the Josiah Macy Jr. Foundation and support from the War Department. Abramson was then a Major in the Technical Division, Chemical Warfare service of the United States Army.

He was on military leave from 1943 to August 1946, and during this period he earned the United States Army's Legion of Merit "for vital contributions to the Chemical Warfare Service and thus to the war effort" for work involving aerosol penicillin.

He returned to P&S in September 1946, and became Assistant Clinical Professor of Physiology from 1948 to 1957. During the 1950s, Abramson was involved in LSD research conducted at Mount Sinai and funded by the CIA, and he appears in the Church Commission's investigation of CIA practices. His later career was spent at Mount Sinai Hospital and other hospitals in the New York area, finally leaving Mount Sinai Hospital in 1959.

While at Mount Sinai Hospital in 1953, Abramson proposed an $85,000 study to the CIA on the effects of LSD on unwitting hospital patients. This was the same year that the MKULTRA program was established. Funding for the project was funneled through the Josiah Macy Jr. Foundation.

Abramson was an attending physician in connection with the alleged LSD-induced suicide of Frank Olson, a U.S. Army biological warfare scientist who was surreptitiously given LSD as part of the CIA's psychotropic drug research, although the Olson family contests the circumstances of his death.

Beginning in 1954, Abramson published a series of articles on the effects of LSD on Siamese fighting fish. He is said to be the person who influenced many members of the Cybernetics Group to turn to LSD, including Frank Fremont-Smith, head of the Josiah Macy Jr. Foundation. (The Cybernetics Group, originally named The Conference on Feedback Mechanisms in Biology and the Social Sciences, was started in 1946). He was also an organizer of the six international LSD conferences, the first being held in 1959.

On October 31, 1965, he delivered a speech titled "LSD in Psychotherapy and Alcoholism" at the Sixth Emil A. Gutheil Memorial Conference of the Association for the Advancement of Psychotherapy in New York.

Abramson edited the proceedings of the Second International Conference on the Use of LSD in Psychotherapy and Alcoholism, published in 1967 as The Use of LSD in Psychotherapy and Alcoholism. The conference took place at the South Oaks Hospital in Amityville, New York, May 8–10, 1965.

Together with M. Murray Peshkin, he founded the Journal of Asthma Research, and remained its editor for seventeen years until his death.

He also worked as director of research at South Oaks Psychiatric Hospital in Amityville, New York, and a consulting research psychiatrist at State Hospital in Central Islip.

Abramson died on September 29, 1980.

== In popular culture ==
=== WORMWO0D (2017) ===
Abramson was portrayed by Bob Balaban in WORMWO0D, the 2017 six-part docudrama miniseries directed by Errol Morris.

== Selected works ==
Reports

- "Preliminary Data on LSD Aerosols." (1958).
  - Reprinted in Chemical Warfare Secrets Almost Forgotten: A Personal Story of Medical Testing of Army Volunteers with Incapacitating Chemical Agents During the Cold War (1955-1975), by James S. Ketchum. Foreword by Alexander Shulgin, Ph.D. Santa Rosa, California: ChemBooks (2006), pp. 331–333. ISBN 978-1424300808. OCLC 702214684.

Books

- Electrokinetic Phenomena and their Application to Biology and Medicine. American Chemical Society Monograph Series. New York: Chemical Catalog Co. (1934).
- The Patient Speaks: Mother Story Verbatim in Psychoanalysis of Allergic Illness. Foreword by Frank Fremont-Smith. Preface by M. Murray Peshkin. New York: Vantage Press (1956). ISBN 0533043433.

Books (as editor)

- The Use of LSD in Psychotherapy. New York: Josiah Macy, Jr. Foundation (1960). Introduction by Frank Fremont-Smith.
- The Use of LSD in Psychotherapy and Alcoholism. Introduction by Frank Fremont-Smith. Indianapolis, Indiana: Bobbs-Merrill (1967).

"Proceedings of the Second International Conference on the Use of LSD in Psychotherapy and Alcoholism, at the South Oaks Hospital, in Amityville, New York, May 8–10, 1965."

Book contributions

- "Use of LSD as an Adjuvant to Psychotherapy: Fact and Fiction." In: LSD - A Total Study by D. V. Siva Sankar. Westbury, New York: PJD Publications (1975), pp. 687–700. ISBN 0960029036.
