= Lawrence Kubie =

American psychiatrist (1896–1973)

Lawrence Schlesinger Kubie (17 March 1896 – 27 October 1973) was an American psychiatrist and psychoanalyst who practiced in New York City from 1930 to 1959. Kubie had several celebrity patients, including Tennessee Williams, Leonard Bernstein, Moss Hart, Kurt Weill, Vivien Leigh, and Sid Caesar.

== Life ==
After graduating from Harvard College in 1916, Kubie took a medical degree from Johns Hopkins University in 1921 and later became a Freudian psychoanalyst. He was a faculty member at Johns Hopkins University, Columbia University, the Yale School of Medicine, and the New York Psychoanalytic Institute, and was on the staffs of the Neurological Institute of New York and Mount Sinai Hospital.

Kubie wrote two books, Practical and Theoretical Aspects of Psychoanalysis and Neurotic Distortion of the Creative Process, and many articles. He was the editor of The Journal of Nervous and Mental Disease. He was formerly president of the New York Psychoanalytic Society and the American Psychosomatic Society, secretary of the American Psychoanalytic Association, and a member of the New York Academy of Medicine.

In articles of 1930 and 1941, Kubie proposed a theory of 'closed reverberating circuits' underlying neurosis, which was later drawn upon by Warren McCulloch, and discussed by John Z Young at the 9th Macy conference. Kubie attended the Macy conferences from 1942 to 1953. After 1941, he studied hypnosis, particularly in collaboration with Richard Brickner and Milton Erickson, and it was Kubie who invited Erickson to a Macy conference in 1942.

The playwright Tennessee Williams entered analysis with Kubie in 1957. In a New York Review of Books controversy about the treatment, Gore Vidal said that many people of the time saw Kubie as 'a slick bit of goods on the make among the rich, the famous, the gullible.' Vidal charged Kubie with attempting to discourage Williams from his homosexuality, though John Lahr's biography of Williams disputes the claim.

Kubie married Susan Hoch in 1921 and had three children by her, one of whom died in infancy. In 1938, Kubie remarried the writer Eleanor Gottheil Benjamin; they divorced in 1949. From 1962 to 1963, Kubie was married to Evelyn Bigelow Clark. Kubie died on October 27, 1973, in Baltimore.

== Partial list of publications ==
- A Theoretical Application to Some Neurological Problems of the Properties of Excitation Waves Which Move in Closed Circuits, Brain 53(2): 166–177, 1930.
- « Repetitive Core of Neuroses », in Psychoanal. Quart., 1941
- « The use of induced hypnagogic reveries in the recovery of repressed amnesic data », in Bull Menninger Clin, 7, 1943
- « Communication between sane and insane : Hypnosis » in Cybernetics: Transactions of the Eighth Conference; Josiah Macy Jr. Foundation, New York (Heinz von Foerster, Margaret Mead, Hans Lukas Teuber), 1952
- « Psychiatric and psychoanalytic considerations of the problem of consciousness » in J.F. Delafresnay (dir.) Brain mechanisms and consciousness, a symposium, Springfield, 1954
- Neurotic Distortion of the Creative Process, New York : Noonday Press, 1958
- « L'hypnotisme. Terrain de choix pour les recherches psychophysiologiques et psychanalytiques » in Arch. gen. Psychiat., 1961, repris dans Rev. Ned. Psychosom., 1963
- « Theoretical aspects of sensory deprivation » in P. Solomon (dir.) Sensory Deprivation: A Symposium Held at Harvard Medical School, 1961
- « The concept of dream deprivation : A critical analysis », Psychosom. Med., 1962
- « Missing and wanted : Heterodoxy in psychiatry and psychoanalysis : Editorial », J. nerv. ment. Dis., 1963
- « The relation of psychotic disorganization to the neurotic process », L. Amer. psychoanal. Ass., 1967
- « The nature of psychological change and its relation to cultural change », in B. Rothblatt (dir.), Changing perspectives on man, Chicago, 1968
- « Multiple fallacies in the concept of schizophrenia », J. nerv. ment. Dis., 1971
- (fr)« L'illusion et la réalité dans l'étude du sommeil, de l'hypnose, de la psychose et du réveil », in The International Journal of Clinical and Experimental Hypnosis, 1972, repris dans Revue médicale psychosomatique, 2, 1976 et dans Léon Chertok (dir) Résurgence de l'Hypnose: une bataille de deux cents ans, 1984

With Milton H. Erickson

- « The use of automatic drawing in the interpretation and relief of a state of acute obsessional depression », Psychoanalytic Quarterly, 7, 1938, p. 443-466
- « The permanent relief of an obsessional phobia by means of communications with an unsuspected dual personality », Psychoanalytic Quarterly, 8, 1939, p. 471-509
- « The translation of the cryptic automatic writing of one hypnotic subject by another in a trance-like dissociated state », Psychoanalytic Quarterly, 9, 1940, p. 51-63
- « The successful treatment of a case of acute hysterical depression by a return under hypnosis to a critical phase of childhood », Psychoanalytic Quarterly, 10, 1941, p. 583-609

With Sydney G. Margolin

- (fr) « A physiological method for the induction of states of partial sleep, and securing free association and early memories in such states », Trans. Amer. Neurol. Ass., 68, 1942, p. 136-139
- « An apparatus for the use of breath sounds as a hypnagogic stimulus », American journal of psychiatry, 100, 1944, p. 610
- « The process of hypnotism and the nature of the hypnotic state », American journal of psychiatry, 100, 1944, p. 611-
