= Howard Liddell (psychologist) =

Howard Scott Liddell (November 1895–October 1962) was an American professor of psychology who was involved in the Macy Conferences.

Liddell graduated from the University of Michigan in 1917. After completing his MA, he moved to Cornell University as an instructor, completing his Ph.D. in 1923 and becoming an assistant professor in 1926. In 1930 he was appointed Chairman of Department of Physiology in the Medical College He became professor of Psychology in 1939 and then professor of Psychobiology in 1947. The Behavior Farm Laboratory which he founded at Cornell University was renamed the Liddell Laboratory of Comparative and Physiological Psychology after his death.

Liddell attended a lecture by Gleb Anrep, a former assistant of Ivan Pavlov given at Cornell in 1923. In 1924, following Anrep's advice, Liddell went on to set up a laboratory modelled on that of Pavlov. He experimented on pigs, dogs, sheep, goats, and rabbits. Liddell then visited Pavlov's original laboratory in Leningrad in 1926 and again in 1934 at the time of his publication of Comparative Psychology. He had been able to induce an experimental neurosis in otherwise normal sheep by 1927.

Liddell was guest speaker at the Cerebral Inhibition Meeting in May 1942.

== Publications ==
- Comparative Psychology (1934)
- Conditioning and Emotions (Reprinted from Scientific American) (1954)
- Emotional Hazards in Animals and Man (1956)
