= James Vincent Coyle =

Senior Civil Servant in Northern Ireland

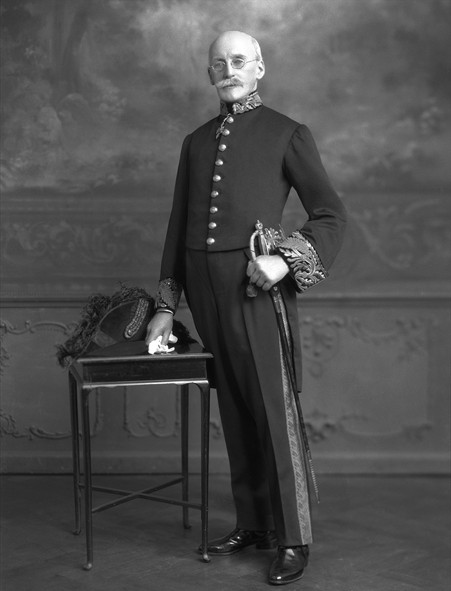
James Vincent Coyle C.B.E., B.L.

James Vincent Coyle C.B.E., B.L. was a senior Civil Servant who served as Assistant Secretary in the Ministry of Agriculture in Northern Ireland between 1921 – 1930.

== Early life ==
Coyle was born at 7 Lower Ormond Quay, Dublin on 15 December 1864, the eldest son of Charles Coyle (Secretary of the Catholic Cemeteries Committee) and Anna Maria Duggan - and the grandson of James Coyle of Ballintemple, County Cavan.

Coyle was the older brother of Joseph Alfred Terence Coyle (known as Alfred Bernard Coyle), who founded Coyle & Co. insurance brokers in 1903 (later Coyle Hamilton - now part of the Willis group).

=== Education ===
Coyle – like his two brothers - was educated by the Jesuits at Belvedere College, Dublin, before studying law at Trinity College Dublin. In the University Calendar for 1889, he was listed as having passed general examinations in 1888 in Civil Law, Feudal and English Law, and International Law; and in the University Calendar for 1897, he was listed as having passed examinations in 1896 in Civil Law, and Constitutional and Criminal Law, and was listed as one of the prizemen in Civil Law in those exams.

Coyle was called to the Irish Bar (King's Inns, Dublin) in 1896.

== Civil Service ==
=== Collector-General’s Office ===
In 1884, Coyle entered the Collector-General of Rates Office, Dublin, having come first in the examination for Junior Clerks held on 25 August 1884. He was First Class Clerk therein between 1892 – 1900.

=== Department of Agriculture ===
On 5 October 1900, Coyle was appointed to the staff of the Department of Agriculture and Technical Instruction, where he continued to serve until 1921. During that period, he held the following senior positions:

1914-1921:

Principal Staff Officer and Deputy Chief Clerk.

1919-1921:

Chairman Agricultural Wages Board, Ireland.

=== Ministry of Agriculture, Northern Ireland ===
Between 1921 and 1930, Coyle served as Assistant Secretary, Ministry of Agriculture, Northern Ireland.

In 1926, he was appointed a Commander of the Order of the British Empire.

=== Other appointments ===
Coyle was one of the founding members of the Belvedere Union in 1906 and served as President, 1931 -1932.

He also served as Chairman of the Committee of Management, Peabody Sanatorium, County Dublin, 1934 - 1943.

== Family ==
In 1889, Coyle marred Grettie Mary O'Sullivan, daughter of J. O'Sullivan of Drumcondra, Dublin and had seven sons:

- Charles John Reginald Coyle (1891-1973)
- Gerald Coyle (1893-1894)
- Dr. Cecil Dermot Coyle (1894-1993)
- Fr. Rupert Francis Austin Coyle SJ (1896-1978)
- Vincent Ignatius Roderick Coyle (1900-1943)
- Eoin Cyril Gerard Donal O'Sullivan Coyle (1905-1987)
- Fr. Desmond Alfred James Coyle SJ (1912- 1962)

Coyle died on 5 July 1948 and was buried in the Coyle family plot in Glasnevin Cemetery, Dublin.

== Societies ==
- Royal Dublin Society
- Zoological Society of Ireland
- Royal Ulster Agricultural Society, Belfast

== Arms ==
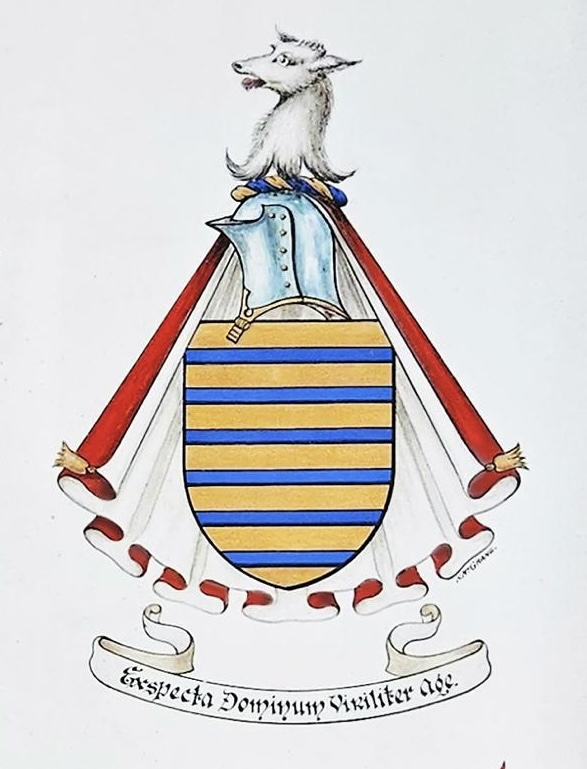
Arms confirmed on James Vincent Coyle C.B.E., B.L.

By Letters Patent dated 15 September 1935, Sir Nevile Wilkinson, Ulster King of Arms (acting through his Deputy, Thomas Sadleir) confirmed arms on Coyle and his descendants, and on the other descendants of his father Charles Coyle, on the basis of long user.

Escutcheon:

Or six barrulets azure

Crest:

A hind’s head erased proper

Motto:

Exspecta Dominum Viriliter Age (wait for the Lord, act like a man)
