= V. Everit Macy =

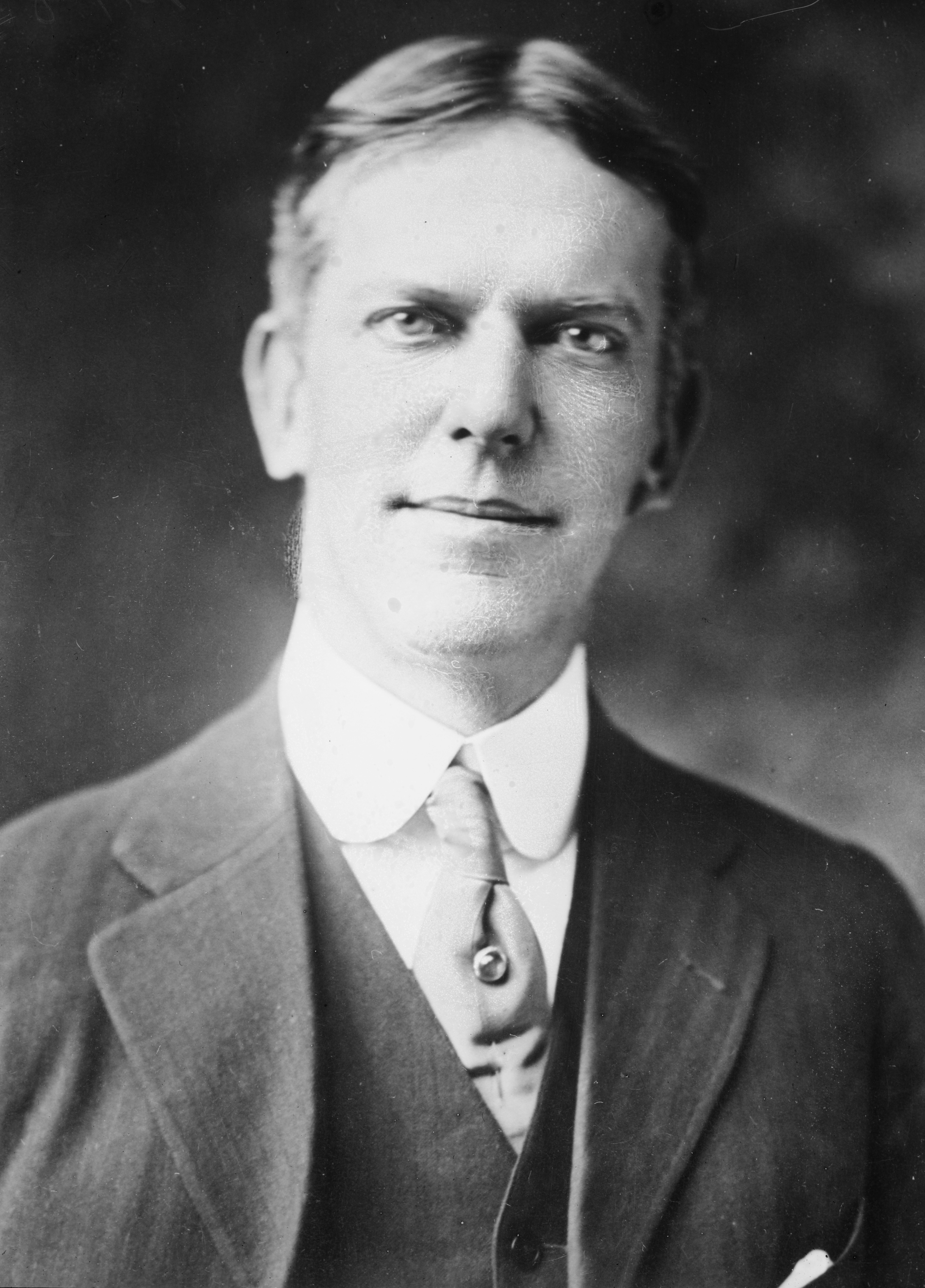
- Macy in 1918
- Born: Valentine Everit Macy; March 23, 1871; New York City, New York, U.S.A.
- Died: March 21, 1930 (aged 58); Phoenix, Arizona
- Education: Columbia University
- Occupations: industrialist and philanthropist
- Spouse: Edith Wiseman Carpenter
- Children: Josiah Noel Macy, Valentine E. Macy, Jr., Edytha Carpenter Macy (Lewis) (Mickles) Gross
- Parent(s): Josiah Macy Jr. and Louisa Everett
- Family: Kate Macy Ladd (sister)

Valentine Everit Macy (March 23, 1871 – March 21, 1930) was an American industrialist and philanthropist, involved in local government. In the 1910s and 1920s, he served in Westchester County, New York, as commissioner of the Department of Charities and Corrections, the Commissioner of Public Welfare, and as Commissioner of Parks.

== Biography ==
=== Early years and education ===
Macy was born in 1871 to Josiah Macy Jr. and Louisa Everett. His father was an officer in Standard Oil. He was named for his maternal grandfather, a Brooklyn leather merchant. His great-grandfather Josiah Macy had been a prominent shipping magnate on Nantucket. The Macy family had founded an oil company which built the State of New York's first oil refinery near Long Island City. Everit's father, Josiah Macy Jr., sold out to the Standard Oil trust and served on that company's board. His mother, Caroline Macy, was a benefactor of Columbia University, donating the funds to build Macy Hall. His sister was Kate Macy Ladd, a prominent philanthropist.

At the death of his father in 1876, the five-year-old V. Everit Macy inherited over $20 million (approximately equivalent to $604,688,000 in 2025). He was interested in design and architecture from an early age, and studied architecture at Columbia University, though he never practiced. He received his undergraduate degree from the Columbia Graduate School of Architecture, Planning and Preservation with the class of 1893.

=== Public service and philanthropy ===
Macy served as the commissioner of the Westchester County, New York, Department of Charities and Corrections from 1913–19, as Commissioner of Public Welfare in 1925, and as Commissioner of Parks from 1926-30. He also served as president of the National Civic Federation.

He would later serve on the board at Teachers College, Columbia and would also serve as its president. He was a major benefactor of Teachers College, donating funds to build the Morningside Heights building that houses the Horace Mann School.

In 1925, Macy gave land in memory of his wife for the construction of the Girl Scouts' Camp Edith Macy.

== Personal life ==
Macy's wife, the former Edith Wiseman Carpenter, was a prominent member of the Girl Scout National Board of Directors and a founding member of New York's Cosmopolitan Club. Macy and his wife had two sons and a daughter, Josiah Noel Macy, Valentine E. Macy Jr., and Edytha Carpenter Macy.

Macy died in a Phoenix, Arizona hotel on March 21, 1930, two days before his 59th birthday.

== Legacy ==
His home at Tannersville, New York, known as Hathaway, was listed on the National Register of Historic Places in 2008. A 172-acre public park in Westchester County, New York, was named after him.
