= Josiah Macy Jr. =

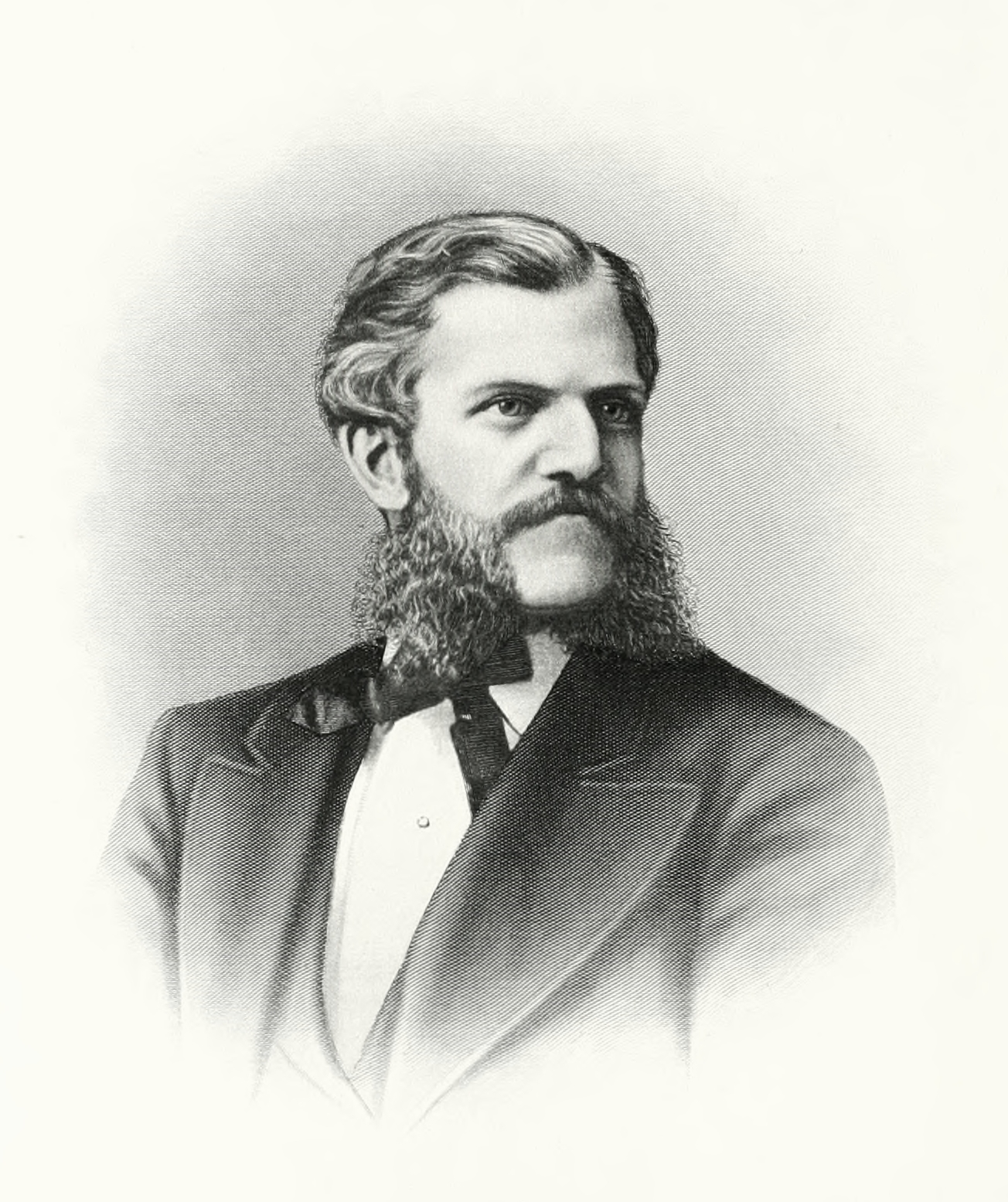
- Born: c. 1837; New York City, U.S.
- Died: October 5, 1876 (aged 38–39); Harrison, New York, U.S.
- Occupations: Sea captain and Philanthropist
- Spouse: Caroline Louisa Everett
- Children: Mary K. Macy Willets, Kate Macy Ladd, and V. Everit Macy

Signature
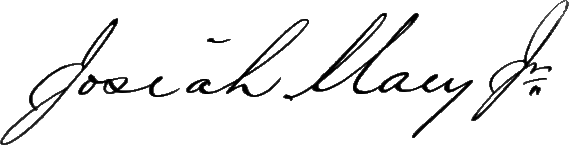

Captain Josiah W. Macy Jr. (c. 1837 – October 5, 1876) was an American sea captain and philanthropist.

== Biography ==
Macy was born into a philanthropic family. After leaving the family home in Nantucket, Massachusetts, where his family had settled during the early 17th century, the elder Josiah W. Macy established a shipping and commission firm in New York City, Josiah Macy & Sons. The Macy family eventually opened one of the first oil refineries in New York, which was later acquired by John D. Rockefeller's much larger Standard Oil Company. Following the acquisition, Josiah Macy Jr. became a high-level executive in Standard Oil and an original shareholder in the company. Holding thousands of Standard Oil shares, he became an immensely wealthy individual and a well-known philanthropist.

Macy's eldest daughter Mary K. Macy (later Willets), born in 1860, died in 1893. His daughter Catherine "Kate" Everit Macy (1863–1945) continued the Macy family's philanthropic habits throughout her entire life, and by the time of her death in 1945, the Josiah Macy, Jr. Foundation had received about $19 million from her and her estate. Macy's son V. Everit Macy (1871–1930) was a prominent statesman in Westchester County, New York, and a benefactor of Teachers College, Columbia University. Macy's wife, Caroline Louisa Everett, lived from December 1838 to December 31, 1898.

Josiah W. Macy Jr. died from typhoid fever at his estate in Harrison, New York on October 5, 1876. Upon his death, his thirteen-year-old daughter Kate inherited $15 million, while his five-year-old son V. Everit inherited over $20 million.

Josiah W. Macy Jr.'s grand mansion, Greystone Castle, was located on historical Millionaires' Row near Irvington, in New York's Westchester County. It burned to the ground in 1976, and the site was later redeveloped into the Greystone-on-Hudson luxury community. He also owned Sunnyridge Farm in Harrison, New York.

== Josiah Macy Jr. Foundation ==
The Josiah Macy Jr. Foundation was endowed in the name of Captain Josiah W. Macy Jr. by his daughter (Catherine "Kate" Everit Macy) in 1930. Time magazine in 1930 reported that the Foundation created a fellowship "to pay the expenses of an assistant for Albert Einstein. First incumbent will be Dr. Einstein's good friend and familiar, Dr. Walter Mayer, mathematician at the University of Vienna."
