= Arturo Rosenblueth =

Mexican researcher, physician and physiologist

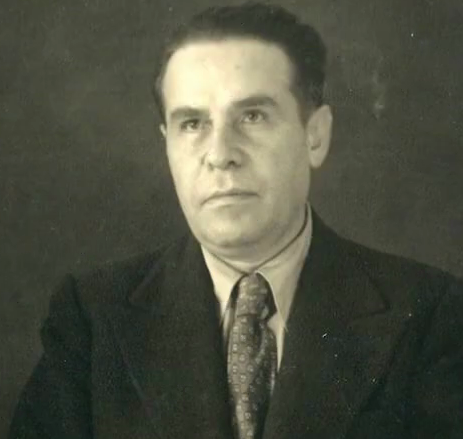
Arturo in the 1940s

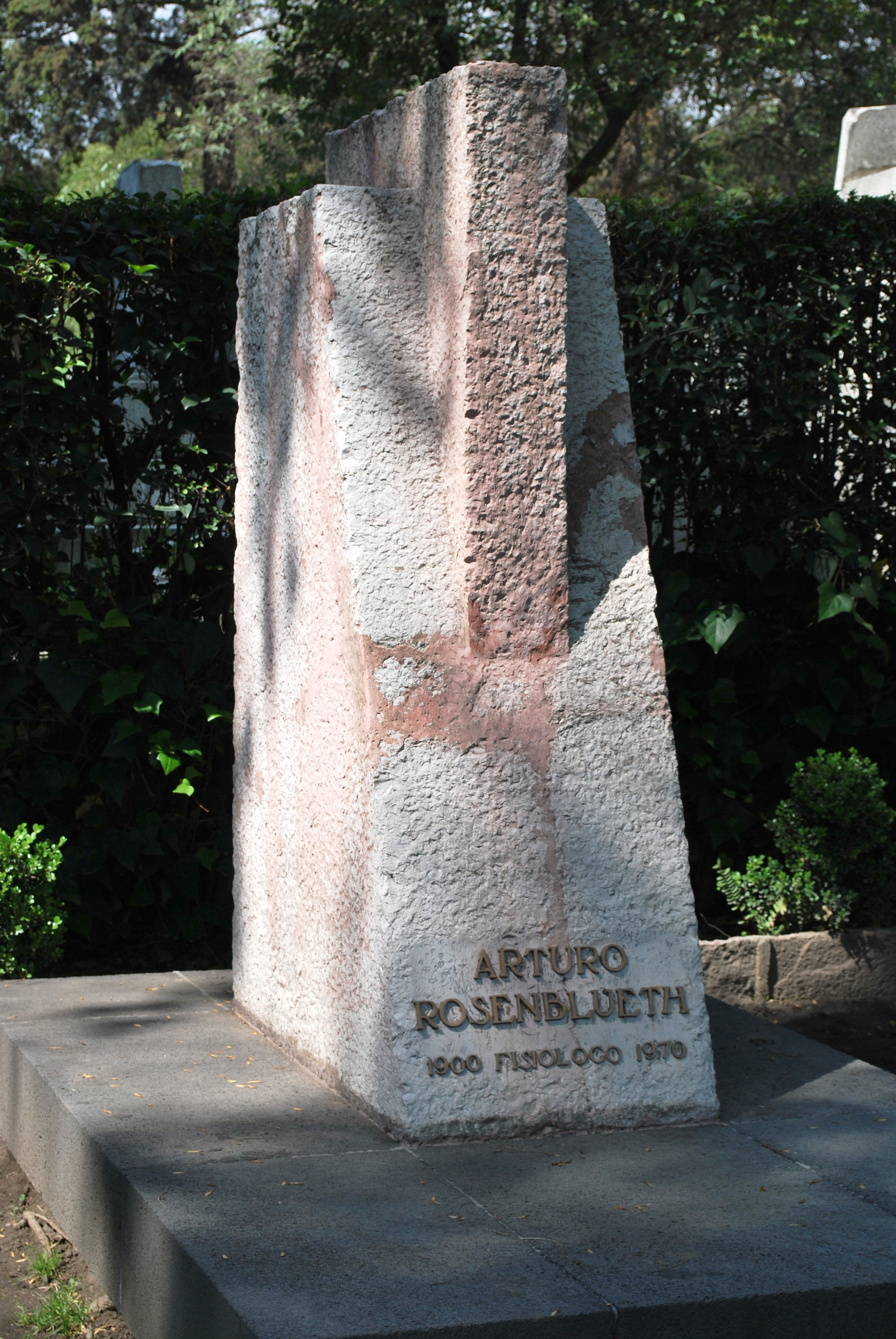
Tomb of Arturo Rosenblueth at the Panteon Civil de Dolores cemetery in Mexico City.

Arturo Rosenblueth Stearns (October 2, 1900 Chihuahua – September 20, 1970 Mexico City) was a Mexican researcher, physician and physiologist, who is known as one of the pioneers of cybernetics.

== Biography ==
Rosenblueth was born in 1900 in Ciudad Guerrero, Chihuahua. He was born to a Hungarian-Jewish émigré and an Irish-American mother who had patrilineal Hungarian-Jewish ancestry as well. He began his studies in Mexico City, then traveled to Berlin and Paris where he obtained his medical degree. Returning to Mexico City in 1927, he engaged in teaching and research in physiology. In 1930, he obtained a Guggenheim Scholarship and moved to Harvard University, to work in the department of Physiology, then directed by Walter Cannon. With Cannon he explored the chemical mediation of homeostasis. Rosenblueth cowrote research papers with both Cannon and Norbert Wiener, pioneers of cybernetics. Notably he was the lead author for the 1943 article 'Behavior, Purpose and Teleology' that was co-written by Wiener and Julian Bigelow and which was published in Philosophy of Science. Rosenblueth was an influential member of the core group at the Macy Conferences.

In 1944, Rosenblueth became professor of physiology at the National Autonomous University of Mexico. Eventually he became head of the Physiology Laboratory of the National Institute of Cardiology, head of the Physiology Department and, in 1961, director of the Center for Scientific Research and Advanced Studies (Cinvestav) at the National Polytechnic Institute.

Between 1947 and 1949, and again between 1951 and 1952, using grants from the Rockefeller Foundation, he returned to Harvard to further collaborate with Wiener.

Arturo Rosenblueth died on September 20, 1970, in Mexico City.

== Work ==
Since the 1930s Rosenblueth worked with Cannon on issues related to Chemical transmission among nervous elements. Between 1931 and 1945 he worked with several specialists, among them Cannon, del Pozo, H.G. Schwartz, and Norbert Wiener. With Wiener and Julian Bigelow he wrote "Behavior, Purpose and Teleology", which, according to Wiener himself, set the bases for the new science of Cybernetics.

In his 1943 cybernetic classification "Behavior, Purpose and Teleology", purpose is a behavior subclass. Behavior is active or passive and active behavior is purposeful or random. Active purposeful behavior is then either feedback teleological on non-teleological. Negative feedback is important to guide the positive goal route. Purposeful teleological feedback helps guide the predictive behavior orders. Teleology has a feedback controlled purpose.

Rosenblueth's classification system was criticized and the need for external observability of purposeful behavior was established to validate the behavior and goal-attainment. The purpose of observing and observed systems is respectively distinguished by the system's subjective autonomy and objective control.

He devoted himself to the fields of nervous impulse transmissions, neuromuscular transmission, synaptic transmission, the propagation of impulses in the heart, the control of blood circulation, and the physiology of the brain cortex. However, he also taught several courses in mathematics and even musicology.

=== Quotes ===
- "[T]he best material model for a cat is another [cat], or preferably the same cat." in The Role of Models in Science with Norbert Wiener
- "To Arturo Rosenblueth for many years my companion in science" Norbert Wiener's dedication in Cybernetics: Or Control and Communication in the Animal and the Machine
- "The price of metaphor is eternal vigilance." with Norbert Wiener quoted by R. C. Leowontin

== Publications ==
- 1937: (with Walter Cannon) Fisiología del sistema nervioso autónomo ("Physiology of the Autonomous Nervous System")
- 1943: ( with Norbert Wiener & Julian Bigelow) Behavior, Purpose and Teleology
- 1945: ( with Norbert Wiener) The Role of Models in Science,
- 1970: Mind and Brain: A Philosophy of Science, (MIT Press)
- 1970: Mente y Cerebro: una filosofía de la ciencia
