= Josiah Macy Jr. Foundation =

U.S.-based educational charity

The Josiah Macy Jr. Foundation
- Founded: 1930
- Founder: Kate Macy Ladd
- Type: Non-profit
- Purpose: Medical education
- Headquarters: 44 East 64th Street
- Location: New York, NY
- Region served: United States of America
- Website: macyfoundation.org

The Josiah Macy Jr. Foundation, or Macy Foundation, is a private, philanthropic grantmaking organization founded in 1930 by Kate Macy Ladd (1863–1945) in honor of her father, Josiah W. Macy Jr. It is the only national foundation dedicated solely to improving the education of health professionals.

== History ==
Since 1930, the Josiah Macy Jr. Foundation has worked to improve health care in the United States. The Macy Foundation's guiding principle is that health professions education has, at its core, a strong social mission to serve the public's needs and improve the health of the public.

Founded by Kate Macy Ladd in memory of her father, prominent philanthropist Josiah Macy Jr., the Foundation originally focused its initiatives on medical research.

== Overview ==
The Macy Foundation frequently hosts conferences that convene experts and leaders in the areas of medical and health professions education. Starting in the late 1940s, the Foundation became internationally known for its Macy conferences: a series of interdisciplinary meetings of scientists and others focused on important topics in medicine. Early conferences played an important role in the foundation of cybernetics.

== See also ==
- Macy conferences
