= New Cybernetics (Gordon Pask) =

New Cybernetics, as used by cybernetician Gordon Pask, is the meaningful transfer of information between coherences in all media in terms of attractions and repulsions between clockwise and anti-clockwise spins. This is a possibly defining paradigm of the new cybernetics or second-order cybernetics.

== Outline ==
Unfoldment of coherences of recursively packed concepts by the repulsive "carapace" forces of like concepts and coalescence by the attraction of unlike concepts is a further feature. Pask's approach involves a psychodynamic and panpsychic element. He achieved this by placing co-ordinates on a participant rather than claiming non-participant observer status. Stafford Beer similarly regarded his Viable System Model as a model of the observer. Pask was liberal in his approach (he eschewed "flag waving" claims). He advocated that students and practitioners use his tools if they found them applicable. His introduction to Graham Barnes' 1994 collection of essays on psychotherapy and second-order cybernetics Justice, Love and Wisdom stated:

I may claim some fundamental expertise both in the "old" and the congruent but significantly advanced "new" cybernetics. It is on the "new", rather than the "old" (of black boxes and input/output relations), that Graham Barnes explicates this illuminating, relevantly informative, insightful and highly innovative book.

Barnes regarded himself as a participant therapist. At the time Pask had completed work on his first draft of "Interactions of Actors (IA) Theory and Some Applications" and was working on his final paper "Heinz von Foerster's Self-Organization, the Progenitor of Conversation and Interaction Theories". There he introduced spin-spin forces as the agents of self-organization, learning and evolution.

The old cybernetics has been elaborated ad infinitum. The new cybernetics (some call it second-order cybernetics in contrast to the first order of classical black boxes and negative feedback) is burgeoning well beyond the bounds of respectability which were imposed by the establishment. If interaction, albeit interrupted by a phone call or a business trip, is unfettered in intellectual flow, I call it a conversation which leads to an exchange of concepts, not necessarily of the topic, but of the participants. It may or may not be about whatever is the alleged topic of conversation. Later we consider interaction of a broader kind, the interaction of actors. Conversations are events which have a beginning and have an end and may be subdivided into kinematic portions, in contrast to interactions of actors which cannot.

For some years in talks with his research students he had mentioned the "hard carapace" (see Gordon Pask for diagram). He defined this carapace as a stability criterion for concepts (persisting countably infinite packed recursive spins that produce relations in any medium). He further claimed that there were "No Doppelgangers". The small differences between coherences were later seen as productive of differentiation in evolution and learning. These small differences or incommensurabilities are ultimately aggregative as Pask's last theorem showed "Like concepts repel, unlike concept attract". These small differences may not manifest for extended periods. In the strictly field concurrent world of IA theory a communicated concept has opposite spin to its source concept.

A dispersive (e.g. Fourier) transform might be applied to disclose the spin spectra in a particular context from a particular perspective. For many years, he discussed these distinctions in his conversation theory, insisting that his p-individuals could exist in a single m-individual, where communication was synchronous or in many m-individuals where p-individuals were coherent collections of concepts and m-individuals where the media supporting these states, communicated asynchronously or via a Petri net token protocol.

He regarded IA as a process theory and his Actors were eternal, supporting the production of all bounded products (e.g. conversations, descriptions or describable coherences) with their forces. His position with regard to the Copenhagen interpretation and Bohr complementarity was captured in Pask's complementarity principle: "Products are produced by processes and all processes produce products". In his final paper, he remarked that a conversation had a particle aspect, which recipient's recompiled to form meaning or affective emotion.

Of the many-worlds interpretation of quantum mechanics he says: "Theories of many universes, one at least for each participant—one to participant A and one to participant B—are bridged by an analogy. As before, this is the truth value of any interaction: the metaphor for which is culture itself".

In some respects, Pask's new Cybernetics is an evolution of Freud and Jung's ideas of psychodynamics and the doctrines of panpsychism. Among the ancients Thales' speculations can be seen in Pask's work. Rather than the Boltzmann distribution as fundamental to the model, possible coalitions of concepts in all media produce a distribution of Stirling numbers of the second kind and their forces of interaction.

Kwabena Boahen estimates the currents in the brain sum to around 100 amps (10 watts at 0.1 volts). These currents (100 coulombs/sec) produce concurrent, changing attractions and repulsions: a dynamic equilibrium of compression and tension. Pask was interested in the prismatic tensegrity as a means of analyzing these concurrent forces.
