= Gerard de Zeeuw =

Dutch scientist

Gerard de Zeeuw (born 11 March 1936) is a Dutch scientist and Emeritus professor Mathematical modelling of complex social systems at the University of Amsterdam in the Netherlands. He is known for his work on the theory and practice of action research, particularly on the "Problems of increasing competence", "Second order organisational research" and "Three phases of science: A methodological exploration".

== Biography ==
=== Youth and study ===
De Zeeuw was born in 1936 in Banjoewangi Indonesia, in the former Dutch Indies in a middle-class family. Part of the Second World War he and his family were imprisoned in Japanese prison camps. In secondary school he was introduced to science by Free Van Heek, Professor of empirical sociology at the Leiden University, who motivated him to use his own library and write a paper, his first, on action and action research.

De Zeeuw studied at the Leiden University from 1955 to 1962, obtaining degrees in Mathematics, Statistics and Econometrics. In 1961–1962 he continued his studies at the Erasmus University under Jan Tinbergen, obtaining a degree in Econometrics. At the Stanford University in 1963–1964 he studied mathematical psychology under Patrick Suppes en Bob Estes and finished his PhD exam. Back in the Netherlands at the University of Amsterdam in 1973 he received his Ph.D. with the thesis titled Model thinking in psychology.

=== University of Amsterdam ===
De Zeeuw served most of his academic career at the University of Amsterdam, where he had started in 1964 and retired in 2006. In 1971 he was Senior Researcher at the Psychological Laboratory of the University of Amsterdam, and in 1974 he was appointed full professor in Research methodology, specifically in the fields of adult education, social work and social helping, community development and social theory. In 1993 he became Professor of Mathematical modelling of complex social systems. At the University of Amsterdam he has been dean of the Faculty of Andragogy, Chair of the department of research methodology in the Faculty of Psychology, and Board member of the university.

Since 1994 he has been visiting professor at the University of Lincolnshire and Humberside in the area of systems and management, and at the London School of Economics in the field of social and organizational psychology. De Zeeuw also lectured at the Agricultural University of Wageningen for three years. He was elected twice as Fellow of the Netherlands Institute for Advanced Study (NIAS) in Wassenaar, the Netherlands. Since 2006 he is Senior Professor of Architectural Design Research at the University of Leuven at the Sint Lucas School of Architecture.

Among his former students are Debiprasad Dash and Hector Ponce, editors of the Journal of Research Practice, and John McManus Professor and Chair of Leadership and Development at York St John University.

=== Other scientific work ===
In 1970 Albert Hanken and De Zeeuw co-founded the Dutch Systems Group with De Zeeuw as its first president. The Dutch Systems Group, the Society for General Systems Research and others in 1980 founded the International Federation for Systems Research with George Klir as their first president until 1986, and Gerard de Zeeuw as third president from 1992 to 1994.

He was a significant contributor to cybernetics, including the development of interactions of actors theory with Gordon Pask.

He is on the Advisory Board of the International Institute for General Systems Studies. He is extraordinary member of the Dutch Institute of Psychologists, for his efforts to promote the study of psychology, and honorary member of the United Kingdom Systems Society. He organized more than 100 conferences, in different disciplines.

De Zeeuw served on the Editorial Boards of the journals of Statistica Neerlandica and Systemica, and was editor-in-chief of the latter. In the 1990s he became associate editor of the Systems Research and Behavioral Science and of the Journal of Research Practice in 2005.

== Work ==
=== "Problems of increasing competence", 1985 ===
The concept of competence is a requiring theme in De Zeeuws work. In his first 1985 paper about this, titled "Problems of increasing competence", De Zeeuw focussed on the growing complexity of society, and the problems around individual competence and social competence. He introduced the problem as follows:

Societies maintain many systems that help order individuals' activities. Some are technical, some economical, etc. Systems designed to remove or prevent social ills form a special class. They restrict or enhance certain types of collective competence: To help solve, variedly and flexibly, individuals' problems. Finding ways for systematic enhancement turns out to be difficult...

In his 1985 paper De Zeeuw proposed a "the concept of a support system" as:

... a research tool to strengthen such collective competence. The concept focuses on the users of systems. How can they achieve or increase specific forms of collective competence—either by themselves, or helped by research?

In 1986 De Zeeuw further explained about the role of science to increase competence. To do so, he explained:

... it must reflect on its own procedures, and must design research methods that are suited to the problems of increasing competence, also via the implementation of new social systems. This turns out not to be easy. Procedures which for example lead to the possibility of prediction are not useful for increasing collective competence.

In response Francis Heylighen (1988) described that "a general theory of the dynamics and stabilization of distinctions based on the closure concept could help us to solve our own complex problems. Practically such an application could be implemented as a computer-based support system... which would help actors to structure their problems, ideas and information, by recombination and closure of simple components." Furthermore, Jan Kooistra (1988) stipulated the problem of "the absence of a terminology". He noted:

The absence of a terminology is not a problem of the absence of truth for things that cannot be named, but the problem of the incompatibility in principle between, on the one hand, the need to order and, on the other, the result of an ordering, as this incompatibility is expressed in the procedure of particular inclusion and exclusion.

In 2002 Kooistra added, that "this quote represents the dilemma De Zeeuw was – and still is – trying to by-pass during his scientific life. How to judge the quality of reasoning in the social sciences whereas you are part of the same system?"

=== Theory of communication systems ===
Following the reflexive turn of the mathematical theory of communication of Claude Shannon, signals could be considered as messages with expected information value, with applications also to social science theory. A linguistic turn was added by the Cybernetics work of Niklas Luhmann, Gordon Pask and De Zeeuw in relation to the uncertainty and meaning of a social message. Luhmann considered language as the operator of social systems and operating system of society while Pask emphasised language's reflexive function in the social system. Gerard de Zeeuw elaborated this paradigm by emphasizing "languages" and "reports" rather than for "laws" and "facts" in a social science design. De Zeeuw submitted that language is the evolutionary achievement which enables us to communicate using two channels for the communication at the same time: a statement can be provided with a meaning and it is expected to contain information.

== Publications ==
De Zeeuw has written a dozen books and more than 150 articles. Books, a selection:

- de Zeeuw, Gerard, and Willem A. Wagenaar. Are subjective probabilities probabilities?. Springer Netherlands, 1974.
- Gordon Pask and Gerard de Zeeuw. Interactions of actors, theory and some applications . Manuscript. In, 1 1992.
- R. Glanville and G. de Zeeuw, (eds.) Interactive Interfaces and Human Networks, 1993.

Articles, a selection:

- De Zeeuw, Gerard. "Problems of increasing competence". Systems Research 2.1 (1985): 13–19.
- de Zeeuw, Gerard. "Soft knowledge accumulation, or the rise of competence". Systems Practice 5.2 (1992): 193–214.
- de Zeeuw, Gerard. "Values, science and the quest for demarcation". Systems Research 12.1 (1995): 15–24.
- De Zeeuw, Gerard. "Three phases of science: A methodological exploration". Centre for Systems and Information Sciences (1996).
- de Zeeuw, Gerard. "Constructivism: a 'next' area of scientific development?" Foundations of Science 6.1–3 (2001): 77–98.
