= Annetta Pedretti =

Architect and cybernetician (1954–2018)

- Born: 1954; Celerina, Switzerland
- Died: 2018 (aged 63–64)
- Education: Architectural Association School of Architecture; Brunel University of London (PhD)
- Known for: Cybernetics
- Scientific career
- Fields: Architecture; Design
- Thesis: The cybernetics of language (1981)

Annetta Pedretti (1954-2018) was an architect associated with second-order cybernetics, and a student of Gordon Pask.

She is known for her long-term design project refurbishing a house at 25 Princelet Street in Spitalfields, now called the House of Annetta. She moved into the house in 1980. After her death in 2018, it was entrusted to Stiftung Edith Maryon, who have continued to develop it as a community resource with the architecture collective Assemble.
