= Conversation theory =

Cybernetic and dialectic framework

Conversation theory is a pedagogical, dialectical, and cybernetic framework that examines conversation, cognition and learning in the context of two conversational participants who attempt to establish what is meant by a topic during a conversation. In effect, each participant attempts to converge towards a common understanding with the other as to the significance of the said topic between themselves. (Note: For Gordon Pask's main works of conversation theory, see Pask (1975a), Pask (1975b), and Pask (1976) respectively.) The theory provides a formal dialectical framework that examines how conversational participants may modulate the conceptualisation processes of each participant throughout a conversational interaction.

A conversational interaction is characterised as a shared learning process: Each participant takes turns within the interaction—switching at intervals between the role of a student or the role of a teacher—to achieve a state of mutual understanding between themselves. In this sense, the theory concerns itself with how two a priori asynchronous cognitive systems—either mechanical or organic in nature—are able to converse and conceptualise about a topic, in such a way that each system achieves the a posteriori synchronization of each cognitive system's particular perspective or attitude towards said topic. This resultant synchronization allows each conversational participant to satisfy some shared task or goal.

Conversation theory provides an experimental framework that heavily utilizes both human-computer interaction frameworks and computer-theoretic models, in order to create a testable framework explaining how conversational interactions may lead to the emergence of shared knowledge between participants. The theory was developed by Gordon Pask, who worked with Bernard Scott, Dionysius Kallikourdis, Robin McKinnon-Wood, and others during its initial development and implementation. (Note: Pask (1976) also notes other contributors including: Brian Lewis, Robin Bailey, David Ensor, Tony Newton, Valary Robinson, Robert Newton, Elizibeth Pask, V. Midora and N. Green.) Ranulph Glanville and Paul Pangaro also contributed to the application and implementation of the framework in subsequent periods.

== Overview ==
Conversation theory is a formal theory—with practical applications—describing how conversation modulates conceptualisation processes between conversational participants. Both experimentation and learning exercises are enacted in the practical application of the theory, in order to verify if a consensus has been established between conversational participants in relation to some aim or goal. (Note: Tilak et al. (2024) for example, provides design considerations for both search engines and educational technology with conversation theory as a theoretical base. Meanwhile, Battle (2023) suggests we may use conversation theory as a framework for designing computational agents, using Large Language Models, to emulate and build shared knowledge representations via dialogue.) The theory prioritizes analysing learning and teaching approaches related to education, rather than other concerns about conversational forms. Historically, Gordon Pask and his associates at System Research Ltd., attempted to examine the learning and intellectual development of conversational participants by means of human-machine interactions; thereby sufficiently providing a psychological framework with educational technological applications. Pask's initial motivation for developing conversation theory, was to study and evaluate the nature of cybernetic inquiry via a cybernetic framework. (Note: In order to achieve this, Pask incorporated a variety of psychological, pedagogical and philosophical influences, such as Lev Vygotsky, R. D. Laing and George H. Mead and others.For further information see Laurillard (2002, p. 87), Tilak & Glassman (2022) and Scott (2021).)

=== Conversation ===
A conversation—in the context of conversation theory—involves a learning exchange between conversational participants. Because of this, participants engaging in a discussion about a subject matter make their knowledge claims explicit through the means of various conversational transactions. (Note: According to Dubberly & Pangaro (2009), conversation is distinguished from the mere exchange of information as seen in information theory, by the fact that utterances are interpreted within the context of a given perspective of such a learning system. It is postulated that if one conversational participant is to be aware of another participant's conception of a topic, then both participants must be able to converse with each other about that topic in such a way that it can be demonstrated that there is a common understanding as to the significance said topic.) Since meanings are agreed during the course of a conversation, and since purported agreements can be illusory—whereby each conversational participant may assume a shared understanding of a given topic with their partner which may then be verified as false—an empirical approach to the study of conversation would require stable reference points during such conversational exchanges between peers so as to permit reproducible results.

Using computer theoretical models of cognition, conversation theory can document these intervals of understanding that arise in the conversations between two participating individuals, such that the development of individual and collective understandings can be analysed rigorously. In this way, Pask has been argued to have been an early pioneer in AI-based educational approaches: Having proposed that advances in computational media may enable conversational forms of interactions to take place between man and machine.

==== Strict Conversation ====
The types of languages that conversation theory demarcates in its approach include (i) language regarding the experiment itself and (ii) languages used by the experimental participants during the course of an experiment. Within conversation theory, a dialogue is said to display different modalities: This is based on how an observer chooses to frame a language under observation within the context of an experiment. The types of languages considered in conversation theory are as follows: Natural languages used for general discussions outside of the experiment; object languages which are the subject of inquiry during an experiment, and finally the metalanguage which is used to talk about the design, management, and results on an experiment.

For the purposes of experimentation and observation, all conversational transactions within a given interaction under observation take the form of a strict conversation: That is, a conversation where (i) there is an agreement to limit the conversational engagement to a finite number of topics, and (ii) there exists some experimenter who documents each iteration of a participant's ongoing understanding of a given topic during a conversation. Such strict conversations are monitored though a cooperative externalisation technique (CET) which involves participants agreeing to externalise their—normally private—cognitive events within the context of a strictly observable experiment.

Each experiment operates under the principle of there existing a CET heuristic. This heuristic refers to the assumption—held by both the experimenter and each participant of the strict conversation—that (i) one participant is able to correctly interpret another participant's understanding of a topic through constructing an explanation of said topic, and (ii) that such an understanding persist for the remainder of a given conversational interaction.

==== Object Language ====
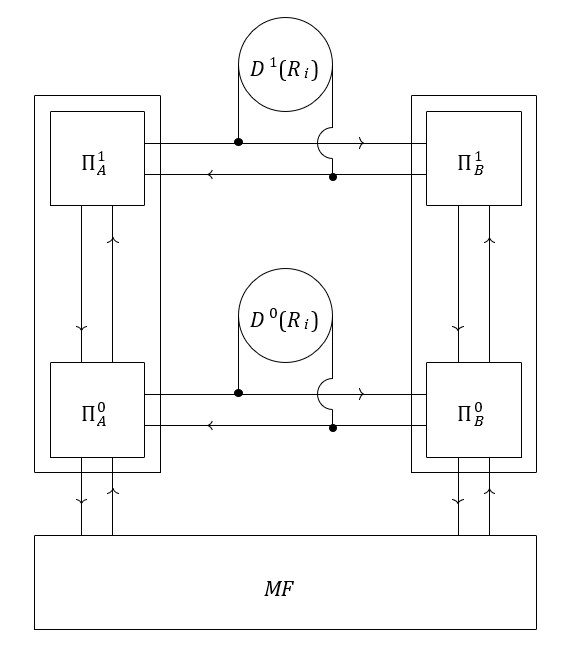
A depiction of a conversational skeleton. The conversational skeleton consists of procedural repertoires $\Pi$, which are processing units that modulate the input and output, speech-acts or descriptions of topic relations $D(R_{i})$, and a modelling facility $MF$ where conversational participants attempt to build working models to satisfy some problem.

The object language $L$ differs from most formal languages, by virtue of being "a command and question language[,] not an assertoric language like [a] predicate calculus". It priorities the sematic and pragmatic aspects of language rather than the syntactical features of propositions and their corresponding truth or falsity values. It is often formally illustrated and embodied in the form of a conversational skeleton within conversation theory, which forms the basic unit of a conversational interactions between a collection of conversational participants $Z= \langle A, B \rangle$. This unit is contextualized as an extended learning system whose internal states are changed and modulated through the course of the conversation.

Since conversation theory specifically focuses on learning and development within agents capable of cognition and conversation, the object language is separated into two distinct modes of conversing; a likeness of which, resembles the distinction between procedural knowledge and declarative knowledge in epistemology. Firstly, there is conversation which happens at the level of $L^{0}$ of an object language, which is concerned with "how to “do” a topic: how to recognize it, construct it, maintain it and so on". Meanwhile, the $L^{1}$ level of an object language is "concerned with explaining or justifying what a topic means in terms of other topics". This is expressed by the ordered-pair $L= \langle L^{0}, L^{1} \rangle$.

The conversational architecture which embodies an object language consists of the following components: Firstly, there are topic relations which may be discussed; secondly, there are speech-acts or descriptions that may be used to converse about said topics; thirdly, a series of procedural repertoires which act to modulate conversational and activity-based input and outputs, and finally a modelling facility whereby conversational participants may collaboratively build working models of a topic with each other. These components—when put together in the form of a conversational skeleton—provide the most basic unit of conversation within conversation theory.

==== Command and Question Language ====
The object language is also a language of commands and questions within conversation theory. In essence, this framing merely highlights another modality of the object language: One that frames the object language in terms of the type of speech acts that may be used when enacting different levels of itself. In a conversation between $A$ and $B$, if the later participant acknowledges the former participant's statements of intent as corresponding to a command or question if they view that behaviour as legal within the confines of the conversational interaction.

On level $L^{0}$of the command and question language, the use of both commands and questions are active: Commands at this level are intended to direct the recipient to act in ways that may generate solutions to a problem, while the use of questions is intended to generate explanations from the recipient regarding what they are doing in a given activity. On level $L^{1}$ of the language meanwhile, the use of both commands and questions are reflective: The intent of commands is to get the recipient to construct a model that describes what they have done, while the use of questions is intended to get the recipient to provide a step-by-step explanation as to how it was solved and to check if any errors of incompatible relations occurred in the construction of the model.

There are three basic conversational transaction types within the language, which include: Commands, questions, and explanations. There also exist cognitive procedures simply known as executions. Such cognitive procedures operate and are enacted upon a modelling facility, which may allow conversational participants to co-design via the synthesis of partial models and some working model. Meanwhile, if such cognitive procedures are to be converted to a speech-act or description $D$ of some topic relation, then such an utterance would also be composed of linguistic expressions that help compose its sense.

Below is a table of operation types that may be enacted within a conversational interaction:

Conversational Operations
Operation	Type	Logical Abbreviation	Formal Definition	Transformational Structure
Command	Conversational transaction	$\begin{array}{lc} \\ Comm \\ \ \end{array}$	$D(R)=<Z! \ Exec \ R \ |\ Precon>$	$Comm_{A} \ \Rightarrow \ Exec_{B}$
Question	Conversational transaction	$\begin{array}{lc} \\ EQuest \ \\ \ \end{array}$	$D(R)=<Z! \ Expl \ R \ |\ Precon>$	$EQuest_{A} \Rightarrow Expl_{B}$
Explanation	Conversational transaction	$\begin{array}{lc} \\ Expl \ \\ \ \end{array}$	$D(R)=<\alpha,\beta,\gamma,...,R>$	$Expl_{A} \ \Rightarrow PROC_{B}$
Execution	Cognitive procedure	$\begin{array}{lc} \\ Exec \\ \ \end{array}$	$PROC(R)=<a,b,c,...,M>$	$PROC_{A} \Rightarrow \ D_{A}$

The operations are characterised above as either (i) conversational transactions which are used to induce conceptualisation, or (ii) cognitive procedures which enact conceptualisation procedures so that the contents of such conceptualisation can be applied in the form of some speech-act or utterance. Both conversational transactions and cognitive procedures have transformational structures that are intended by a conversational participant to induce a given behaviour in the other.

Both commands and questions of the type $D(R)$ have the following basic form, which is taken from Nicholas Rescher's formalisation of The Logic of Commands (1966):

$D(R) \ = \ < Z! \ X \ |\ Y \ >$

Where $Z!$ obligates the addressee or receiver of the command or question to act in accordance with the intention of the messenger, and $|$ is a conditional relation. Therefore, the expression $X \ | \ Y$ can be read as "Do X, given Y". In terms of speech-acts which take the form of commands and questions, they may sufficiently take the form of the below expressions:

$\begin{array}{lcl} Comm \ i & = & < Z! \ Exec_{Z} \ i \ |\ Precon \ > \\ EQuest \ i & = & <Z! \ Expl_{Z} \ i \ |\ Precon \ > \end{array}$

For example, if some conversational participant $A$ issues a command to conversational participant $B$ then the utterance would take the form of "Attention Addressee! Do such-and-such, in relation to so-and-so" or "Attention Z! Do such-and-such, given this parameter". However, not all operations in the command and question language are prescriptive. For example, providing explanations to others, or executing actions within a modelling facility do not prescribe that the other participant act but are processes that build a conceptual model or attempt to convey it within a conversation.

$\begin{array}{lcl} Expl \ i & = & <\alpha,\beta,\gamma,...,R> \\ Exec \ i & = & <a,b,c,...,M> \end{array}$

Where for the first operator the Greek letters—e.g., $\alpha, \beta, \gamma$—designate a series of linguistic expressions that help compose the sense of a topic relation within an explanation, and where for the second operator there exist a series of partial models—e.g., $a, b, c$—and the derived working model $M$ that form the process of some execution.

=== Concepts ===
The term concept in conversation theory is contextualised differently to other uses of the term concept. It has been argued that in conversation theory a concept is not a mental representation nor an abstract idea nor is it strictly speaking an ability—as commonly articulated within the subfield of conceptual ontology. While it has properties which intersect with all these ontologies, a concept is treated in conversation theory in terms of a non-localised process which attempt to maintain the coherence of some set of relations with themselves in the face of incompatibilities.

A concept is not the product of such a process—such as a symbol or mental coordinate—but an ongoing process of feedback which produces, maintains and modulates some set of topics. It is also not a class, nor description of a class, nor a stored description: Instead, a concept is specifically used to reconstruct, reproduce or stabilize relations. In this sense, they may be sufficiently conceived as mental organisations or working models that hold a hypothesis and seek to test said hypothesis in order to confirm or deny its validity. (Note: Manning (2023a, pp. 49–50) notes this notion of a concept has been noted as formally resembling a TOTE cycle discussed by Miller, Galanter and Pribram. Following from this point, Tilak (2023) further argues that Pask believed Miller's model had been "carelessly applied to analogize the mind and computer programs without considering [the] possibility of recursive circularity between problem-solvers of varied competence iteratively supplementing each other's understandings" (p. 31).)

==== Formal Structure ====
Strictly speaking, a concept in conversation theory—as described by Pask—is conceived of as the production, reproduction, and maintenance of a given topic relation $R_{i}$ via other topic relations belonging some conversational domain $R$. This implies that all topic relations—within some area of a conversational domain—must mutually entail each other through a cyclic process of reciprocation. (Note: This implies that when $R_{i}, R_{j} \in R$, that: $\begin{array}{c} R_{i} \vdash R_{j} \\ R_{j} \vdash R_{i} \end{array}$ Whereby the respective indexical subscripts are used to represent some order of number upon a finite index of numbers.)

Now if we let $R_{H}$ denote some arbitrary head topic relation that may be discussed, then it is considered identical to a procedural working model of said relation that produces it.

$R_{H}=PROC(R_{H})$

In which a working model of said relation is treated as identical to its concept:

$PROC(R_{H})=CON(R_{H})$

And where a concept is defined as an operation that is substitutable for the below ordered-pair:

$CON \triangleq PROC=\langle PROG, INTER \rangle$

Whose contents are defined as:

$\begin{array}{lcl} INTER & \triangleq & \lambda(x) \\ PROG & \triangleq & \pi(x) \end{array}$

Such that a program is defined as a calculus or set of rules $\pi$ that operates on some input, and an interpretation is conceived of as a compiler $\lambda$ that attempts to compile said input into an executable form. A concept—as thus defined—is considered by Pask to be an $L$-procedure or process, which is embodied by its underlying processor called an $L$-processor. When said form has been compiled by said processor, then the concept may be executed to produce a topic relation, which may be sufficiently written as:

$AP(\lambda(\pi(R_{H})))=AP(CON(R_{H}))\Rightarrow R_{H}$

Which represents one such representation of the basic logical form of a concept within conversation theory. In later work, Pask envisaged conceptualisation as a parallel rather than a serial process: That within a conversational system, conversations may or may not be taking place at any given time. (Note: See for example, the unfinished interaction of actors theory manuscript of Pask & De Zeeuw (1992).) Because of this, he demarcates the application operator $AP$ and the execution operator $\&$ to indicate when the activation of a concept is necessarily activated or when it is sufficiently activated within a conversational system.

==== Protologic ====
The protologic or protolanguage (simplified often as Lp), is a sister theory of conversation theory which contains a system of rules of inference governing conceptual formulation and modulation. The rules and principles governing conceptualisation within the protologic are often illustrated as entailment structures, which are representational snapshots that may help visualize an organized and publicly available collection of resultant knowledge within conversation theory. The entailment structure a graph composed of a series of nodes and arrows representing a series of topic relations and the derivations of such topic relations.

===== Entailment Derivation =====
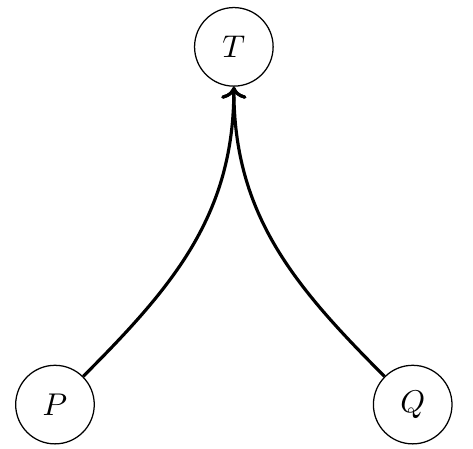

===== Collective Derivation =====
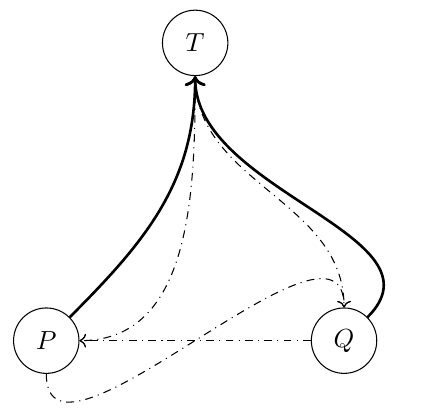

===== Disjunct Derivation =====
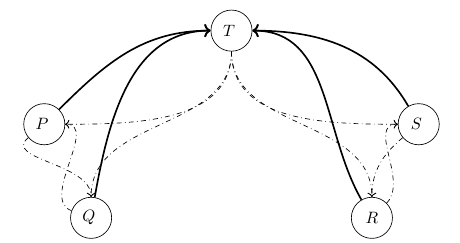

===== Analogy Derivation =====
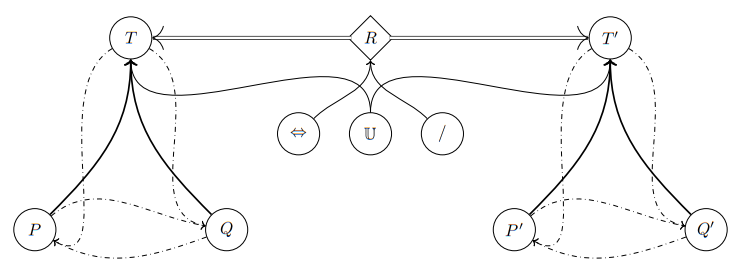

=== Cognitive Reflector ===
From conversation theory, Pask developed what he called a "Cognitive Reflector". This is a virtual machine for selecting and executing concepts or topics from an entailment mesh shared by at least a pair of participants. It features an external modelling facility on which agreement between, say, a teacher and pupil may be shown by reproducing public descriptions of behaviour. We see this in essay and report writing or the "practicals" of science teaching.

Lp was Pask's protolanguage which produced operators like Ap which concurrently executes the concept, Con, of a Topic, T, to produce a Description, D. Thus:

$AP(CON)\Rightarrow D(T)$

where => stands for produces.

A succinct account of these operators is presented in Pask Amongst many insights he points out that three indexes are required for concurrent execution, two for parallel and one to designate a serial process. He subsumes this complexity by designating participants A, B, etc. In Commentary toward the end of Pask, he states:

The form not the content of the theories (conversation theory and interactions of actors theory) return to and is congruent with the forms of physical theories; such as wave particle duality (the set theoretic unfoldment part of conversation theory is a radiation and its reception is the interpretation by the recipient of the descriptions so exchanged, and vice versa). The particle aspect is the recompilation by the listener of what a speaker is saying. Theories of many universes, one at least for each participant A and one to participant B are bridged by analogy. As before this is the truth value of any interaction; the metaphor for which is culture itself.

=== Learning strategies ===
In order to facilitate learning, Pask argued that subject matter should be represented in the form of structures which show what is to be learned. These structures exist in a variety of different levels depending upon the extent of the relationships displayed. The critical method of learning according to Conversation Theory is "teachback" in which one person teaches another what they have learned.

Pask identified two different types of learning strategies:

- Serialists – Progress through a structure in a sequential fashion
- Holists – Look for higher order relations

The concept of an ideal learner emphasizes a balance between broad knowledge and specialized expertise, rather than focusing exclusively on either breadth or depth.

In learning, the stage where one converges or evolves, many Cyberneticians describe the act of understanding as a closed-loop. Instead of simply “taking in” new information, one goes back to look at their understandings and pulls together information that was “triggered” and forms a new connection. This connection becomes tighter and one's understanding of a certain concept is solidified or “stable” (Pangaro, 2003). Furthermore, Gordon Pask emphasized that conflict is the basis for the notion of “calling for'' additional information (Pangaro, 1992).

According to Entwistle, experiments which lead to the investigation of phenomenon later denoted by the term learning strategy came about through the implementation of a variety of learning tasks. Initially, this was done through utilising either CASTE, INTUITION, or the Clobbits pseudo-taxonomy. However, given issues resulting from either the time-consuming nature or operating experiments or inexactness of experimental conditions, new tests were created in the form of the Spy Ring History test and the Smuggler's test. The former test involved a participant having to learn the history of a fictitious spy ring (in other words, the history of a fictitious espionage network); the participant, having to learn about the history of five spies in three countries over the period of five years. The comprehension learning component of the test involved learning the similarities and differences between a set of networks; whereas the operation learning aspect of the test involved learning the role each spy played and what sequence of actions that spy played over a given year.

While Entwistle noted difficulties regarding the length of such tests for groups of students who were engaged in the Spy Ring History test, the results of the test did seem to correspond with the type of learning strategies discussed. However, it has been noted that while Pask and associates work on learning styles has been influential in both the development of conceptual tools and methodology, the Spy Ring History test and Smuggler's test may have been biased towards STEM students than humanities in its implementation, with Entwistle arguing that the "rote learning of formulae and definitions, together with a positive reaction to solving puzzles and problems of a logical nature, are characteristics more commonly found in science than arts student".

== Applications ==
One potential application of conversation theory that has been studied and developed is as an alternative approach to common types of search engine Information retrieval algorithms. Unlike PageRank-like algorithms, which determine the priority of a search result based on how many hyperlinks on the web link to them, conversation theory has been used to apply a discursive approach to web search requests.

ThoughtShuffler is an attempt to build a search engine utilizing design principles from conversation theory: In this approach, terms that are input into a search request yield search results relating to other terms that derive or help provide context to the meaning of the first in a way that mimics derivations of topics in an entailment structure. For example, given the input of a search term, a neighbourhood of corresponding terms that comprise the meaning of the first term may be suggested for the user to explore. In doing this, the search engine interface highlights snippets of webpages corresponding to a neighbourhood terms that help provide meaning to the first.

The aim of this design, is to provide just enough information for a user to become curious about a topic in order to induce the intention to explore other subtopics related to the main term input into the search engine.

== See also ==
- Conversational constraints theory
- Analogy § Cybernetics
- Gordon Pask § Interactions of Actors Theory
- Integrative learning
- Text and conversation theory

== Footnotes ==
1. For Gordon Pask's main works of conversation theory, see Pask (1975a), Pask (1975b), and Pask (1976) respectively.
2. Pask (1976) also notes other contributors including: Brian Lewis, Robin Bailey, David Ensor, Tony Newton, Valary Robinson, Robert Newton, Elizibeth Pask, V. Midora and N. Green.
3. Tilak et al. (2024) for example, provides design considerations for both search engines and educational technology with conversation theory as a theoretical base. Meanwhile, Battle (2023) suggests we may use conversation theory as a framework for designing computational agents, using Large Language Models, to emulate and build shared knowledge representations via dialogue.
4. In order to achieve this, Pask incorporated a variety of psychological, pedagogical and philosophical influences, such as Lev Vygotsky, R. D. Laing and George H. Mead and others.For further information see Laurillard (2002, p. 87), Tilak & Glassman (2022) and Scott (2021).
5. According to Dubberly & Pangaro (2009), conversation is distinguished from the mere exchange of information as seen in information theory, by the fact that utterances are interpreted within the context of a given perspective of such a learning system. It is postulated that if one conversational participant is to be aware of another participant's conception of a topic, then both participants must be able to converse with each other about that topic in such a way that it can be demonstrated that there is a common understanding as to the significance said topic.
6. Manning (2023a, pp. 49–50) notes this notion of a concept has been noted as formally resembling a TOTE cycle discussed by Miller, Galanter and Pribram. Following from this point, Tilak (2023) further argues that Pask believed Miller's model had been "carelessly applied to analogize the mind and computer programs without considering [the] possibility of recursive circularity between problem-solvers of varied competence iteratively supplementing each other's understandings" (p. 31).
7. This implies that when $R_{i}, R_{j} \in R$, that:
  $\begin{array}{c} R_{i} \vdash R_{j} \\ R_{j} \vdash R_{i} \end{array}$
  Whereby the respective indexical subscripts are used to represent some order of number upon a finite index of numbers.
8. See for example, the unfinished interaction of actors theory manuscript of Pask & De Zeeuw (1992).
