= Eucrates =

Eucrates was a hybrid teaching and learning analog computer created by Gordon Pask in 1956, in response to a request by the Solartron Electronic Group for a machine to exhibit at the Physical Society Exhibition in London.

Its operation was based on simulating the functioning of neurons.

The Solartron EUCRATES II was created by C.E.G. Bailey, T. Robin McKinnon Wood and Gordon Pask.
