= Interactions of actors theory =

In information theory, Interactions of actors theory is a theory developed by Gordon Pask and Gerard de Zeeuw. It is a generalisation of Pask's earlier conversation theory: The chief distinction being that conversation theory focuses on analysing the specific features that allow a conversation to emerge between two participants, whereas interaction of actor's theory focuses on the broader domain of conversation in which conversations may appear, disappear, and reappear over time.

== Overview ==
Interactions of actors theory was developed late in Pask's career. It is reminiscent of Freud's psychodynamics, Bateson's panpsychism (see "Mind and Nature: A Necessary Unity" 1980). Pask's nexus of analogy, dependence and mechanical spin produces the differences that are central to cybernetics.

While working with clients in the last years of his life, Pask produced an axiomatic scheme for his interactions of actors theory, less well-known than his conversation theory. Interactions of Actors, Theory and Some Applications, as the manuscript is entitled, is essentially a concurrent spin calculus applied to the living environment with strict topological constraints. One of the most notable associates of Gordon Pask, Gerard de Zeeuw, was a key contributor to the development of interactions of actors theory.

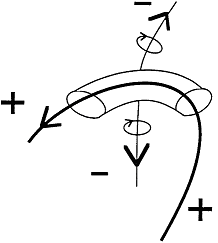
The figure shows Pask's "repulsive carapace" force surrounding a concept. It is shown by the minus sign, it has a clockwise or anticlockwise spin – compare Spin. The spin signature is determined by the residual parity of a braid which is the thick line enclosed by the cylinder. The plus sign labels a process seeking closure by "eating its own tail". Three of these toroidal structures can produce a Borromean link model of the minimal stable concept. Pask said the prismatic tensegrity could be used as a model for the interaction in a Borromean link.

Prismatic tensegrity space filling unit cell of a minimal concept. The red, blue and green rods exert compressive repulsions, the black lines represent attractive tensions. The Borromean link shown is regarded as a resonance form (cf. tautomerism) of Pask's minimal persisting concept triple.

Interactions of actors theory is a process theory. As a means to describe the interdisciplinary nature of his work, Pask would make analogies to physical theories in the classic positivist enterprises of the social sciences. Pask sought to apply the axiomatic properties of agreement or epistemological dependence to produce a "sharp-valued" social science with precision comparable to the results of the hard sciences. It was out of this inclination that he would develop his interactions of actors theory. Pask's concepts produce relations in all media and he regarded IA as a process theory. In his complementarity principle he stated "Processes produce products and all products (finite, bounded coherences) are produced by processes".

Most importantly Pask also had his exclusion principle. He proved that no two concepts or products could be the same because of their different histories. He called this the "No Doppelgangers" clause or edict. Later he reflected "Time is incommensurable for Actors". He saw these properties as necessary to produce differentiation and innovation or new coherences in physical nature and, indeed, minds.

In 1995, Pask stated what he called his Last Theorem: "Like concepts repel and unlike concepts attract". For ease of application Pask stated the differences and similarities of descriptions (the products of processes) were context and perspective dependent. In the last three years of his life Pask presented models based on Knot theory knots which described minimal persisting concepts. He interpreted these as acting as computing elements which exert repulsive forces to interact and persist in filling the space. The knots, links and braids of his entailment mesh models of concepts, which could include tangle-like processes seeking "tail-eating" closure, Pask called "tapestries".

His analysis proceeded with like seeming concepts repelling or unfolding but after a sufficient duration of interaction (he called this duration "faith") a pair of similar or like-seeming concepts will always produce a difference and thus an attraction. Amity (availability for interaction), respectability (observability), responsibility (able to respond to stimulus), unity (not uniformity) were necessary properties to produce agreement (or dependence) and agreement-to-disagree (or relative independence) when Actors interact. Concepts could be applied imperatively or permissively when a Petri (see Petri net) condition for synchronous transfer of meaningful information occurred. Extending his physical analogy Pask associated the interactions of thought generation with radiation : "operations generating thoughts and penetrating conceptual boundaries within participants, excite the concepts bounded as oscillators, which, in ridding themselves of this surplus excitation, produce radiation"

In sum, IA supports the earlier kinematic conversation theory work where minimally two concurrent concepts were required to produce a non-trivial third. One distinction separated the similarity and difference of any pair in the minimum triple. However, his formal methods denied the competence of mathematics or digital serial and parallel processes to produce applicable descriptions because of their innate pathologies in locating the infinitesimals of dynamic equilibria (Stafford Beer's "Point of Calm"). He dismissed the digital computer as a kind of kinematic "magic lantern". He saw mechanical models as the future for the concurrent kinetic computers required to describe natural processes. He believed that this implied the need to extend quantum computing to emulate true field concurrency rather than the current von Neumann architecture.

Reviewing IA he said:

Interaction of actors has no specific beginning or end. It goes on forever. Since it does so it has very peculiar properties. Whereas a conversation is mapped (due to a possibility of obtaining a vague kinematic, perhaps picture-frame image, of it, onto Newtonian time, precisely because it has a beginning and end), an interaction, in general, cannot be treated in this manner. Kinematics are inadequate to deal with life: we need kinetics. Even so as in the minimal case of a strict conversation we cannot construct the truth value, metaphor or analogy of A and B. The A, B differences are generalizations about a coalescence of concepts on the part of A and B; their commonality and coherence is the similarity. The difference (reiterated) is the differentiation of A and B (their agreements to disagree, their incoherences). Truth value in this case meaning the coherence between all of the interacting actors.

He added:

It is essential to postulate vectorial times (where components of the vectors are incommensurate) and furthermore times which interact with each other in the manner of Louis Kaufmann's knots and tangles.

In experimental Epistemology Pask, the "philosopher mechanic", produced a tool kit to analyse the basis for knowledge and criticise the teaching and application of knowledge from all fields: the law, social and system sciences to mathematics, physics and biology. In establishing the vacuity of invariance Pask was challenged with the invariance of atomic number. "Ah", he said "the atomic hypothesis". He rejected this instead preferring the infinite nature of the productions of waves.

Pask held that concurrence is a necessary condition for modelling brain functions and he remarked IA was meant to stand AI, Artificial Intelligence, on its head. Pask believed it was the job of cybernetics to compare and contrast. His IA theory showed how to do this. Heinz von Foerster called him a genius, "Mr. Cybernetics", the "cybernetician's cybernetician".

=== Hewitt's actor model ===
The Hewitt, Bishop and Steiger approach concerns sequential processing and inter-process communication in digital, serial, kinematic computers. It is a parallel or pseudo-concurrent theory as is the theory of concurrency. See Concurrency. In Pask's true field concurrent theory kinetic processes can interrupt (or, indeed, interact with) each other, simply reproducing or producing a new resultant force within a coherence (of concepts) but without buffering delays or priority.

== No Doppelgangers ==
"There are no Doppelgangers" is a fundamental theorem, edict or clause of cybernetics due to Pask in support of his theories of learning and interaction in all media: conversation theory and interactions of actors theory. It accounts for physical differentiation and is Pask's exclusion principle. It states no two products of concurrent interaction can be the same because of their different dynamic contexts and perspectives. No Doppelgangers is necessary to account for the production by interaction and intermodulation (cf. beats) of different, evolving, persisting and coherent forms. Two proofs are presented both due to Pask.

=== Duration proof ===
Consider a pair of moving, dynamic participants $\textstyle A$ and $\textstyle B$ producing an interaction $\textstyle T$. Their separation will vary during $\textstyle T$. The duration of $\textstyle T$ observed from $\textstyle A$ will be different from the duration of $\textstyle T$ observed from $\textstyle B$.

Let $\textstyle T$^{$\textstyle s$} and $\textstyle T$^{$\textstyle f$} be the start and finish times for the transfer of meaningful information, we can write:

T^{s}A ≠ T^{f}B,

T^{s}B ≠ T^{f}B,

T^{s}A ≠ T^{s}B,

T^{f}A ≠ T^{s}B

T^{f}A ≠ T^{s}A

T^{f}A ≠ T^{f}B

Thus

A ≠ B

Q.E.D.

Pask remarked:

Conversation is defined as having a beginning and an end and time is vectorial. The components of the vector are commensurable (in duration). On the other hand actor interaction time is vectorial with components that are incommensurable. In the general case there is no well-defined beginning and interaction goes on indefinitely. As a result the time vector has incommensurable components. Both the quantity and quality differ.

No Doppelgangers applies in both the conversation theory's kinematic domain (bounded by beginnings and ends) where times are commensurable and in the eternal kinetic interactions of actors domain where times are incommensurable.

=== Reproduction proof ===
The second proof is more reminiscent of R.D. Laing: Your concept of your concept is not my concept of your concept—a reproduced concept is not the same as the original concept. Pask defined concepts as persisting, countably infinite, recursively packed spin processes (like many cored cable, or skins of an onion) in any medium (stars, liquids, gases, solids, machines and, of course, brains) that produce relations.

Here we prove A(T) ≠ B(T).

D means "description of" and <Con A(T), D A(T)> reads A's concept of T produces A's description of T, evoking Dirac notation (required for the production of the quanta of thought: the transfer of "set-theoretic tokens", as Pask puts it in 1996).

TA = A(T) = <Con A(T), D A(T)>, A's Concept of T,

TB = B(T) = <Con B(T), D B(T)>, B's Concept of T,

or, in general

TZ = Z(T) = <Con Z (T), D Z(T)>,

also, in general

AA = A(A) = <Con A(A), D A(A)>, A's Concept of A,

AB = A(B) = <Con A(B), D A(B)>, A's Concept of B.

and vice versa, or, in general terms

ZZ = Z(Z) = <Con Z(Z), D Z>,

given that for all Z and all T, the concepts

TA = A(T) is not equal to TB = B(T)

and that

AA = A(A) is not equal to BA = B(A) and vice versa, hence, there are no Doppelgangers.

Q.E.D.

=== A mechanical model ===
Pask attached a piece of string to a bar with three knots in it. Then he attached a piece of elastic to the bar with three knots in it. One observing actor, A, on the string would see the knotted intervals on the other actor as varying as the elastic was stretched and relaxed corresponding to the relative motion of B as seen from A. The knots correspond to the beginning of the experiment then the start and finish of the A/B interaction. Referring to the three intervals, where x, y, z, are the separation distances of the knots from the bar and each other, he noted x > y > z on the string for participant A does not imply x > z for participant B on the elastic. A change of separation between A and B producing Doppler shifts during interaction, recoil or the differences in relativistic proper time for A and B, would account for this for example. On occasion a second knotted string was tied to the bar representing coordinate time.

=== Further context ===
To set in further context Pask won a prize from Old Dominion University for his complementarity principle: "All processes produce products and all products are produced by processes". This can be written:

Ap(Con_{Z}(T)) => D_{Z} (T) where => means produces and Ap means the "application of", D means "description of" and Z is the concept mesh or coherence of which T is part. This can also be written

<Ap(Con_{Z} (T)), D_{Z} (T)>.

Pask distinguishes Imperative (written &Ap or IM) from Permissive Application (written Ap) where information is transferred in the Petri net manner, the token appearing as a hole in a torus producing a Klein bottle containing recursively packed concepts.

Pask's "hard" or "repulsive" carapace was a condition he required for the persistence of concepts. He endorsed Nicholas Rescher's coherence theory of truth approach where a set membership criterion of similarity also permitted differences amongst set or coherence members, but he insisted repulsive force was exerted at set and members' coherence boundaries. He said of G. Spencer Brown's Laws of Form that distinctions must exert repulsive forces. This is not yet accepted by Spencer Brown and others. Without a repulsion, or Newtonian reaction at the boundary, sets, their members or interacting participants would diffuse away forming a "smudge"; Hilbertian marks on paper would not be preserved. Pask, the mechanical philosopher, wanted to apply these ideas to bring a new kind of rigour to cybernetic models.

Some followers of Pask emphasise his late work, done in the closing chapter of his life, which is neither as clear nor as grounded as the prior decades of research and machine- and theory-building. This tends to skew the impression gleaned by researchers as to Pask's contribution or even his lucidity.
