= Second-order cybernetics =

Application of cybernetics to itself

Second-order cybernetics, also known as the cybernetics of cybernetics, is the recursive application of cybernetics to itself and the reflexive practice of cybernetics according to such a critique. It is cybernetics where "the role of the observer is appreciated and acknowledged rather than disguised, as had become traditional in western science". Second-order cybernetics was developed between the late 1960s and mid 1970s (Note: Glanville gives the dates of 1968–1975. Mead's address to the ASC was given in 1967 and published in 1968, while Pask's Conversation Theory was published in 1976.) by Heinz von Foerster and others, with key inspiration coming from Margaret Mead. Foerster referred to it as "the control of control and the communication of communication" and differentiated first-order cybernetics as "the cybernetics of observed systems" and second-order cybernetics as "the cybernetics of observing systems".

The concept of second-order cybernetics is closely allied to radical constructivism, which was developed around the same time by Ernst von Glasersfeld. While it is sometimes considered a break from the earlier concerns of cybernetics, there is much continuity with previous work and it can be thought of as a distinct tradition within cybernetics, with origins in issues evident during the Macy conferences in which cybernetics was initially developed. Its concerns include autonomy, epistemology, ethics, language, reflexivity, self-consistency, self-referentiality, and self-organizing capabilities of complex systems, such as in complexity theory (extenuating to the field of complexity economics). It has been characterised as cybernetics where "circularity is taken seriously".

== Overview ==
=== Terminology ===
Second-order cybernetics can be abbreviated as C2, C^{2}, or SOC, and is sometimes referred to as the cybernetics of cybernetics, or, more rarely, the new cybernetics, or second cybernetics.

These terms are often used interchangeably, but can also stress different aspects:

- Most specifically, and especially where phrased as the cybernetics of cybernetics, second-order cybernetics is the recursive application of cybernetics to itself. This is closely associated with Mead's 1967 address to the American Society for Cybernetics (published 1968) and Foerster's "Cybernetics of Cybernetics" book, developed as a course option at the Biological Computer Laboratory (BCL), where cybernetic texts were analysed according to the principles they put forward. In this sense, second-order cybernetics can be considered the "conscience" of cybernetics, attending to the subject's consistency and clarity.
- More generally, second-order cybernetics is the reflexive practice of cybernetics, where cyberneticians understand themselves and other participants to be part of the systems they study and act in, taking a second-order position whether or not it is termed as such. When cybernetics is practiced in this way, second-order cybernetics and cybernetics may be used interchangeably, with the qualifier 'second-order' being used when drawing distinctions from (or critiquing) other approaches (e.g. differentiating from purely technological applications) or as a way of emphasising reflexivity.
- Additionally, and especially where referred to as the new cybernetics, second-order cybernetics may refer to substantial developments in direction and scope taken by cybernetics from the 1970s onward, with greater focus on social and philosophical concerns.

=== Initial development ===
Second-order cybernetics took shape during the late 1960s and mid 1970s. The 1967 keynote address to the inaugural meeting of the American Society for Cybernetics (ASC) by Margaret Mead, who had been a participant at the Macy Conferences, is a defining moment in its development. Mead characterised "cybernetics as a way of looking at things and as a language for expressing what one sees", calling on cyberneticians to assume responsibility for the social consequences of the language of cybernetics and the development of cybernetic systems. Mead's paper concluded with a proposal directed at the ASC itself, drawing on an earlier suggestion to the Society for General Systems Research (now the International Society for the Systems Sciences], that it organise itself in the light of the ideas with which it was concerned. That is, the practice of cybernetics by the ASC should be subject to cybernetic critique, an idea returned to by Ranulph Glanville in his time as president of the society.

Mead's paper was published in 1968 in a collection edited by Heinz von Foerster. With Mead uncontactable due to field work at the time, Foerster titled the paper "Cybernetics of Cybernetics", a title that perhaps emphasised his concerns more than Mead's. Foerster promoted second-order cybernetics energetically, developing it as a means of renewal for cybernetics generally and as what has been called an "unfinished revolution" in science. Foerster developed second-order cybernetics as a critique of realism and objectivity and as a radically reflexive form of science, where observers enter their domains of observation, describing their own observing not the supposed causes.

The initial development of second-order cybernetics was consolidated by the mid 1970s in a series of significant developments and publications. These included: the 1974 publication of the "Cybernetics of Cybernetics" book, edited by Foerster, (Note: Note that Foerster has two publications with the title "Cybernetics of Cybernetics" - the 1974 book and a 1979 paper.) developed as a course option at the BCL examining various texts from cybernetics according to the principles they proposed; autopoiesis, developed by biologists Humberto Maturana and Francisco Varela; conversation theory, developed by Gordon Pask, Bernard Scott and Dionysius Kallikourdis; radical constructivism, developed by Ernst von Glasersfeld; and other explorations of self-reference, including Foerster's eigen-forms and Glanville's theory of objects.

=== Participant observers ===
A key concept in second-order cybernetics is that observers (and other actors, such as designers, modellers, users...) are to be understood as participants within the systems with which they are engaged, in contrast to the detachment implied in objectivity and conventional scientific practice. This includes cyberneticians inclusion of themselves in the practice of cybernetics, as well as the inclusion of participants within the consideration and design of systems more generally.

Second-order cybernetics' emphasis on participation and inclusion has led to affinities and overlaps with action research, design, and the creative arts.

While second-order cybernetics continues to use of the terms observing and observers following Foerster's formulation, Ranulph Glanville has suggested using the terms composition and composers instead to better indicate the active role of participation.

=== Ethical implications ===
The critique of objectivity developed in second-order cybernetics has led to a concern with ethical issues. Foerster developed a critique of morality in ethical terms, arguing for ethics to remain implicit in action. Foerster's position has been described as an "ethics of enabling ethics" or as a form of "recursive ethical questioning". Varela published a short book on "ethical know-how". Glanville identified a number of "desirable" ethical qualities implicit in the cybernetic devices of the black box, distinction, autonomy, and conversation. Others have drawn connections to design and critical systems heuristics.

=== Relationship to first-order cybernetics ===
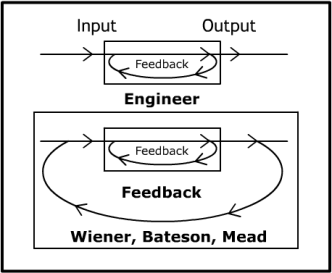
Diagram from Stewart Brand's 1976 conversation with Margaret Mead and Gregory Bateson, noting that they and Norbert Wiener understood themselves as participant observers in contrast to the detached "input-output" approach typical of engineering

The relationship of first-order and second-order cybernetics can be compared to that between Isaac Newton's view of the universe and that of Albert Einstein. Just as Newton's description remains appropriate and usable in many circumstances, even flights to the moon, so first-order cybernetics also provides everything that is needed in many circumstances. In the same way that the Newtonian view is understood to be a special, restricted version of Einstein's view, so first-order cybernetics may be understood as a special, restricted version of second-order cybernetics.

The distinction between first and second-order cybernetics is sometimes used as a form of periodisation, while can obscure the continuity between earlier and later cybernetics, (Note: The terms 'early cybernetics' and 'later cybernetics' have sometimes been used to avoid this confusion.) with what would come to be called second-order qualities evident in the work of cyberneticians such as Warren McCulloch and Gregory Bateson, and with Foerster and Mead being both Macy conference participants and instigators of second-order cybernetics. Mead and Bateson, for instance, noted that they and Wiener understood themselves as participant observers in contrast to the detached "input-output" approach typical of engineering. In this sense, second-order cybernetics can be thought of as a distinct tradition within cybernetics that developed along different lines to the narrower framing of engineering cybernetics.

Pask summarized the differences between the old and the new cybernetics as a shift in emphasis: from information to coupling, from the reproduction of "order-from-order" (Schroedinger 1944) to the generation of "order-from-noise" (von Foerster 1960), from transmission of data to conversation, and from external observation to participant observation.

=== Third and higher orders ===
Some see the definition of third and higher orders of cybernetics as a next step in the development of the discipline, but this has not won widespread acceptance. Attempts to define a third order of cybernetics have been concerned with embedding the participant observer of second-order cybernetics explicitly within broader social and/or ecological contexts.

Foerster discouraged the definition of higher orders, regarding the distinction between first-and second as an either/or regarding the position of the cyberneticians with regard to their system of concern.

== Heinz von Foerster and the Biological Computer Laboratory ==
Second-order cybernetics is closely identified with Heinz von Foerster and the work of the Biological Computer Laboratory (BCL) at the University of Illinois Urbana–Champaign.

Foerster attributes the origin of second-order cybernetics to the attempts by cyberneticians to construct a model of the mind:

... a brain is required to write a theory of a brain. From this follows that a theory of the brain, that has any aspirations for completeness, has to account for the writing of this theory. And even more fascinating, the writer of this theory has to account for her or himself. Translated into the domain of cybernetics; the cybernetician, by entering his own domain, has to account for his or her own activity. Cybernetics then becomes cybernetics of cybernetics, or second-order cybernetics.

== Associated theories ==
Theoretical developments closely associated with the development of second-order cybernetics include:

=== Autopoiesis ===
Biologists such as Maturana, Varela, and Atlan "realized that the cybernetic metaphors of the program upon which molecular biology had been based rendered a conception of the autonomy of the living being impossible. Consequently, these thinkers were led to invent a new cybernetics, one more suited to the organization mankind discovers in nature."

=== Eigenform ===
The notion of eigenform is an example of a self-referential system that produces a stable form. It plays an important role in the work of Heinz von Foerster and is "inextricably linked with second order cybernetics".

=== Radical constructivism ===
Radical constructivism is an approach to epistemology developed initially by Ernst von Glasersfeld. It is closely associated with second-order cybernetics, especially with the work of Heinz von Foerster and Humberto Maturana.

== Practice and application ==
=== In the creative arts ===
Second-order cybernetics has been a point of reference in the creative arts, including in theatre studies and music theory.

Practitioners in the creative arts whose work is associated with second-order cybernetics include Roy Ascott, Herbert Brün, and Tom Scholte.

=== In design ===
Second-order cybernetics has contributed to design in areas including design computation, design methods, interactive architecture, systemic design, and the relationship between design and research.

Designers and design theorists influenced by cybernetics include Horst Rittel, Christopher Alexander, Cedric Price, Bruce Archer, Ranulph Glanville, Klaus Krippendorff, Paul Pangaro, Annetta Pedretti, Lebbeus Woods and Neil Spiller.

=== In enactivism and embodied cognitive science ===
Enactivism is a position in cognitive science that argues that cognition arises through a dynamic interaction between an acting organism and its environment.

=== In education ===
Contributions in education, include:

- Pask's work was carried out in the context of the development of theories of teaching and learning, and the development of educational technology.
- Radical constructivism has been applied in educational research and practice, where it challenges traditional assumptions about learning and teaching.

=== In family therapy ===
The ideas of second-order cybernetics have been influential in systemic and constructivist approaches to family therapy, with Bateson's work at the Mental Research Institute in Palo Alto being a key influence. Family therapists influenced by aspects of second-order cybernetics include Lynn Hoffman, Bradford Keeney and Paul Watzlawick.

=== In management and organisation ===
Organizational cybernetics is distinguished from management cybernetics. Both use many of the same terms but interpret them according to another philosophy of systems thinking. Organizational cybernetics by contrast offers a significant break with the assumption of the hard approach. The full flowering of organizational cybernetics is represented by Beer's viable system model.

Organizational cybernetics studies organizational design, and the regulation and self-regulation of organizations from a systems theory perspective that also takes the social dimension into consideration. Researchers in economics, public administration and political science focus on the changes in institutions, organisation and mechanisms of social steering at various levels (sub-national, national, European, international) and in different sectors (including the private, semi-private and public sectors; the latter sector is emphasised).

The connection between second-order cybernetics and management cybernetics can be found through organizational theory. As meaning processing systems, social systems are relational in nature, as their elements are made up of the communications that form the basis of these social relations. Organizations are a particular type of social systems that self-produce by communicating decisions. The self-production consists of communications that select selections which further reinforces and forms the basis of future communications.

Decisions as elements of organizations are communications that communicate a selection as a selection which allows for the furthering of organizational purpose as social systems that produce new communications out of existing and previous communications.

=== In mathematics and logic ===
Second-order cybernetics was influenced by George Spencer Brown's Laws of Form, which was later developed by Francisco Varela into a calculus for self-reference. Mathematicians and logicians working in second-order cybernetics include Gotthard Günther, Lars Löfgren, and Louis Kauffman.

=== In sociocybernetics ===
In political science in the 1980s unlike its predecessor, the new cybernetics concerns itself with the interaction of autonomous political actors and subgroups and the practical reflexive consciousness of the subject who produces and reproduces the structure of political community. A dominant consideration is that of recursiveness, or self-reference of political action both with regard to the expression of political consciousness and with the ways in which systems build upon themselves.

In 1978, Geyer and van der Zouwen discuss a number of characteristics of the emerging "new cybernetics". One characteristic of new cybernetics is that it views information as constructed by an individual interacting with the environment. This provides a new epistemological foundation of science, by viewing it as observer-dependent. Another characteristic of the new cybernetics is its contribution toward bridging the "micro-macro gap". That is, it links the individual with the society. Geyer and van der Zouten also noted that a transition from classical cybernetics to new cybernetics involves a transition from classical problems to new problems. These shifts in thinking involve, among other things, a change in emphasis on the system being steered to the system doing the steering, and the factors which guide the steering decisions. And a new emphasis on communication between several systems which are trying to steer each other.

Geyer & J. van der Zouwen (1992) recognize four themes in both sociocybernetics and new cybernetics:

1. An epistemological foundation for science as an observer-observer system. Feedback and feedforward loops are constructed not only between the observer, and the objects that are observed them and the observer.
2. The transition from classical, rather mechanistic first-order cybernetics to modern, second-order cybernetics, characterized by the differences summarized by Gordon Pask.
3. These problem shifts in cybernetics result from a thorough reconceptualization of many all too easily accepted and taken for granted concepts – which yield new notions of stability, temporality, independence, structure versus behaviour, and many other concepts.
4. The actor-oriented systems approach, promulgated in 1978 made it possible to bridge the "micro-macro" gap in social science thinking.

The reformulation of sociocybernetics as an "actor-oriented, observer-dependent, self-steering, time-variant" paradigm of human systems, was most clearly articulated by Geyer and van der Zouwen in 1978 and 1986. They stated that sociocybernetics is more than just social cybernetics, which could be defined as the application of the general systems approach to social science. Social cybernetics is indeed more than such a one-way knowledge transfer. It implies a feed-back loop from the area of application – the social sciences – to the theory being applied, namely cybernetics; consequently, sociocybernetics can indeed be viewed as part of the new cybernetics: as a result of its application to social science problems, cybernetics, itself, has been changed and has moved from its originally rather mechanistic point of departure to become more actor-oriented and observer-dependent.

In summary, the new sociocybernetics is much more subjective and uses a sociological approach more than classical cybernetics approach with its emphasis on control. The new approach has a distinct emphasis on steering decisions; furthermore, it can be seen as constituting a reconceptualization of many concepts which are often routinely accepted without challenge.

=== In others ===
Others associated with or influenced by second-order cybernetics include:

- Henri Atlan, biophysicist influenced by Foerster.
- Stewart Brand, associated with Bateson and Foerster. Some of the proceeds from Brand's Whole Earth Catalogue funded the publication of Foerster's Cybernetics of Cybernetics book.
- Nicholas Negroponte, for whose Architecture Machine Group Pask worked as a consultant.
- William Irwin Thompson.

Other areas of application include:

- Artificial neural networks
- Living systems
- New robotic approaches
- Reflexive understanding
- Political communication
- Social dimensions of cognitive science
- Sustainable development
- Symbolic artificial intelligence
- Systemic group therapy

== Organisations ==
- American Society for Cybernetics
- Department of Contemporary History of the University of Vienna holds the archives of several second-order cyberneticians including those of Ranulph Glanville, Heinz von Foerster, Gordon Pask, and Stuart Umpleby, as well as the archive of the American Society for Cybernetics.

== Journals ==
Journals with focuses on second-order cybernetics include:

- Constructivist Foundations
- Cybernetics and Human Knowing

== Limitations and criticism ==
Andrew Pickering has criticised second-order cybernetics as a form of linguistic turn that, while not being complete Sokalian nonsense, has nevertheless moved away from the technical practices he finds valuable in earlier cybernetics. He approvingly referenced the work of figures associated with second-order cybernetics, such as Bateson and Pask, and the idea of participant observers which fall within the scope of second-order cybernetics broadly considered.

== See also ==
- Autonomous agency theory – a viable system theory which models autonomous social complex adaptive systems
- Coherence therapy § Hierarchical organization of constructs
- Constructivism (philosophy of science) – view in the philosophy of science that maintains that scientific knowledge is constructed by the scientific community
- Constructivism (psychological school) – set of theories which emphasize the active constructive nature of human knowledge
- Double hermeneutic – a feature of social sciences, that they can influence the subject of their study
- Double-loop learning – the modification of goals or decision-making rules in the light of experience
- Meta (prefix) – Prefix in English derived from Greek
- System of systems – Collection of co-operating systems
- Systemics – Study of systems
- Systems science – Study of the nature of systems
- Viable system theory – Approach to systems analyis
