= Journal of Research Practice =

- Discipline: Research philosophy
- Language: English
- Edited by: Debiprasad Dash, Hector Ponce

Publication details
- History: 2005-2018
- Publisher: Athabasca University Press (Canada)
- Frequency: Biannually
- Open access: Yes

Standard abbreviations
- ISO 4: J. Res. Pract.

Indexing
- ISSN: 1712-851X
- OCLC no.: 449524705

Links
- Journal homepage; Online access; Online archive

The Journal of Research Practice was a biannual peer-reviewed open access academic journal covering the philosophy of research. It was published by Athabasca University Press. Free access was made possible through institutional sponsorships and optional processing fees paid by authors. The editors-in-chief were D. P. Dash (Swinburne University of Technology and Xavier Institute of Management) and Werner Ulrich (University of Fribourg and Open University). After the retirement of both editors submissions to the journal were no longer accepted, although past volumes are available at the journal link (below). The journal is abstracted and indexed in Scopus.
