= Media art history =

Interdisciplinary field of media

Media art history is an interdisciplinary field of research that explores the current developments as well as the history and genealogy of new media art, digital art, and electronic art. On the one hand, media art histories addresses the contemporary interplay of art, technology, and science. On the other, it aims to reveal the historical relationships and aspects of the ‘afterlife’ (Aby Warburg) in new media art by means of a historical comparative approach. This strand of research encompasses questions of the history of media and perception, of so-called archetypes, as well as those of iconography and the history of ideas. Moreover, one of the main agendas of media art histories is to point out the role of digital technologies for contemporary, post-industrial societies and to counteract the marginalization of according art practices and art objects: ″Digital technology has fundamentally changed the way art is made. Over the last forty years, media art has become a significant part of our networked information society. Although there are well-attended international festivals, collaborative research projects, exhibitions and database documentation resources, media art research is still marginal in universities, museums and archives. It remains largely under-resourced in our core cultural institutions.″

The term new media art itself is of great importance to the field. New media art is an umbrella term that encompasses art forms that are produced, modified and transmitted by means of digital technologies or, in a broader sense, make use of ‘new’ and emerging technologies that originate from a scientific, military or industrial context. The majority of authors that try to ‘delineate’ the aesthetic object of new media art emphasize aspects of interactivity, processuality, multimedia, and real time. The focus of new media art lies in the cultural, political, and social implications as well as the aesthetic possibilities – more or less its ‘media-specificity’ – of digital media. Consequently, scholars recognize the function of media technologies in New Media Art not only as a ‘carrier’ of meaning, but instead as a means that fundamentally shapes the very meaning of the artwork itself.

Furthermore, the field of new media art is increasingly influenced by new technologies that surmount a traditional understanding of (art) media. This becomes apparent in regards to technologies that originate from the field of biotechnology and life science and that are employed in artistic practices such as bio art, genetic art, and transgenic art. Consequently, the term new media art does not imply a steady ‘genre’ of art production. Instead, it is a field that emphasizes new technologies (in order to establish an explicit difference with traditional art media and genres). The list of genres that are commonly subsumed under the label of new media art illustrates its broad scope and includes, among others, virtual art. Software Art, Internet Art, Game Art, Glitch Art, Telematic Art, Bio Art / Genetic Art, Interactive Art, computer animation and graphics, and Hacktivism and Tactical Media. These latter two ‘genres’ in particular have a strong focus on the interplay of art and (political) activism.

== Resources and research projects ==
In the last few years, there was a significant increase of festivals and conferences dedicated to new media art, though the dominant festivals in the field continue to be the Ars Electronica, the Transmediale, the ISEA (Inter-Society for the Electronic Arts), and SIGGRAPH (Special Interest Group on Graphics and Interactive Techniques). To this day, museums and research facilities specializing in New Media Art are the exception. Nevertheless, ZKM (Zentrum für Kunst und Medientechnologie) or specific focuses in collections (including the Whitney Museum, the New York Museum of Modern Art, or the Walker Art Center) serve as important spaces for exchange. Beyond museums that reach a wider audience, there are more and more smaller museums and galleries that focus on new media art (such as the Berlin-based DAM – Digital Art Museum). Additionally, archives in which are exhibited artifacts situated at the intersection of the histories of media, art, and technology are important resources, including collections such as that of Werner Nekes or those cabinets of wonder and curiosity incorporated in art history museums.

Even given this increase in festivals, however, a variety of significant research initiatives have been discontinued. These include the Ludwig Boltzmann Institute for Media.Art.Research, the Daniel Langlois Foundation for Art, Science and Technology, and Media Art Net. This difficulty in establishing sustainable funding structures as well as support for access to shared data for the scientific research of new media art was made public and addressed by the Liverpool Declaration. Scholars and artists based at institutions all over the globe signed the declaration in a call to develop systematic strategies to fulfill the task that digital culture and its research demands in the 21st century.

== Focus of research ==
Several scholars in the field of media art history claim that there is still a considerable lack of knowledge regarding the origins of visual and audio-visual media. Consequently, it is the objective of media art histories to expand the historically informed knowledge of current media cultures with its developments and detours. To promote intellectual exchange between individual disciplines and academic stakeholders, the term MediaArtHistories and its conference series has been developed by Oliver Grau and Wendy Coones between 2003-05 at Humboldt University in Berlin and established since 2005; it takes place every two years under the title International Conference on the Histories of Media Art, Science and Technology and features rotating international organizers and venues across three continents. The various institutions hosting the event also bring with them changing themes, such as Re:fresh (Banff 2005), Re:place (Berlin 2007), Re:live (Melbourne 2009), Re:wire (Liverpool 2011), Re:new (Riga 2013), Re:create (Montreal 2015), Re:Trace (Vienna/Krems 2017), Re:Sound (Aalborg 2019), Re:source (Venice 2023), Re:generative (Bogotá/Manizales 2025)

Hence, scholars stress that the technological advances in current media cultures are best understood on the backdrop of an extensive media and art history. Contributions to this field are widespread and include, among others, researchers who have disciplinary focuses such as the history of science (Lorraine Daston, Timothy Lenoir), art history and image science (Oliver Grau, Barbara Stafford, Dieter Daniels, Slavko Kacunko, Edward A. Shanken, Gunalan Nadarajan, Linda Dalrymple Henderson, Andreas Broeckmann, Jonathan Crary, Horst Bredekamp, Peter Weibel, Hans Belting), media studies and media archaeology (Friedrich Kittler, Erkki Huhtamo, Jussi Parikka, Wolfgang Ernst, Siegfried Zielinski, Stephan Oettermann, Lev Manovich), sound studies (Douglas Kahn), film studies (Sean Cubitt, Ryszard Kluszczyński), as well as computer science (Frieder Nake).
