= Ranulph Glanville =

Ranulph Glanville (13 June 1946 – 20 December 2014) was an Anglo-Irish cybernetician and design theorist. He was a founding vice-president of the International Academy for Systems and Cybernetic Sciences (2006–2009) and president of the American Society for Cybernetics (2009–2014).

== Education ==
Glanville studied architecture at the Architectural Association School in London, 1964–67 and 1969–71. He then went on to study for a doctorate in cybernetics with Gordon Pask at Brunel University (1975). He took another PhD, also at Brunel, in relationships between architecture and language, in the Centre for the Study of Human Learning (1988). Brunel awarded him a higher doctorate (DSc) in cybernetics and design in 2006.

== Work ==
Glanville was a lecturer at the School of Architecture, Portsmouth University from 1978 to 1996. He then became an itinerant academic with several temporary, adjunct or honorary appointments, including a professor of research design in the Faculty of Architecture, Catholic University of Leuven, Belgium, adjunct professor of design research at Royal Melbourne Institute of Technology, Australia, and professor of research in Innovation Design Engineering at the Royal College of Art, London (2008–14).

=== Cybernetics ===
Glanville’s main area of interest was second-order cybernetics (‘the cybernetics of cybernetics’), which developed from his work with Pask on a theory of objects for his PhD Thesis.

In his time as president of the American Society for Cybernetics, Glanville addressed the challenge Margaret Mead set the Society at its inaugural conference in 1967, that of applying cybernetic ideas to the formation of the society itself. While the main legacy of Mead's remarks has been the development of the epistemological concerns of second-order cybernetics by von Foerster and others, Glanville addressed them more directly in the innovative conversational (cybernetic) formats of the society's conferences, interpreting second order cybernetics in terms of how cybernetics may be practised cybernetically.

=== Design ===
In parallel with his work in cybernetics, Glanville developed a variety of views of design in relationship to cybernetics, and to science more generally. He suggested a close analogy existing between cybernetics and design, seeing them both as constructivist activities, and akin to two sides of the same coin, with “cybernetics as the theory of design and design as the action of cybernetics”. Similarly, he suggested scientific research to be a form of design, and therefore design research to be construed as an act of design rather than science.

== Selected publications ==
Glanville R. (ed.) (2007) Cybernetics and design. Special double issue of Kybernetes 36(9/10) https://www.emerald.com/insight/publication/issn/0368-492X/vol/36/iss/9/10

Glanville R. (2007) Try again. Fail again. Fail better: The cybernetics in design and the design in cybernetics. Kybernetes 36(9/10): 1173–1206

Glanville, R. (2004) The purpose of second-order cybernetics. Kybernetes 33(9/10): 1379–1386

Glanville R. (2002) Second order cybernetics. In: Parra-Luna F. (ed.) Systems science and cybernetics. Encyclopaedia of life support systems. EoLSS, Oxford (Web publication https://cepa.info/2708)

Glanville R. (1999) Researching design and designing research. Design Issues 15(2): 80–91

Glanville R. (1982) Inside every white box there are two black boxes trying to get out. Behavioral Science, 27(1): 1–11

A fully comprehensive list of publications is on Glanville's personal CV. Many papers and other writings were collected in The Black Boox.
