= Gordon Pask =

British psychologist and computer scientist (1928–1996)

- Born: 28 June 1928; Derby
- Died: 29 March 1996 (aged 67); London
- Education: University of Cambridge; University of London; Open University
- Known for: Conversation theory Chemical computing Cybernetic Serendipity; Fun Palaces; Interactions of actors theory
- Awards: Wiener Gold Medal (1984)
- Scientific career
- Fields: Applied epistemology Architecture; Chemical computing Cybernetics; Educational psychology Educational technology Human–computer interaction Systems art
- Workplaces: Brunel University; University of Illinois at Chicago; University of Illinois at Urbana-Champaign; Concordia University; Georgia Institute of Technology; Architectural Association
- Thesis: An Investigation of Learning under Normal and Adaptively Controlled Conditions (1964)
- Doctoral advisor: Aimable Robert Jonckheere
- Gordon Pask's voice Sample, sourced from an interview with Gordon Pask conducted by Bernard Scott

Andrew Gordon Speedie Pask (28 June 1928 – 29 March 1996) was a British cybernetician, inventor and polymath who made multiple contributions to cybernetics, educational psychology, educational technology, applied epistemology, chemical computing, architecture, and systems art. During his life, he gained three doctorate degrees. He was an avid writer, with more than two hundred and fifty publications which included a variety of journal articles, books, periodicals, patents, and technical reports (many of which can be found at the main Pask archive at the University of Vienna). (Note: Glanville (1993b) and Scott & Glanville (2007) contain a list of Pask's various publications and projects. For information on the Pask archives, see Müller (2007) for the University of Vienna archive and Pangaro (2007) for the North America archive.) He worked as an academic and researcher for a variety of educational settings, research institutes, and private stakeholders including but not limited to the University of Illinois, Concordia University, the Open University, Brunel University and the Architectural Association School of Architecture.

He is known for the development of conversation theory, which is a pedagogical, cybernetic and dialectical account for how two conversational participants who attempt to converse with each other in such a way to achieve a shared understanding amongst themselves as to the significance of a given topic. (Note: For Gordon Pask's main works of conversation theory, see Pask (1975a), Pask (1975b), and Pask (1976a) respectively.)

== Biography ==
=== Early life and education: 1928–1958 ===
Pask was born in Derby, England, on 28 June 1928, to his parents Percy and Mary Pask. His father was a partner in Pask, Cornish and Smart, a wholesale fruit business in Covent Garden. He had two older siblings: Alfred, who trained as an engineer before becoming a Methodist minister, and Edgar, a professor of anesthetics. (Note: Pickering (2009) notes that his brother Edgar was described by Pask as his hero and role model. Edgar was noted to have fought in World War II, and "carried out a series of life threatening experiments on himself aimed at increasing the survival rate of piolets" (p. 310). Edgar was thrown into pools unconscious to examine the properties of life jackets, thrown into the icy waters of Shetland, and so on. Pickering notes that this presented a hard act to follow for Pask, but "he did, in his own unusual way" (p. 311).) His family moved to the Isle of Wight shortly after his birth. He was educated at Rydal Penrhos. According to Andrew Pickering and G. M. Furtado Cardoso Lopes, school taught Pask to "be a gangster" and he was noted for having designed bombs during his time at Rydal Penrhos which was delivered to a government ministry in relation to the war effort during the Second World War. He later went on to complete two diplomas in Geology and Mining Engineering from Liverpool Polytechnic and Bangor University respectively.

Pask later attended Cambridge University around 1949 to study for a bachelor's degree, (Note: McKinnon-Wood (1993) claims Pask to have been studying Psychology at the time; whereas Scott (2007) claims Pask to have been studying Physiology.) where he met his future associate and business partner Robin McKinnon-Wood, who was studying his undergraduate in Maths and Physics at the time. At the time, Pask was living in Jordan's Yard, Cambridge under the supervision of the scientist and engineer John Brickell. During this time, Pask was more known for his work in the arts and musical theatre rather than his later pursuits in science and education. He became interested in cybernetics and information theory in the early 1950s when Norbert Wiener was asked to give a presentation on the subject for the university. (Note: Furtado Cardoso Lopes (2009, p. 27) notes that Pask's entrance into cybernetics dates to around this time. He had begun to accumulate early additions of the works of Wiener and Shannon.)

He eventually obtained an MA in natural sciences from the university in 1952, and met his future wife Elizabeth Pask (née Poole) around this time at the birthday party of a mutual friend when she was studying at Liverpool University and he was visiting his father in Wallasey, Merseyside. They married in 1956 and later had two daughters together.

=== Beginning of System Research Ltd: 1953–1961 ===
In 1953, along with his wife Elizabeth and Robin McKinnon-Wood, Pask formally founded the organization System Research Ltd., in Richmond, Surrey. According to McKinnon-Wood, his and Pask's early forays in musical comedy production at Cambridge through their earlier company Sirelelle laid the groundwork for his later company which they viewed as being "wholly consistent with the development of self-adaptive systems, self-organizing systems, man-machine interactions[,] etc". (Note: Pickering (2009) notes that Pask had fallen in love with the world of the arts through a school friend who ran a traveling cinema company in Wales (p. 313).) After rebranding the company as System Research Ltd., the company became non-profit in 1961 with significant funding coming from the United States Army and Airforce.

Throughout the company's existence, it conducted a variety of research and development initiatives on behalf of civil service organizations and research councils in both the United States and the United Kingdom. During the active period of System Research Ltd., he and his associates worked on a number of projects including SAKI (self-adaptive keyboard machine), MusiColour (a light show where the colored lights would reduce their responsiveness to a given keyboard input over time so as to induce the keyboard player to play a different range of notes), and finally educational technologies such as CASTE (Couse Assembly System Tutorial Environment) and Thoughtsticker (both of which were developed in the context of what became conversation theory).

During this period, Pask and McKinnon-Wood were asked to demonstrate their proof of concept for MusiColour on behalf of Billy Butlin. While the machine initially worked when the duo sought to demonstrate the technology to Butlin's deputy, after his arrival "it exploded in a cloud of white smoke", due to McKinnon-Wood "buying junk electronic capacitors". The duo managed to restart the machine; after which McKinnon-Wood purports Butlin to have remarked if such a machine could withstand an explosion like that, it must be reliable.

Stafford Beer also claims to have met Pask sometime during this period at a dinner party in Sheffield, (Note: Beer (1993) claims this would have been 40 years prior to the publication of his article, implying the date of their meeting would have been 1953 (p. 13). However, no exact confirmation of their first meeting is given to Beer. He also notes his "abysmal memory" (p. 14), such that the correctness of specific details in Beer's account cannot be confirmed.) and notes of both his genius, the difficulty in following his thought, and getting hold of; remarking both that "[Pask's] conception of things is not anyone else's perception of things", and that "The man can be quite infuriating". Between the early to mid-1950s, Pask began to develop electrochemical devices designed to find their own "relevance criteria". Pask performed experiments utilizing "electrochemical assemblages, passing current through various aqueous solutions of metallic salts (e.g., ferrous sulfate) in order to construct an analog control system". During the late 1950s, Pask managed to get a prototype device working. Oliver Selfridge noted that it was the second such mechanism, whereby "a machine build a machine electronically without any physical motion", actually worked.

In September 1958 in Namur, Belgium, he attended the second International Congress of Cybernetics. Pask was first introduced to Heinz von Foerster during this time, who were both informed by the attendees of the conference of having submitted similar papers. After searching for Pask through the streets of Namur, von Foerster described his first observation of Pask as that of a "leprechaun in a black double-breasted jacket over a white shirt with a black bow tie, puffing a cigarette through a long cigarette holder, and fielding questions, always with a polite smile, that were tossed at him from all directions". von Foerster later asked Pask to join him at the Biological Computer Laboratory at the University of Illinois; subsequently describing him after his death as both being difficult and yet a genius. He also this year produced SAKI (self-adaptive keyboard machine) for the instruction and development of keyboard skills aimed at the commercial marketplace.

His former research assistant Bernard Scott argues that "The Mechanisation of Thought Processes" conference at the National Physics Laboratory in Teddington, (Note: Cariani (1993) argues that the "Mechanization of Thought Processes" conference was likely the last large interdisciplinary meeting on general problems relating to artificial intelligence during the 20th century (p. 22). It contained people from direct programming (McCarthy, Minsky, Backus, Hopper, Bar-Hillel), neural nets (Selfridge, Uttley), cybernetics (Ashby, Pask), and neurophysiology (Barlow, McCulloch, Whitfield).) London represented a critical point in the development of Pask's thinking: (Note: Scott (2007) states the event occurred in 1959 (p. 33), while Cariani (1993) states the event took place in November 1958 (p. 22).) It was here Pask first published his paper "Physical Analogues to the Growth of a Concept" (1959) which contained a theoretical discussion on how the "growth of crystals [through the use of] electrodes suspended in an electronic solution", could be used to represent in purely physical phenomenon the growth of a concept. Warren McCulloch wrote in relation to the presentation that: "[Pask's] gadget does work; it does "take habits" by a mechanism that Charles Peirce proposed". (Note: McCulloch (2016) expresses issue with the view that the organic evolution occurs through a brute force trial-and-error style process. He suggests other parameters must be at play which leads to the emergence of viable organisms: “I believe they are sought in the nature of her building blocks, [subatomic] particles, atoms, and molecules, proceeding discretely through well-regulated autocatalytic reactions to produce cells and cell aggregates, or, as in Pask's example, crystals" (p. 251).) During the later years of this period, Pask had begun to describe himself as a mechanic philosopher to emphasize both the theoretical and experimental aspects of his role. (Note: Scott (2007) is of the opinion that Pask's primary emphasis in his activity was not system building or inventing. Instead, he was a thinker or theoretician who wanted to embed his theory in tangible artefacts (p. 32).)

=== Later period of System Research Ltd: 1961–1978 ===
During the 1960s, Pask worked significantly with psychologist B. N. Lewis and computer scientist G. L. Mallen. (Note: Mallen later went on to help found the Computer Arts Society in 1968, alongside Alan Sutcliffe and John Lansdown.) In 1961, Pask published An Approach to Cybernetics. According to Ranulph Glanville, the work argued in favour of the notion that cybernetics was at its heart the art of creating defensible metaphors; this being in reference to the cross-disciplinary nature of the early cybernetics movement, which specifically stressed how analogous forms of control and communication could be found operating between disciplines.

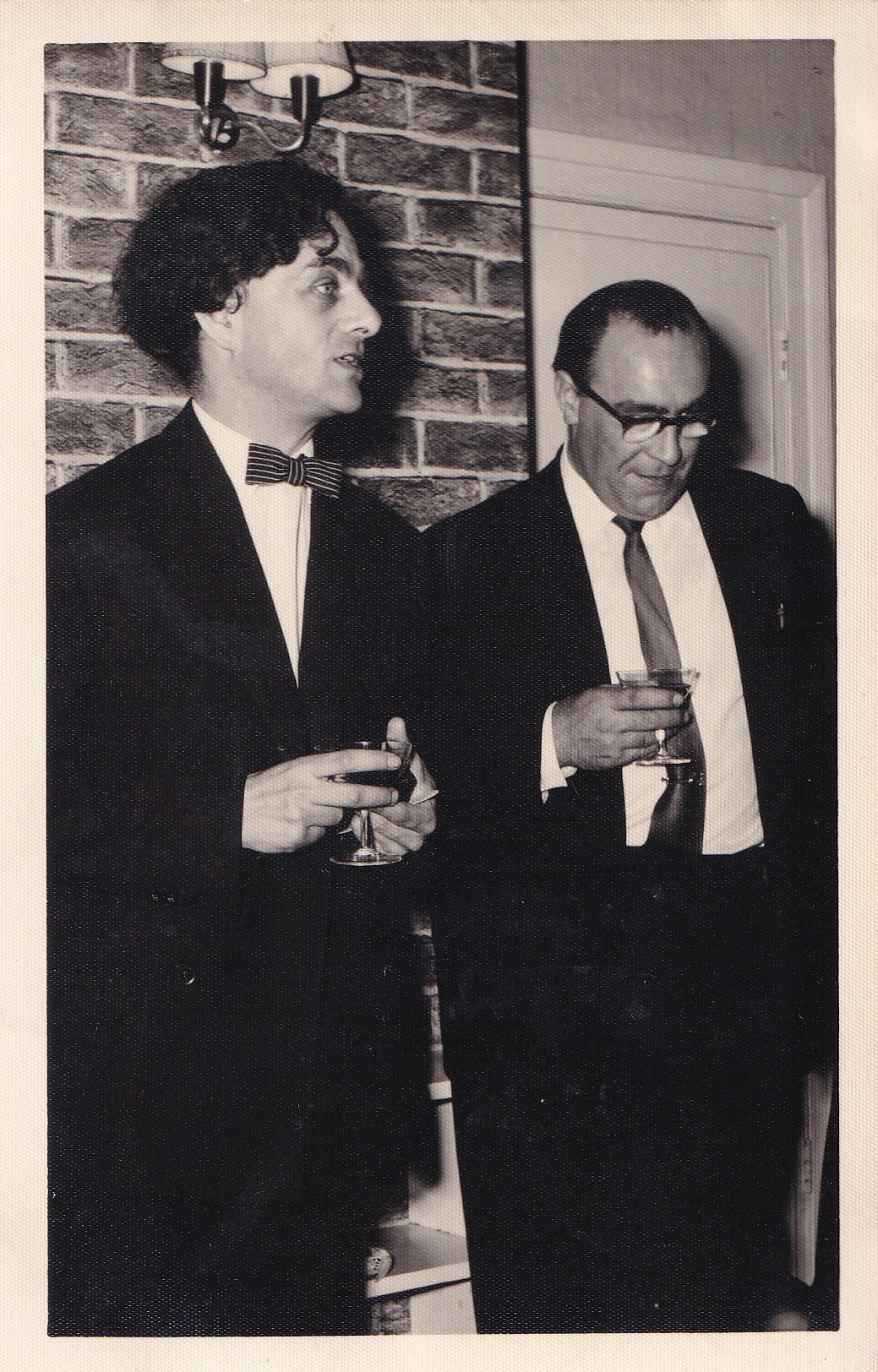
A picture taken on Gordon Pask in 1963 in his mid-thirties.

Mallen joined System Research Ltd., in 1964 as a research associate on a project to analyse decision-making in crime investigation. This led to the development of SIMPOL (SIMulation of a POLice system), which was an information management game. Results from the project were reported back to the home office and were believed by Mallen to have had some impact on policy decisions taken by the police. Mallen described Gordon as "a great gadgeteer and had built adaptive teaching machines, for example, to train teleprinter operators, and he used these as a way into understanding human skill learning processes". Mallen suggests that also during this year, Pask presented a lecture to Ealing College of Art on system theory and cybernetics. He writes this influenced several students there, and represented a general ethos in the 1960s regarding the breaking of disciplinary boundaries for which Systems Research Ltd., became a central convergence point. One notable project Pask became involved with involved the Fun Palace, conceived of with the aid of Joan Littlewood and Cedric Price.

Sometime during this period, Pask met George Spencer-Brown who became a lodger at the Pask family's home while working at Stafford Beer and Roger Eddison's operational research consultancy SIGMA (Science in General Management) via strong recommendation from Bertrand Russell. It was here where Spencer-Brown is said to have written his Laws of Form for long hours whilst inebriated in the Pask family's bathtub. According to Vanilla Beer, Stafford's daughter, Pask is purported to have claimed while reminiscing about Spencer-Brown's time at his and his wife's household, that "When [Spencer-Brown] bathed, it wasn't often. He used my gin, to wash in". His wife Elizabeth is also purported to have said, in reference to Spencer-Brown having forgot her name after he ceased to be a lodger, "I wouldn't mind, but I cooked for him for six months".

Pask later earned a PhD in psychology from the University of London in 1964, and later joined Brunel University in 1968 as one of the founding Professors of the Cybernetics Department at Brunel. The department was originally intended to be a research institute that was originally spearheaded by the media proprietor Cecil Harmsworth King, who was influenced by Stafford Beer's work in management consulting. King died however shortly before its opening, meaning that the Brunel enterprise mostly became a post-graduate teaching department rather than a research institute. Since Pask could not find a viable solution for intersecting his work at System Research Ltd., with the department's permission decided to become a part-time Professor there while Frank George became full-time head of the Cybernetics Department. It was here he recruited Bernard Scott who he was introduced to by David Stuart, a newly appointed lecturer at Brunel in the Department of Psychology. Scott later went on a sixth-month internship as a research assistant at System Research Ltd., who himself would later be a major contributor to the development of conversation theory.

Pask later discontinued his work on chemical computers. This may have happened during the early 1960s, or during the mid-1960s. According to Peter Cariani, funding for alternative approaches to artificial intelligence had dried up. This turn in direction was triggered by a greater emphasis on research utilizing symbolic artificial intelligence. Previous approaches to artificial intelligence, which included the use of neural nets, evolutionary programming, cybernetics, bionics, and bio-inspired computing, were side-lined by various funding bodies and interest groups. This placed greater pressure on System Research Ltd., to use more orthodox digital computer approaches to technology-based issues. Peter Cariani has expressed the view, that if we were to build physical devices a la Pask, we would replicate a kind of electrochemical assemblages, which would "have properties radically different from contemporary neural networks".

Mallen documents that in 1968, Pask arrived to "create an exhibit for Jasia Reichardt's planned Cybernetic Serendipity project at the Institute of Contemporary Arts". It was here where Pask's Colloquy of Mobiles was first exhibited. The figures in the exhibit would dance and rotate when spectators entered their vicinity. The system was built by Mark Dowson and Tony Watts, based on Pask's initial conception and with Mallen helping to install it. According to Mallen, " It proved popular when it worked, but was a mite unreliable".

In 1970, Mallen and others designed Ecogame, a system dynamics model of a hypothetical national economy, which encouraged participants to reflect on their own behavior in the system. The pedagogical function was influenced by Pask's research and activity in cybernetics and media-art. According to Claudia Costa Pederson, Pask understood and put emphasis on the view that learning was a self-organized, mutual and participatory process. Ecogame was therefore a pedagogical simulation, that was supposed to engage the viewer with an intuitive interface. It was successfully demonstrated in September 1970 at the Computer '70 trade show at the Olympia conference centre in London. Ecogame was subsequently incorporated into the program of the First European Management Forum during February 1971, which later emerged as the forerunner to the World Economic Forum in Davos. A version of Ecogame was sold to IBM for management education in the Blaricum IBM center. The slide projection technology of Ecogame was incorporated by Stafford Beer into Project Cybersyn, implemented by Salvador Allende in Chile.

During the early 1970s, Pask became heavily involved in joint initiatives between his company and the Centre for the Study of Human Learning (CSHL) alongside Laurie Thomas and Shelia Harri-Augstein at Brunel on behalf of the Ministry of Defence to examine conversational approaches to anger, where he exhibited alongside his associates at his company his CASTE and BOSS technologies. By 1972, Pask began the process of compiling his work into the form of "a formal theory of conversational processes". Due to the academic environment, Pask was working in, he decided early on from 1972 to 1973 to report on the experimental contents of his research due to the emphasis on empirical studies and general distrust of grand theory. Whilst visiting professor of educational technology, he obtained a DSc in cybernetics from the Open University in 1974.

The collective work on Pask's interest in conversation at this time culminated in three major publications with the aid of Bernard Scott, Dionysius Kallikourdis, and others. At the same time Pask, with the assistance of the computer scientist Nick Green and others, had begun to work on military contracts on behalf of the United States Army and the United States Army Air Forces respectively. In 1975, Pask's team at System Research Ltd. had written and published The Cybernetics of Human Learning & Performance and Conversation, Cognition and Learning: A Cybernetic Theory and Methodology. In the subsequent year 1976, they published Conversation Theory: Applications in Education and Epistemology. It has been claimed that due to the prevailing orthodox attitudes of psychological research at the time, his work did not gain widespread acceptance in the area but found more success in educational research. Pask also sometime between 1975 and 1978, received funding from the Science and Engineering Research Council to develop the "Spy Ring" test in relation to his theory of learning styles.

=== Dissolution of company and death: 1978–1996 ===
Around 1978, Pask became more heavily involved in Ministry of Defence projects; yet he was struggling to keep his own company viable. The company later disbanded in the early 1980s, whereby he moved on to teach for a time at Concordia University and then the University of Amsterdam (in the Centre for Innovation and Co-operative Technology), and the Architectural Association in London, where he acted as a doctoral supervisor for Ranulph Glanville. During the early 1980s, Pask co-authored Calculator Saturnalia (1980) with the help of Ranulph Glanville and Mike Robinson, which consisted of a collection of games to play on a calculator; he also co-authored Microman Living and Growing with Computers (1982) with Susan Curran Macmillan. Edward Barnes asserts that during this period, his work on conversation theory "was further refined during the 1980s and until Pask's death in 1996 by his research group in Amsterdam. This latter refinement is called interaction of actors (IA) theory". (Note: Pask's interaction of actors theory is noted here as being mostly incomplete, with its contents being dispersed across his later articles of this period, and an unpublished manuscript co-authored with Gerard de Zeeuw.)

According to Glanville, Pask semi-retired on 28 June 1993. During the last few years of his life, Pask set up the company Pask Associates, a management consultancy firm, whose clients included the Club of Rome, Hydro Aluminium, and the Architecture Association. He also provided some preliminary work for a project on behalf of the London Underground and received initial support from Greenpeace International at the Imperial College London's Department of Electronics for a project in quantitative chemical analysis. He obtained a ScD from his college, Downing Cambridge in 1995, and later died on 29 March 1996 at the London Clinic.

== Legacy and impact ==
Pask's primary contributions to cybernetics, educational psychology, learning theory, and systems theory, as well as to numerous other fields, were his emphasis on the personal nature of reality, and on the process of learning as stemming from the consensual agreement of interacting actors in a given environment ("conversation").

In later life, Pask benefited less often from the critical feedback of research peers, reviewers of proposals, or reports to government bodies in the US and UK. Nevertheless, his publications were considered a storehouse of ideas that are not fully theorized.

Ted Nelson, who coined the concept of hypermedia, references Pask in his book Computer Lib/Dream Machines.

Pask acted as a consultant to Nicholas Negroponte, whose earliest research efforts at the Architecture Machine Group on Idiosyncrasy and software-based partners for design have their roots in Pask's work.

== Personality ==
Andrew Pickering argues that Pask was a "character" in the traditional British sense of the term, as he likens both Stafford Beer and Grey Walter. His dress sense was eccentric and flamboyant for his time, adopting the dress of an Edwardian dandy with his signature bow tie, double-breasted jacket, and cape. His sleep pattern, later in life, was described as "nocturnal" and would often begin his work at night and sleep during the day. Mallen meanwhile has suggested: "He ran his life on a 36-hour rhythm which meant sleep times and meal times seldom coincided with those of us on normal 24-hour diurnal rhythms. Nevertheless the theories and ideas which came of the resulting late night conversations were intellectually very stimulating, if physically demanding". Furtado Cardoso Lopes notes that even from an early age, it was "Pask's curiosity, interdisciplinarity and interest in the complex nature of things that fuelled his incursion into cybernetics".

Pask's "power to inspire [others] was evident throughout his working life". He was noted by his former colleagues as being capable of great kindness and generosity, (Note: Barnes (2001), who studied under Gregory Bateson, notes of having received an informal certificate by Pask after having requested Pask to teach him cybernetics. They saw each other for private lessons for the last two years of Pask's life, and he even received an informal certificate from Pask (p.545)) yet also sometimes the utter disregard for the individuals he associated himself with. Part of this was due to his view that "conflict is a source of cognitive energy and thereby a means for moving a system forward more rapidly". According to Luis Rocha, "Conflict was in fact one of his preferred tools to achieve consensual understanding between participants in a conversation".

This generation of conflict, however, is noted to have sometimes driven those around him further away than he would have preferred. This is evidenced in his own technological pursuits, where "His touch-typing tutor pushed the learner harder and harder, to the point where the rate of learning is greatest but also closest to the brink of system collapse". While his friends and colleagues often recognized his genius, they would also acknowledge him as being at times difficult to get along with, as well as "some need[ing] time to recover".

He mellowed in later years and, inspired by his wife Elizabeth, converted to Roman Catholicism, which according to Scott, "deeply satisfied his need for understandings that address the great mysteries of life". Even with this mellowing, however, his innate intensity of character and interests was nonetheless always there.

== Personal views ==
=== Artificial Intelligence ===
According to Paul Pangaro, a former collaborator and PhD student of his, Pask was critical of certain interpretations of artificial intelligence which were common during the eras he was active in. Alex Andrew has argued that Pask's interest in what is now labelled as "artificial intelligence", came from his general interest "in constructing artefacts with brain-like properties". Pangaro claims that Pask had managed to simulate intelligence-like behaviours with electro-mechanical machines in the 1950s, with Pangaro further arguing "By realising that intelligence resides in interaction, not inside a head or box, his path was clear. To those who didn't understand his philosophical stance, the value of his work was invisible [to them]". The emphasis for Pask, according to Pangaro, was that human intellectual activity existed as part of a kind of resonance that looped from a human individual through an environment or apparatus, back through to the individual. (Note: This looping-throughness as Pangaro (2001) puts it, is a key characteristic of Pask's theory of intelligence.)

=== Cybernetics ===
Pask took a broad understanding of what cybernetics entailed. Unlike physics, cybernetics had in Pask's mind no necessary commitment to a particular image as to what constitutes the environment. Instead, the focus is on the observations one makes via observation. Pask saw it as mistaken to view cybernetics reductively. For him, cybernetics was not merely a derivative of other disciplines or applied science. Instead, Pask held true to Norbert Wiener's original vision by acknowledging that cybernetics attempts to provide a unifying framework for various disciplines by establishing "a common language and set of shared principles for understanding the organization of complex systems".

== Work ==
=== Colloquy of mobiles ===
Pask participated in the seminal exhibition "Cybernetic Serendipity" (ICA London, 1968) with the interactive installation "Colloquy of Mobiles", continuing his ongoing dialogue with the visual and performing arts. (cf Rosen 2008, and Dreher's History of Computer Art)

=== Fun Palace ===
Pask collaborated with architect Cedric Price and theatre director Joan Littlewood on the radical Fun Palace project during the 1960s, setting up the project's 'Cybernetics Subcommittee'.

=== Musicolour ===
Musicolour was an interactive light installation developed by Pask in 1953. It responded to musicians' variations and, if they did not vary their playing, it would become 'bored' and stop responding, prompting the musicians to respond.

Musicolour was influential on Cedric Price's Generator project, via the work of consultants Julia and John Frazer.

=== SAKI ===
SAKI (self-adaptive keyboard machine) was an adaptable keyboard machine created by Pask which fostered interactivity between user and machine.

=== Thoughtsticker ===
Thoughtsticker (written as THOUGHTSTICKER) was described by Pask and his fellow collaborators in the 1970s as a special type of educational operating system. (Note: It may be better described today as a type of educational software or educational application.) In the operating system, a user makes a concrete model or collection of concrete models in the concrete modeling facility of that operating system. The user then sets out to describe why and how the model or collection of models relates to satisfying some overarching goal or thesis via describing their cognitive model or personal construct of that relation in the cognitive modeling facility of that operating system. In explaining why and how the model or collection of models satisfies the goal or thesis, the user may add to their original concrete model, or provide new descriptions of topics for their cognitive model that had not been sufficiently elaborated upon. Compared to Pask's EXTEND unit, Thoughtsticker was said to exteriorize the innovation of ideas in learning, whereas EXTEND merely permitted and recorded the product of such a process.

== Selected publications and projects ==
Pask wrote extensively and contributed to a variety of institutions, journals, and publishing houses. Many items in the following list of publications have been identified at the Pask archive at the University of Vienna.

=== Books ===
- Pask, Gordon (1961a). An Approach to Cybernetics. London: Methuen.
- ——— (1975a). The Cybernetics of Human Learning and Performance. London: Hutchinson.
- ——— (1975b). Conversation, cognition and learning. Netherlands: Elsevier.
- ——— (1976a). Conversation Theory, Applications in Education and Epistemology. Netherlands: Elsevier.
- ———; Glanville, Ranulph; Robinson, Mike (1981). Calculator Saturnalia, Or, Travels with a Calculator : A Compendium of Diversions & Improving Exercises for Ladies and Gentlemen. London: Wildwood House.
- ———; Curran, Susan (1982). Microman Living and growing with computers. London: MacMillan.

=== Book chapters and sections ===
- Pask, Gordon (1960). "The Natural History of Networks". In Yovits, M.C; Cameron, S (eds.). Self Organising Systems. London: Pergamon Press. pp. 232–261.
- ——— (1960). "The Teaching Machine as a Control Mechanism". In Glaser, R; Lumsdaine, A (eds.). Teaching Machines and Programmed Learning. Vol. 1. Washington: Nat. Ed. Assoc. pp. 349–366.
- ——— (1960). "Adaptive Teaching with Adaptive Machines". In Glaser, R; Lumsdaine, A (eds.). Teaching Machines and Programmed Learning. Vol. 1. Washington: Nat. Ed. Assoc.
- ——— (1961). "A Proposed Evolutionary Model". In von Foerster, H; Zopf, G (eds.). Principles of Self Organisation. London: Pergamon Press. pp. 229–254.
- ——— (1962). "The Simulation of Learning and Decision Making Behaviour". In Muses, C (ed.). Aspects of the Artificial Intelligence. New York: Plenum Press. pp. 165–210.
- ——— (1963). "Discussion of the Cybernetics of Learning Behaviour". In Weiner, N; Schadé, J.P. (eds.). Nerve, Brain and Memory Models. Amsterdam: Elsevier Publishing Co. pp. 75–214.
- ——— (1964). "A Proposed Experimental Method for the Behavioural Sciences". In Weiner, N; Schadé, J.P. (eds.). Progress in Biocybernetics. Vol. 1. Amsterdam: Elsevier Publishing Co. pp. 171–180.
- ——— (1962). "Interaction Between a Group of Subjects and An Adaptive Automaton to Produce a Self-organising System for Decision-Making". In Yovits, M.C.; Jacobi, G.T.; Goldstein, G.D. (eds.). Self Organising Systems. Washington: Spartan Books. pp. 283–312.
- ——— (1962). "Musicolour". In Good, I.J. (ed.). The Scientist Speculates. London: Heinemann. pp. 135–136.
- ——— (1962). "Self-organising Pumps and Barges". In Good, I.J. (ed.). The Scientist Speculates. London: Heinemann. pp. 140–142.
- ——— (1962). "Can Thinking Make It So?". In Good, I.J. (ed.). The Scientist Speculates. London: Heinemann. p. 173.
- ——— (1962). "My Prediction for 1984". In Bannister, R (ed.). Prospect. London: Hutchinson. pp. 207–220.
- ——— (1963). "The Conception of a Shape and the Evolution of a Design". In Jones, J.C.; Thornley, D.G. (eds.). Conference on Design Methods. London: Pergamon Press. pp. 153–168.
- ——— (1964). "Adaptive Teaching Machines". In Austwick, K (ed.). Teaching Machines. London: Pergamon Press. pp. 79–112.
- ——— (1964). "A Discussion of Artificial Intelligence and Self-organisation". In Rubinoff, M (ed.). Advances in Computers. Vol. 5. New York: Academic Press. pp. 110–226.
- ——— (1968). "Man as a System that Needs to Learn, Stewart". In Stewart, D (ed.). Automation Theory and Learning Systems. London: Academic Press. pp. 137–208.
- ——— (1964). "Ampassungfähige Lehrmaschinen zur Gruppenschulung". In Frank, H (ed.). Kybernetische Machinen. Frankfurt: S. Fischer-Verlag.
- ——— (1966). "Comments on the Cybernetics of Ethical, Psychological and Sociological Systems". In Schadé, J.P. (ed.). Progress in Biocybernetics. Vol. 3. Amsterdam: Elsevier.
- ———; Lewis, B.N. (1965). "The Theory and Practice of Adaptive Teaching Systems". In Glaser, R (ed.). Teaching Machines and Programmed Learning. Data and Directions. Vol. 2. Washington: National Educational Association. pp. 213–266.
- ——— (1965). "Comments on the Organisation of Man, Machines and Concepts". In Heilprin; Markussen; Goodman (eds.). Education for Information Science. Spartan Press and Macmillan. pp. 133–154.
- ——— (1967). "A Look into the Future". In Goldsmith, M (ed.). Mechanisation in the Classroom. Souvenir Press. pp. 185–267.
- ——— (1972). "Adaptive Machines". In Davies, I.K.; Hartley, J (eds.). Contributions to an Educational Technology. London: Butterworths. pp. 57–69.
- ——— (1969). "A Method for Studying the Fluctuations and Divisions of Attention when the Level of Goal Achievement is held at a Constant Value". In Shumilina, V. (ed.). Systems of Study of The Brain Functional Organisation. Russia. A volume dedicated to Professor P. Anohkin.
- ——— (1970). "Cognitive Systems". In Garvin, P.I. (ed.). Cognition, a Multiple View. New York: Spartan. pp. 394–405.
- ——— (1970). "The Meaning of Cybernetics in the Behavioural Sciences". In Rose, J (ed.). Progress in Cybernetics. Vol. 1. Gordon and Breach. pp. 15–45. Reprinted in Cybernetica No 3 1970, 140–159, and in No 4 1970, 240–250. Reprinted in Artorga Communications, 140-148
- ——— (September 1970). "Teaching Machines". In Rose, B (ed.). Modern Trends in Education. Macmillan. pp. 216–259.
- ——— (September 1969). "Des Machines Qui Apprennant". In Schellars, A; Godwin, F (eds.). Les Dossier de la Cybernetique, Schellars. Marabout Universite, 150 Fresses Gerard, Verviers, Belgium. pp. 147–157.
- ——— (1970). "A Comment, A Case History and A Plan". In Reichardt, J (ed.). Cybernetic Serendipity. Rapp. And Carroll.Reprinted in Cybernetics, Art and Ideas, Reichardt, J., (Ed.) Studio Vista, London, 1971, 76-99
- ——— (1969). "Learning and Teaching Systems". In Rose, J (ed.). Survey of Cybernetics. Iliffe Books. pp. 163–186.
- ——— (1973). "Die Automatisierung des Unterrichts unde die Natur des Lernens". In Rollet, H.B.; Weltner, K. (eds.). Fortschrift unde Ergebnisse des Bildungsterchnologie. Vol. 5. Ehrenwirth Verlag. pp. 86–111.
- ——— (1973). "Principous de Aprendizagem e de control". Cybernetica e Comunicado. University of Sao Paulo: Editôra Cultrix.
- ——— (1973). "Artificial Intelligence – a Preface and a Theory". In Negroponte, N. (ed.). Machine Intelligence in Design. MIT Press.
- ——— (1975). "Various contributions". The Cybernetics of Cybernetics. Biological Computing Laboratory, University of Illinois.
- ——— (1975). "Abridged form of Conversation, Cognition and Learning". Applications in Education and Epistemology. Vol. 2. Institution of Engineering and Technology – via Open University.
- ——— (1975). "Regulation of General Evolving Systems: Symbols, Needs and Hunger in a Formal Ecology". In Booth, D.A. (ed.). Hunger Models: Quantitative Theory of Feeding Control. London and New York: Academic Press. pp. 434–449.
- ——— (1976). "Cybernetics in Psychology and Education". In Trappl, R (ed.). Cybernetics, A Source Book. Washington: Hemisphere Publishing Corp.
- ——— (1979). "A Conversation Theoretic Approach to Social Systems". In Geyer, F; van der Zouwen, J (eds.). Sociocybernetics, an Actor Oriented Social Systems Theory. Amsterdam: Martinus Nijhof, Social Systems Section. pp. 15–26.
- ——— (1980). "Introductory Comments". In Pichler, F; de Hanika, F.P. (eds.). Progress in Cybernetics and General System Research. Hemisphere Publishing Corp. pp. 279–280.
- ——— (1980). "Consciousness". In Pichler, F; de Hanika, F.P. (eds.). Progress in Cybernetics and General System Research. Hemisphere Publishing Corp. pp. 343–368.
- ——— (1981). "In Contrast to Scandura". In Lasker, G (ed.). Applied Systems and Cybernetics. Vol. II. New York: Pergamon Press. pp. 760–769.
- ——— (1981). "Developments in Conversation Theory: Actual and Potential Application". In Lasker, G (ed.). Applied Systems and Cybernetics. Vol. III. New York: Pergamon Press. pp. 1325–1338.
- ——— (1983). "Some Relation between Personal Construct Theory and Conversation Theory, between Grids and Meshes". In Shaw, M; Kean, T (eds.). Practicalities of Personal Construct Theory. Montreal: CyberSystems Publishing.

=== Conference proceedings ===
- Pask, Gordon (1958). Teaching Machines. Proc.2nd Congress Intnl Assoc of Cybernetics. Namur: Gauthier Villars. pp. 961–968.
- ——— (1958). The Growth Process in the Cybernetic Machine. Proc. 2nd Congress, Intnl Assoc of Cybernetics. Namur: Gauthier Villars. pp. 765–794.
- ——— (1958). Uttley, A (ed.). Physical Analogues to the Growth of a Concept. Mechanisation of Thought Processes. Vol. 2. National Physics Laboratory, London: H.M.S.O. pp. 877–922.
- ——— (1961). Adaptive Systems and their Possible Applications in Medicine. Proc. 1st Congress Medical Cybernetics. Naples.
- ——— (1961). The Cybernetics of Evolutionary Processes and of Self Organising Systems. Proc. 3rd Congress Intnl Assoc of Cybernetics. Namur: Gauthier Villars. pp. 27–74.
- ——— (1961). Self-organising System of a Decision Making Group. Proc. 3rd Congress Intnl Assoc of Cybernetics. Namur: Gauthier-Villars. pp. 814–827.
- ——— (1961). A Cybernetic Model of Concept Learning. Proc. 3rd Congress Intnl Assoc of Cybernetics. Namur: Gauthier-Villars.
- ——— (1961). Interaction between Man and an Adaptive Machine. Proc. 3rd Congress, Intnl Assoc of Cybernetics. Namur: Gauthier-Villars. pp. 951–964.
- ——— (1962). Popplewell, C.N. (ed.). The Logical Type of Illogical Evolution. Proc. IFIP Congress 62. Amsterdam: North Holland Pub. Co. pp. 482–483.
- ——— (1962). The Logic and Behaviour of Self-organising Systems, as Illustrated by the Interaction of Man and Adaptive Machine. Intl Symposium Information Theory. Brussels.
- ——— (1963). Bellinger, L.E.; Truxal, J.G.; Minnar, E.J. (eds.). Physical and Linguistic Evolution in Self-organising Systems. Proc. 1st IFAC Symposium on Optimising and Adaptive Control. Pittsburgh: Instrument Society of America. pp. 199–225.
- ——— (1962). "A Cybernetic Model of Human Data Processing". In Gerard, R.W. (ed.). Information Processing in the Nervous System. Intnl Congress Series No 40. Vol. 3. Leiden: Excerpta Medica. pp. 218–233.
- ——— (1963). Self-organising Systems Involved in Human Learning and Performance. Proc. 3rd Bionics Symposium. Dayton, Ohio: USAF. pp. 247–335 – via ASTIA.
- ——— (1963). Steinbuch, K; Wagner, S.W. (eds.). Statistical Computation and Statistical Automata. Neuere Erketnisse der Kybernetick. Oldenburg. pp. 69–81.
- ——— (1963). A Model for Concept Learning. 10th Intnl Congress on Electronics. Rome. pp. 73–105 – via Fondazione Ugo Bordoni.
- ——— (1963). "A survey by Gordon Pask". Automatic and Remote Control: Proceedings of the Congress. International Federation of Automatic Control conference. London: Butterworth. pp. 393–411.
- ——— (1964). Tests for Some Features of a Cybernetic Model of Learning. Symposium on Cybernetic Problems in Psychology. Humboldt University, DDR, Berlin.
- ———; Lewis, B.N.; Watts, D. (December 1964). A Typical Adaptively-controlled Experiment in Perceptual Discrimination. London Conference of British Psychological Society. London: Butterworth.
- ——— (1964). Cybernetic Approach to the Experimental Psychology of Learning. 3rd Congress Intnl Assoc Medical Cybernetics. Naples.
- ——— (1964). Report on Cybernetic Experimental Method. 4th Congress Intnl Assoc of Cybernetics. Naples: Gauthier-Villars. pp. 645–650.
- ———; Mallen, G.L. (1965). "The Method of Adaptively Controlled Psychological Learning Experiments". Theory of Self Adaptive Control Systems. IFAC Symposium. Teddington: Plenum Press. pp. 70–86 – via Amer. Instru.
- ——— (1964). Results from Experiments on Adaptively Controlled Teaching Systems. Proc 4th Con Intnl Assoc of Cybernetics. Namur: Gauthier-Villars. pp. 129–138.
- ——— (1966). Adaptively Controlled Experiments in Learning and Concept Acquisition. Proc 18th Intnl Con of Psychology. Moscow: Akademi Verlag.
- ———; Breach (1966). "A Cybernetic Model for Some Types of Learning and Mentation". In Oestreicher, H.C.; Moore, D.R. (eds.). Cybernetic Problems in Bionics. Bionics Symposium. Dayton, Ohio. pp. 531–585.
- ——— (August 1968). "Some Mechanical Concepts of Goals, Individuals, Consciousness and Symbolic Evolution". In Bateson, C (ed.). Extracts in Our Own Metaphor. Wenner-Gren Conf on the Effects of Conscious Purpose on Human Adaptation. Knopf.
- ——— (1967). Comments on Men, Machines and Communication Between Them. Vision 67 Conference. New York.
- ——— (1968). "Adaptive Machines". Programmed Learning Research. Proc. NATO Symposium on Major Trends in Programmed Learning Research. Nice: Dunod. pp. 251–261.
- ——— (1967). "A Learning Model Capable of "Attention" and Hampered by "Boredom" and "Fatigue"". The Simulation of Human Behaviour. Proc. NATO Symposium on the Simulation of Human Behaviour. Paris: Dunod. pp. 53–54.
- ——— (1969). Interaction between a Teaching Machine and the Student's Attention Directing System. Proc 16th Intnl Conf of Applied Psychology. Amsterdam: Swets and Zeitlinger. pp. 209–280.
- ——— (1967). Some Advances in Adaptively Controlled Teaching Systems. Proc 5th Conf Intnl Assoc of Cybernetics. Namur: Gauthier-Villars. pp. 256–260.
- ——— (1967). Adaptive Metasystems. Proc. 5th Intnl Con on Cybernetics. Namur: Gauthier-Villars.
- ——— (1970). Annett, J; Duke, J (eds.). Computer Assisted Learning and Teaching. Proceedings of the Leeds Seminar on Computer Based Learning. NCET. pp. 50–63.
- ——— (1970). Sheepmaker, R (ed.). Fundamental Aspects of Educational Technology, illustrated by the Principles of Conversational Systems. Proceeding IFIP World Conference on Computer Education. Vol. 1. Amsterdam.
- ——— (July 1966). Lectures on the Philosophy of Cybernetics. Summer School Adaptive and Lernende Systems in Biologie and Technick at the University of Berlin. University of Berlin.
- ——— (July 1970). Essay on the Ethics and Aesthetics of Control. Wenner-Gren Symposium on the Moral and Aesthetic Structure of Human Adaptation. Burg Wartenstein.
- ——— (1966). von Foerster, H (ed.). Models for Social Systems and Their Languages. Wenner-Gren Symposium. Vol. 1. Instructional Science. pp. 39–50.
- ——— (May 1968). "Education 2000". In Lewis, B.N.; Pyne, R.W. (eds.). New Directions in Educational Technology. East Burnham Conference on Educational Technology.
- ——— (1973). Tobinson, H.W.; Knight, D.E. (eds.). Learning Strategies, Memory and Mind, in Artificial Intelligence. Proceedings of the 4th Annual Symposium of the American Society of Cybernetics. New York: Spartan Books.
- ——— (August 1973). How People Learn and What People Know. Proceedings NATO Conference on Cybernetic Modelling of Adaptive Organisations. Porto, Portugal.
- ——— (September 1973). Richmond, K (ed.). The Nature and Nurture of Learning in a Social Educational System. Proceedings Agnelli Foundation International Symposium on Lifelong Learning in an Age of Technology: Prospects and Problems. Turin.
- ——— (1972). Hanika, F. de P.; Trappl, R. (eds.). A Cybernetic Theory of Cognition and Learning. Symposium in 1st European Meeting on Cybernetics and Systems Research. Vol. 5. Vienna: Journal of Cybernetics. pp. 1–80.
- ——— (1975). Scandura; Duram; Wolfech (eds.). An Outline of Conversational Domains and their Structure. Proceedings from 5th Annual Interdisciplinary Conference. MERGE ONR. pp. 231–251.
- ——— (January 1975). Learning to Live in the Future, Presidential Address to the Society for General Systems Research. New York: Society for General Systems Research. Reprinted in Policy Analysis and System Science, 1977.
- ——— (1977). Trappl, R (ed.). Minds and Media in Education and Entertainment: Some Theoretical Comments Illustrated by the Design and Operation of a System for Exteriorising and Manipulating Individual Theses. Proceedings of the 3rd European Meeting on Cybernetics and Systems Research. Vienna.
- ——— (1977). Revisions in the Foundation of Cybernetics and General System Theory as a Result of Research in Education, Epistemology and Innovation (Mostly in Man Machine Systems). Proceedings 8th Intl Con in Cybernetics. Namur, Belgium.
- ——— (1976). Learning Systems – Student Management. Proceedings Learning Management Based on Formal Models of Behaviour and Aptitudes in CAI. UCODI Summer School, Louvain, Belgium.
- ——— (1976). Position Paper. Conference Meeting on Mind Body Dualism. Co-evolution Quarterly. San Francisco – via Point Foundation. Event chaired by Gregory Bateson.
- ——— (1977). Knowledge, Innovation and "Learning to Learn". Proceedings of NATO-ASI Structural/Process Theories of Complex Human Behaviour. Banff Springs, Canada: Noordhoff. pp. 259–350.
- ——— (1977). Organisational Closure of Potentially Conscious Systems, and Notes. Proceedings NATO Congress on Applied General Systems Research. Prestentations took place at Recent Developments and Trends conference in Binghampton, New York and the Realities Conference via the EST Foundation at San Francisco. Reprinted in Autopoiesis (1981), Zelany, M., (Ed.) New York, North Holland Elsevier, 1981, 265-307.
- ——— (1976). "Various contributions". In Pask, Gordon; Trappl, R (eds.). Cognition and Learning. Proceedings 6th European Meeting on Cybernetics and Systems Research. Hemisphere.
- ———, ed. (1975–1977). Decision Making in Complex Systems. ARI conference, Richmond. Vol. 1–2. Washington: ARI.
- ——— (March 1978). Consciousness. Proceedings, 4th European Meeting on Cybernetics and System Research. Linz, Austria. In Journal of Cybernetics, Hemisphere, Washington, 211-258, published in 1978.
- ——— (April 1978). A Cybernetic and Conversation Theoretic Approach to Conscious Events in Learning and Innovation. Proceedings 23rd Annual Conference of JUREMA. Zagreb, Yugoslavia.
- ——— (August 1978). Observable Components of the Decision Process and a Revised Theoretical Position. Proceedings 3rd Richmond Conference on Decision Making in Complex Systems. Washington: AREI 80-11.
- ——— (1978). The Poverty of Mainstream Science and the Indolence of Cybernetics. President’s Address in Proceedings Cybernetic Society Conference. Brunel University.
- ——— (1979). van Trotsenberg, E.A. (ed.). Learning to Learn. European Association for Research and Development in Higher Education, Third Congress in Klagenfurt, Special Seminar S3 in Higher Education, A Field Study. Vol. 1. Lang, Klagenfurt. (with Entwistle, N.J. and Hounsell, D.)
- ——— (August 1979). Against Conferences: The Poverty of Reduction in Sop-Science and Pop-Systems. Proceedings of Silver Anniversary International Meeting of Society for General Systems Research. London: SGSR. pp. xiii–xxv.
- ——— (August 1979). An Essay on the Kinetics of Language, Behaviour and Thought. Proceedings of Silver Anniversary Intl Meeting of Society for General Systems Research. London: SGSR. pp. 111–126.
- ——— (1979). An Essay on the Kinetics of Language as illustrated by a Protologic Lp. Proceedings workshop on Fuzzy Formal Semiotic and Cognitive Processes, 2nd Congress of the International Assoc for Semiotic Studies. Vienna. Reprinted in Ars Semiotica III, 93-127, Amsterdam, John Benjamin, 1980.
- ——— (1980). Lavington, S (ed.). The Limits of Togetherness. Proceedings in Information Processing. Amsterdam: North Holland Publishing Co. pp. 999–1012. Invited Address to IFIP World Congress in Tokyo and Melbourne.
- ——— (April 1980). Trappl, R (ed.). Concepts, Coherence and Language. Proceedings 5th European Meeting on Cybernetics and Systems Research. Vienna: ARI. Vol XI, Progress in Cybernetics and Systems Research, 1982, 421-432, Hemisphere and John Wiley.
- ———; Robinson, M, eds. (1983). Proceedings. Fourth Richmond Conference on Decision Making in Complex Systems. Washington: ARI.
- ——— (1980). Trappl, R; Riccardi, C; Pask, G (eds.). Some Generalisations of Conversation Theory and Proto-language Lp. Proceedings 5th European Meeting on Cybernetics and Systems Theory. Progress in Cybernetics and Systems Research, 1982, 407-420, Hemisphere and John Wiley.
- ——— (1981). A Computer Implemented Protologic for Representing Coherence Amongst the Distinctions Between Parts of Knowledge. Proceedings of the American Society for Cybernetics. Washington: American Society for Cybernetics.
- ———; Glanville, R (1981). New Cybernetics. Proceedings of the American Society for Cybernetics. Washington: American Society for Cybernetics.
- ——— (1983). Lansky, M (ed.). Conversation Theory. Proceedings of Systems in Education. Paderborn: FEOLL.

=== Journal articles ===
- Pask, Gordon (April 1957). "Automatic Teaching Techniques". British Communications and Electronics.
- ——— (April 1957). "A Teaching Machine for Radar Training". Automation Progress: 214–217.
- ——— (July 1958). "Electronic Keyboard Teaching Machines". Journal of the National Association for Education and Commerce.
- ——— (1958). "Organic Control and the Cybernetic Method". Cybernetica. 3.
- ——— (1959). "Artificial Organisms". General Systems Yearbook. 4: 151–170.
- ——— (February 1959). "Control Systems that Learn from Experience". Automation Progress: 43–57.
- ———; von Foerster, H (1960). "A Predictive Evolutionary Model". Cybernetica. 4: 20–55.
- ——— (1962). "An Adaptive Automaton for Teaching Small Groups". Perceptual and Motor Skills. 14 (2): 183–188. doi:10.2466/pms.1962.14.2.183. S2CID 144757671.
- ——— (1963). "Machines that Interact with Man". ASLIB Proceedings. 15 (4): 104–105. doi:10.1108/eb049924.
- ———; Bailey, C.E.G. (1961). "Artificial Evolutionary Systems". Automatika. 4.
- ——— (1964). "Adaptive Teaching Systems". Cybernetica. 2: 125–143.
- ——— (1963). "The Use of Analogy and Parable in Cybernetics, with Emphasis upon Analogies for Learning and Creativity". Dialectica. 2–3 (2–3). Neuchatel, Suisse: 167–202. doi:10.1111/j.1746-8361.1963.tb01562.x.
- ———; B.N., Lewis (1964). "The Development of Communication Skills under Adaptively Controlled Conditions". Programmed Learning. 1 (2): 59–88.
- ——— (1965). "Tests for Some Features of a Cybernetic Model of Learning". Zeitschrift für Psychologie. 171.
- ———; Feldman, R (1966). "Tests for a Simple Learning and Perceiving Artefact". Cybernetica. 2: 75–90.
- ——— (1965). "Man/machine interaction in Adaptively Controlled Experimental Conditions". The Bulletin of Mathematical Biophysics. 27 (Suppl): 261–73. doi:10.1007/BF02477282. PMID 5884136.
- ——— (1966). "A Brief Account of Work on Adaptively Controlled Teaching Systems". Kybernetika. 4. Academia Praha: 287–299.
- ——— (June 1966). "Le Intelligenze Artificiali". Sapere. 17 (678): 346–348.
- ———; Lewis, B.N. (April 1967). "The Adaptively Controlled Instruction of a Transformation Skill". Programmed Learning. 4 (2): 74–86. doi:10.1080/1355800670040202.
- ——— (June 1967). "The Control of Learning in Small Subsystems of a Programmed Educational System". IEEE Transactions on Human Factors in Electronics. 8 (2): 88–93. Bibcode:1967ITHFE...8...88P. doi:10.1109/THFE.1967.233625.
- ——— (November 1966). "Men/machines and Control of Learning". Educational Technology. 6 (22).
- ———; Lewis, B.N. (May 1968). "The Use of Null Point Method to Study the Acquisition of Simple and Complex Transformation Skills". British Journal of Mathematical and Statistical Psychology. 21: 61–84. doi:10.1111/j.2044-8317.1968.tb00398.x.
- ——— (1969). "The Computer-Simulated Development of Populations of Automata". Mathematical Biosciences. 4 (1–2). Elsevier Press: 101–127. doi:10.1016/0025-5564(69)90008-X.
- ——— (October 1969). "Strategy, Competence and Conversation as Determinants of Learning". Programmed Learning. 6 (4): 250–267. doi:10.1080/1355800690060404.
- ——— (September 1969). Landau, R (ed.). "The Architectural Relevance of Cybernetics". Architectural Design: 494–496.
- ———; Scott, B.C.E. (November 1971). "Learning and Teaching Strategies in a Transformation Skill". British Journal of Mathematical and Statistical Psychology. 24 (2): 205–229. doi:10.1111/j.2044-8317.1971.tb00467.x.
- ——— (June 1971). "Interaction Between Individuals, Its Stability and Style". Mathematical Biosciences. II (1–2). American Elsevier Publication: 59–84. doi:10.1016/0025-5564(71)90008-3.
- ——— (January 1972). "A Cybernetic Experimental Method and its Underlying Philosophy". International Journal of Man-Machine Studies: 279–337.
- ——— (April 1971). "A Review of Research on Learning under this and previous contracts. Its Application to the Teaching, Training and Evaluation of Problem Solving Skills". System Research.
- ——— (1972). "A Fresh Look at Cognition and the Individual". International Journal of Man-Machine Studies. 4 (3): 211–216. doi:10.1016/S0020-7373(72)80002-6.
- ——— (September 1972). "Anti-Hodmanship: A Report on the State and Prospect of CAI". Programmed Learning and Educational Technology. 9 (5): 211–216. doi:10.1080/1355800720090502.
- ———; Scott, B.C.E. (1972). "Learning Strategies and Individual Competence". International Journal of Man-Machine Studies. 4 (3): 217–253. doi:10.1016/S0020-7373(72)80004-X.
- ———; Scott, B.C.E. (1973). "CASTE: A System for Exhibiting Learning Strategies and Regulating Uncertainty". International Journal of Man-Machine Studies. 5: 17–52. doi:10.1016/S0020-7373(73)80008-2.
- ———; Scott, B.C.E.; Kallikourdis, D (1973). "A Theory of Conversations and Individuals (Exemplified by the Learning Process on CASTE)". International Journal of Man-Machine Studies. 5 (4): 443–566. doi:10.1016/S0020-7373(73)80002-1.
- ——— (1972). Landau, R (ed.). "Complexity and Limits". Architectural Design. 10: 622–624.
- ———; Shimura, M (1974). "Some Properties of Transmission Lines Composed of Random Networks". Mathematical Biosciences. 22: 155–178. doi:10.1016/0025-5564(74)90089-3.
- ———; Shimura, M (1974). "Some Properties of Transmission Lines Composed of Random Networks". Mathematical Biosciences. 22: 155–178. doi:10.1016/0025-5564(74)90089-3.
- ———; Kallikourdis, D; Scott, B.C.E. (1975). "The Representation of Knowables". International Journal of Man-Machine Studies. 17: 15–134. doi:10.1016/S0020-7373(75)80003-4.
- ——— (1976). "Conversational Techniques in the Study and Practice of Education". British Journal of Educational Psychology. 46 (1): 12–25. doi:10.1111/j.2044-8279.1976.tb02981.x.
- ——— (1976). "Styles and Strategies of Learning". British Journal of Educational Psychology. 46 (2): 128–148. doi:10.1111/j.2044-8279.1976.tb02305.x.
- ——— (1977). "Commentary on Scandura J.M., Problem Solving". Journal of Structural Learning. 6: 335–346.
- ——— (1980). "Developments in Conversation Theory – Part 1". International Journal of Man-Machine Studies. 13 (4): 357–411. doi:10.1016/S0020-7373(80)80002-2.
- ——— (1996). "Heinz von Foerster's Self-Organisation, the Progenitor of Conversation and Interaction Theories". Systems Research. 13 (3): 349–362. doi:10.1002/(SICI)1099-1735(199609)13:3<349::AID-SRES103>3.0.CO;2-G.

=== Miscellaneous ===
- Pask, Gordon (1962). "Teaching Machines". USSR Encyclopaedia on Automata Production and Industrial Electronics. Moscow.
- ——— (1964). An Investigation of Learning under Normal and Adaptively Controlled Conditions (PhD). University of London.
- ——— (1968). Colloquy of mobiles. London: Institute of Contemporary Arts.
- ——— (1968). "Cybernetics". Encyclopaedia Britannica. Vol. 6. p. 963b.
- ——— (1969). "Psychology, Use of Models (Learning)". Encyclopaedia of Linguistics, Information and Control. Pergamon Press. pp. 101–127.
- ——— (1976). Miscellaneous contributions to Microfiche BCL publications (Report). Champaign/Urbana: Biological Computer Laboratory. Includes Cybernetics of Cybernetics, available in reduced paperback form from Intersciences Publications, Seaside, California.
- ——— (1978). The Importance of Being Magic, Special Edition, Forum, in honour of Dr Heinz von Foerster (Report). American Society for Cybernetics.
- ——— (1992b). Interactions of Actors, Theory and Some Applications.
- ——— (n.d.). Saturnalia, book and pictures and lyrics.
- USA Expired US2984017A, Andrew Gordon Speedie Pask, "Apparatus for assisting an operator in performing a skill", published 16 May 1961, issued 16 May 1961

=== Periodicals ===
- Pask, Gordon; Wiseman, D (November 1959). "Teaching Machines". The Overseas Engineer.
- ———; Wiseman, D (November 1959). "Electronic Teaching Machines". Control Engineering.
- ——— (June 1961). "Machines that Teach". New Scientist.
- ——— (November 1961). "Cybernetics Becomes a Well Defined Science". Control.
- ——— (1962). "Machines à Enseigner". Cegos. Paris.
- ——— (1963). "Comments on Semantic Machines". Artorga. No. 49.
- ——— (March 1964). "Viewpoint". Control.
- ——— (February 1964). "Thresholds of Learning and Control". Data and Control.
- ——— (February 1965). "Advertising as a Symbolic Game". Advertising Quarterly.
- ——— (April 1965). "Teaching as a Control-Engineering Process". Control.
- ——— (1976). F. Kopstein (ed.). "Teaching Machines Revisited in the Light of Conversation Theory". Educational Technology Magazine. pp. 30–44.
- ——— (1976). N. Negroponte (ed.). "Comments and Suggestions". Architecture Machinations. Vol. II, no. 33. Cambridge, MA: The MIT Press. pp. 2–12.
- ——— (November 1976). "Ongoing Research at System Research Ltd". International Cybernetics Newsletter. No. 7–9.
- ——— (Autumn 1978). "Chairman's report: Symposium on Cybernetics of Cognition and Learning, EMSCR 78". International Cybernetics Newsletter, Journal of Cybernetics. No. 9. Linz, Austria: Hemisphere Publishing. pp. 4–5.

=== Reports and technical reports ===
- Pask, Gordon (December 1959). "The Self Organising Teacher". Automated Teaching Bulletin (Report). Vol. 1–2. The Rheem-Califone Corp.
- ——— (1959–1960). Technical Reports (Miscellaneous) on Self Organising Systems (Technical report). University of Illinois.
- ——— (1962). "Comments on an Indeterminacy that Characterises a Self-organising System". In Caianello, E.R. (ed.). Cybernetics of Neural Processes: Course Held at the International School of Physics (Technical report). Consiglio Nazionale delle Richerche. pp. 1–30 – via NATO at the Istituto Di Fisica Teorica, Università Di Napoli.
- ——— (1962). A Model for Learning Applicable within Systems Stabilised by an Adaptive Teaching Machine (Report). USAF.
- ——— (1964). Proposals for a Cybernetic Theatre (Report). System Research Ltd.
- ———; Lewis, B.N. (1961–1965). "Research on the Design of Adaptive Teaching Systems with a Capability for Selecting and Altering Criteria for Adaptation". Miscellaneous Reports under USAF Contract No AF61(052)-402 (Report). ASTIA.
- ———; Lewis, B.N. (1962–1965). "Research on Cybernetic Investigation of Learning and Perception". Miscellaneous Reports under USAF Contract No AF61(052)-640 (Report). ASTIA.
- ———; Lewis, B.N. (1963–1965). "A Study of Group Decision Making and Communication Patterns under Conditions of Stress and Overload when the Participants are Permitted to Function as Self-Organising Systems". Miscellaneous Reports on US Army Contracts DA-91-591-EUC-2753 and DA-91-591-3607 (Report). ASTIA.
- ——— (1967). Adaptive Teaching Systems (Technical report). Univ. of Leeds: British Association for the Advancement of Science.
- ——— (June 1967). Allebe, A (ed.). Some Difficulties Encountered in Psychological Experiments on Learning. BP Review (Report).
- ——— (1970). Cybernetics and Education (Report). Paper at Academic Session, delivered to H.M. King Baudoin of Belgium: Intnl Assoc of Cybernetics.
- ——— (October 1970). SCRIPTS – Organisation and Instruction of Office Skills Involving Communication Data Retrieval and Data Recognition (Technical report). Department of Employment.
- ——— (June 1971). Domestic Consumer Response Prediction. Report on Phase B of the Project for the North Thames Gas Board (Report). System Research Ltd.
- ———; Scott, B.C.E. (December 1970). Learning Strategies and Individual Competence (Technical report). National Library, Harrogate, UK: SSRC.
- ———; Scott, B.C.E. (December 1970). CASTE Manual (Technical report). Vol. I–V. National Library, Harrogate, UK: System Research Ltd.
- ———; Scott, B.C.E. (January 1972). Uncertainty Regulation in Learning Applied to Procedures for Teaching Concepts of Probability (Technical report). National Library, Harrogate, UK: System Research Ltd. – via Final Scientific Report SSRC Research Grant HR 12031.
- ——— (June 1970). Driving Strategies for Learner Drivers (Technical report). Road Research Laboratory – via Final Scientific Report SSRC Research Grant HR 12031.
- ———; Brieske, G (March 1971). Description of the Driver Communication Training Module (Technical report). Road Research Laboratory.
- ———; Scott, B.C.E. (June 1973). Educational Methods using Information about Individual Styles and Strategies of Learning (Technical report). System Research Ltd. Final Scientific Report SSRC Grant No HR 1424/1.
- ———; Scott, B.C.E.; Kallikourdis, D (1974). Entailment and Task Structures for Educational Subject Matter (Technical report). System Research Ltd. Final Scientific Report SSRC Grant No HR 1876/1.
- ——— (September 1973). Joint Report on SSRC Projects HR 1876/1 and HR 1424/1 (Report). System Research Ltd.
- ——— (May 1973). An Invention Relying upon the Value of "Invention", Intnl Symposium on the History and Philosophy of Technology (Technical report). Univ. of Illinois at Chicago Circle. In School of Information Science Reports, Institute of Technology, Atlanta, Georgia, 1973.
- ——— (1973). Partial Analysis of A Course in Education (Technical report). Open University Monograph.
- ———, ed. (1975). Summary Report of Conference on Scientific Approaches to Decision Making in Complex Systems (Technical report). Washington: ARI. Convened by the European Research Office, London and the US Army Research Institute for the Behavioural and Social Sciences.
- ——— (1975). Applications and Developments of a Theory of Teaching and Learning, Final Report (Technical report). Vol. 1–2. SSRC. Contract number: SSRC HR 2371/1
- ———; Malik, R (1976). Course Assembly Manual (Technical report). SSRC.
- ——— (November 1976). T O’Shea (ed.). Summary of Work at System Research Ltd (Technical report). AISB Newsletter.
- Hawkridge, D; Lewis, B. N.; MacDonald-Ross, M.; Pask, G.; Scott, B.C.E. (1976). System Analysis of an Open University Course for New Methods for Evaluation and Curriculum Design (Technical report). Vol. II. IET and Ford Foundation.
- Pask, G; Bailey, R; Ensor, E; Malik, R; Newton, R; Scott, B.C.E.; Watts, D (1976). Course Assembly (Thoughtsticker) Manual (Technical report). System Research Ltd.
- Ensor, D; Malik, R; Pask, G; Scott, B.C.E. (1976). "Forms III, V, VI". "Cartoons" Tests for learning "style" (Technical report). System Research Ltd.
- Pask, Gordon (1977). General Problem Solving (Technical report). IET – via Open University and Ford Foundation.
- ——— (1974–1978). "Learning Styles, Educational Strategies and Representation of Knowledge, Methods and Applications". Progress Report SSRC Research Programme HR 2708/2 (Technical report). Vol. 1–4. SSRC.
- ——— (1975–1977). "The Influence of Learning Strategy and Performance Strategy upon Engineering Design". Progress Report (Technical report). Vol. 1–8. ARI. Includes Scientific notes (1-5). Grant USAF F 44620.
- ——— (1976–1978). "Cognitive Mechanisms and Behaviours Involved in other than Institutional Learning and Using Principles of Decision". Progress Report (Technical report). Vol. 1–2. ARI. Grant ARI DAERO 76-G-069.
- ——— (1978). "Summary of Some Points Emerging from a Discussion of Development in the Mexican Educational System at the Foundation Barros Sierra, the Ministry of Education and elsewhere in Mexico". Internal Memorandum to Fundacion Barros Sierra (Technical report). Mexico: System Research Ltd.
- ——— (1979). Statistical Analysis of Tests for Learning Style in a Sequential Administration of these and Other Tests (Technical report). System Research Ltd – via SSRC.
- ——— (1980). Automation: Coherence in Organisations and People who Form Part of Them, Factory Automation (Technical report). Maidenhead: Infotech Int Ltd.

== Footnotes ==
1. Glanville (1993b) and Scott & Glanville (2007) contain a list of Pask's various publications and projects. For information on the Pask archives, see Müller (2007) for the University of Vienna archive and Pangaro (2007) for the North America archive.
2. For Gordon Pask's main works of conversation theory, see Pask (1975a), Pask (1975b), and Pask (1976a) respectively.
3. Pickering (2009) notes that his brother Edgar was described by Pask as his hero and role model. Edgar was noted to have fought in World War II, and "carried out a series of life threatening experiments on himself aimed at increasing the survival rate of piolets" (p. 310). Edgar was thrown into pools unconscious to examine the properties of life jackets, thrown into the icy waters of Shetland, and so on. Pickering notes that this presented a hard act to follow for Pask, but "he did, in his own unusual way" (p. 311).
4. McKinnon-Wood (1993) claims Pask to have been studying Psychology at the time; whereas Scott (2007) claims Pask to have been studying Physiology.
5. Furtado Cardoso Lopes (2009, p. 27) notes that Pask's entrance into cybernetics dates to around this time. He had begun to accumulate early additions of the works of Wiener and Shannon.
6. Pickering (2009) notes that Pask had fallen in love with the world of the arts through a school friend who ran a traveling cinema company in Wales (p. 313).
7. Beer (1993) claims this would have been 40 years prior to the publication of his article, implying the date of their meeting would have been 1953 (p. 13). However, no exact confirmation of their first meeting is given to Beer. He also notes his "abysmal memory" (p. 14), such that the correctness of specific details in Beer's account cannot be confirmed.
8. Cariani (1993) argues that the "Mechanization of Thought Processes" conference was likely the last large interdisciplinary meeting on general problems relating to artificial intelligence during the 20th century (p. 22). It contained people from direct programming (McCarthy, Minsky, Backus, Hopper, Bar-Hillel), neural nets (Selfridge, Uttley), cybernetics (Ashby, Pask), and neurophysiology (Barlow, McCulloch, Whitfield).
9. Scott (2007) states the event occurred in 1959 (p. 33), while Cariani (1993) states the event took place in November 1958 (p. 22).
10. McCulloch (2016) expresses issue with the view that the organic evolution occurs through a brute force trial-and-error style process. He suggests other parameters must be at play which leads to the emergence of viable organisms: “I believe they are sought in the nature of her building blocks, [subatomic] particles, atoms, and molecules, proceeding discretely through well-regulated autocatalytic reactions to produce cells and cell aggregates, or, as in Pask's example, crystals" (p. 251).
11. Scott (2007) is of the opinion that Pask's primary emphasis in his activity was not system building or inventing. Instead, he was a thinker or theoretician who wanted to embed his theory in tangible artefacts (p. 32).
12. Mallen later went on to help found the Computer Arts Society in 1968, alongside Alan Sutcliffe and John Lansdown.
13. Pask's interaction of actors theory is noted here as being mostly incomplete, with its contents being dispersed across his later articles of this period, and an unpublished manuscript co-authored with Gerard de Zeeuw.
14. Barnes (2001), who studied under Gregory Bateson, notes of having received an informal certificate by Pask after having requested Pask to teach him cybernetics. They saw each other for private lessons for the last two years of Pask's life, and he even received an informal certificate from Pask (p.545)
15. This looping-throughness as Pangaro (2001) puts it, is a key characteristic of Pask's theory of intelligence.
16. It may be better described today as a type of educational software or educational application.
