= Lars Löfgren =

Swedish cybernetician (1925–2013)

Lars Löfgren (1925 – 2013) was a Swedish cybernetician. He was awarded the Wiener Gold Medal by the American Society for Cybernetics in 2008.

Löfgren was involved in extending the logical and linguistic approaches to various problems raised by early cybernetics. His work helped develop a more consistent conceptual base for cybernetics through a holistic approach to second order cybernetics.

Löfgren was one of the internationally renown cyberneticians invited by Heinz von Förster to the Biological Computer Laboratory, but he did most of his work while professor at Lund University.

== Works ==
- (1996) "Shadows of language in physics and cybernetics", Systems Research, 13(3), 329–340.
- (2002) "What is systems science?" in Robert Trappl (Ed.), Cybernetics and systems 2002 (Vol. 1, pp. 11–16). Austrian Society for Cybernetic Studies.
