= Biological Computer Laboratory =

US research institute

The Biological Computer Laboratory (BCL) was a research institute of the Department of Electrical Engineering at the University of Illinois Urbana-Champaign. It was founded on 1 January 1958, by then Professor of Electrical Engineering Heinz von Foerster. He was head of BCL until his retirement in 1975.

The focus of research at BCL was systems theory and specifically the area of self-organizing systems, bionics, and bio-inspired computing; that is, analyzing, formalizing, and implementing biological processes using computers. BCL was inspired by the ideas of Warren McCulloch and the Macy Conferences, as well as many other thinkers in the field of cybernetics.

In the first decade of its existence, BCL was primarily a non-teaching research lab. Although students could work at BCL, they were not trained.

Until 1965, many researchers had a visiting professorship at BCL: W. William Ainsworth (England), Alex Andrew (England), W. Ross Ashby (England), Gordon Pask (England), Gotthard Günther (USA, Germany), Dan Cohen (Israel), Lars Löfgren (Sweden), Humberto Maturana (Chile), Francisco Varela (Chile), Ernst von Glasersfeld (Austria), Stafford Beer (England), John C. Lilly (USA). Ashby (since 1961) and Günther (since 1967) received regular professorships, and Löfgren and Pask remained in constant contact with BCL even after their visiting professorship.

BCL was financed primarily by grants. This came in part from military organizations such as U.S. Air Force and U.S. Navy which, in the 1950s and 60s, possessed large budgets for basic research. Non-military donors included the Department of Health, Education and Welfare, Public Health Service, National Institutes of Health, National Science Foundation, Wenner-Gren Foundation for Anthropological Research in New York, National Aeronautics and Space Administration, Electronics Research Center, Boston, Massachusetts Office of Education, Bureau of Research, Washington, DC and the Point Foundation in San Francisco, California. With the beginning of the 1970s, military research funding became limited to projects that provided militarily useful results, and von Foerster was unable to identify adequate sponsors. In 1974, the BCL was closed due to lack of research funds.

== Sources ==
- Albert Mueller, A brief history of the BCL. In: Austrian Journal of History. 11 (1), 2000, pp. 9–30.
- Bernard Scott, Heinz von Foerster obituary, The Independent, 25 October 2002.
- Heinz von Foerster, Understanding systems: Conversations on epistemology and ethics, Springer, 2002.

== Books ==
Albert Muller, Karl Muller (eds), An Unfinished Revolution?: Heinz von Foerster and the Biological Computer Laboratory / BCL 1958–1976, Edition Echoraum, 2007.
