= Lawrence J. Fogel =

American computer scientist

- Born: 2 March 1928; Brooklyn, New York, U.S.
- Died: 18 February 2007 (aged 78); San Diego, California, U.S.
- Education: New York University (B.E.E., 1948), Rutgers University (M.S. Electrical Engineering, 1952), University of California, Los Angeles (Ph.D., 1964)
- Spouse: Eva Fogel
- Engineering career
- Discipline: Electrical engineering Aerospace engineering Computer science

Dr. Lawrence Jerome Fogel (March 2, 1928 – February 18, 2007) was a pioneer in evolutionary computation and human factors analysis. He is known as the inventor of active noise cancellation and the father of evolutionary programming. His scientific career spanned nearly six decades and included electrical engineering, aerospace engineering, communication theory, human factors research, information processing, cybernetics, biotechnology, artificial intelligence, and computer science.

== Aerospace engineering and antenna design ==
During 1948-1949, shortly after completing his bachelor's degree in electrical engineering from New York University, Lawrence Fogel worked at Watson Laboratories (USAF) computing radiation patterns for VHF and UHF radio direction finders for use in ground-to-air operations. He designed feedback amplifier filters to improve the signal-to-noise ratio for these radio systems. At Eglin Air Force Base, he controlled the final flight test program for the Diversity Antenna Array. Between 1950 and 1953, Fogel worked for Coles Signal Laboratory (U.S. Army Signal Corps) as an engineer in charge of the installation of electronic communication and navigation equipment in Army aircraft and helicopters. He completed his master's degree in electrical engineering at this same time from Rutgers University. During his time with Stavid Engineering, Inc. (New Jersey) between 1953 and 1956, he directed field operations of the Regulus Missile guidance system for submarines and also assisted with the design of flight instrumentation, communications, and electronics for aircraft and helicopters. As a part of this research, he formulated a solution for a mathematical model of the human operator as part of an aircraft flight control system that included such qualities as anticipation, development of a computer facility incorporating such a mode for use in the design of more effective human-machine relations. His efforts also led to five patents between 1958 and 1961 regarding active noise cancellation to reduce noise in helicopter cockpit environments for improved communication. These were the first patents in noise-cancelling headphone systems.

== Information theory and human factors research ==
Fogel was also interested in information theory and communications, especially those associated with aircraft instrument displays. He published several articles intended to link communication theory and instrument design., These investigations led to other strategies to help with air traffic control, as this was similar to the information transfer of knowledge to humans that was experienced in the cockpit.

== General Dynamics – Convair ==
In 1956, Fogel moved to San Diego, California to work for Convair, a division of General Dynamics Corporation. He worked as head of the Reliability Group with the responsibility for maintaining and improving the overall reliability of systems such as the F-102 Delta Dagger, F-106 Delta Dart, Convair 880 transport, and other missile and electronics products. He was responsible for human engineering systems design and analysis for manned aircraft. Fogel initiated a program of investigation into the use of anticipatory displays that allow the pilot to "fly ahead" of the aircraft system being controlled. He invented and patented a new display called the "Kinelog," which for the first time offered the pilot inter-sensory compatibility as a protection against the onset of vertigo.

== National Science Foundation ==
On leave from Convair, Lawrence Fogel served as Special Assistant to the Associate Director (Research) at the National Science Foundation (NSF) from July 1960 to July 1961. While at the NSF, Fogel represented the Associate Director at technical and professional meetings related to the merit of individual research proposals or to the effect of national policies on future manpower and economic and military strength. He devised mathematical models for the projection of the economic value of science funding. These projections were coordinated with many agencies including the Department of Defense, National Aeronautics and Space Administration, Department of Health, Education, and Welfare, and the United States Atomic Energy Commission. This effort culminated in a report to the U.S. Congress on the worth of investing in scientific progress. While at NSF, Fogel's interest in cybernetics, biotechnology, and consciousness led to a hypothesis that a simulation of evolution on computers could be used to generate artificial intelligence without the need for expert systems. These theories were first tested successfully upon his return to Convair in 1961.

In 1960, Fogel served as a member of the founding editorial board for the journal IRE Transactions on Human Factors in Electronics. He remained as a part of that editorial board as that journal transitioned to the IEEE and became IEEE Transactions on Man-Machine Systems, a predecessor to IEEE Systems, Man, and Cybernetics.

== General Dynamics – astronautics ==
While at Convair during 1961–1965, Fogel explored evolutionary programming for time-series prediction. These experiments validated the merit of the approach and this became the basis of Fogel's Ph.D. dissertation "On the Organization of Intellect" at the University of California, Los Angeles where he received the Ph.D. in 1964 in biotechnology with minors in mathematics and communication theory. His was the first dissertation in the field of evolutionary computation. The dissertation became the basis of several papers as well as the first book in the field of evolutionary computation Artificial Intelligence Through Simulated Evolution co-authored with Alvin Owens and Michael Walsh, also from Convair. Fogel continued to publish on these concepts in the scientific literature.

In his role as Senior Staff Scientist in Astronautics for General Dynamics, he provided improved the reliability of complex missile systems and information processing systems. Fogel devised the COFEC Reliability Data System for the Atlas rocket. The Atlas was built at Convair in San Diego as America's first intercontinental ballistic missile. The Atlas D was used for Project Mercury to launch astronauts into low-Earth orbit in the 1960s. He also focused on how humans sense and process information.

Fogel also became associated with the burgeoning field of cybernetics and served as the third president of the American Society for Cybernetics in 1969, following Warren McCulloch. He also served as the founding editor-in-chief for the Journal of Cybernetics and helped organize the second and third annual symposia of the American Society for Cybernetics (1964, 1965).

== Evolutionary programming ==
In 1965, Fogel left General Dynamics to form a new company, Decision Science, Inc. in San Diego, specifically for applications of evolutionary programming. He served as president and directed research and real-world applications in the areas of information science, computer simulation, prediction, and systems control. Decision Science, Inc. was the first company specifically applying evolutionary computation to solve real-world problems. The methods were further developed through the efforts of Alvin Owens and George Burgin and formed the basis of a new generation of flight simulator first deployed at Langley Research Center for the purpose of air-to-air combat training. This approach was called the Adaptive Maneuvering Logic. While at Decision Science, Fogel and Burgin also experimented with simulations of co-evolutionary games. He also continued applying evolutionary computation in many ways including modeling of human operators and thinking about biological communication.

In 1982, Decision Science, Inc. was acquired by the Titan Corporation, a defense contractor in San Diego. Fogel continued working as a vice president at Titan, and later in 1988 as a vice president of ORINCON Corporation. In 1993, he was a co-founder in the formation of a new company, Natural Selection, Inc., which continues to apply methods of computational intelligence to real-world problems. Lawrence Fogel was the president of Natural Selection, Inc. until his death in 2007.

== Personal life ==
Fogel was also well known for his interest in radio-controlled sailboats and sailplanes. He was a passionate enthusiast and preservation advocate for Torrey Pines Gliderport in San Diego. In the 1970s, he wrote a monthly column on RC soaring for Model Builder magazine. He was twice president of the Torrey Pines Gulls R/C Soaring Club, co-founded the Torrey Pines Scale Soaring Society, and was president of the National Soaring Society from 1975 to 1977. He was recognized with the highest membership grade of Fellow by the Academy of Model Aeronautics in 1996 and was inducted into the Academy of Model Aeronautics Hall of Fame in 2024.

Fogel also enjoyed music and was proficient on piano, flute, saxophone, clarinet, and other instruments. He often enjoyed playing jazz at the Catamaran Hotel and other locations in San Diego and Washington, D.C.

== Professional societies ==
- Acoustical Society of America
- American Rocket Society
- American Society for Cybernetics
- Evolutionary Programming Society
- Human Factors Society of America
- Institute of Radio Engineers
- Institute of Electrical and Electronics Engineers (Fellow)
- International Association for Cybernetics
- New York Academy of Sciences (Life Member)
- Society for Industrial and Applied Mathematics

== Scientific honors ==
- IEEE Fellow
- 1996 - Lifetime Achievement Award, Evolutionary Programming Society
- 1998 - IEEE Neural Networks Council Pioneer Award in Evolutionary Computation (inaugural awardee)
- 2003 - SPIE Computational Intelligence Pioneer Award (jointly with his son David B. Fogel)
- 2006 - IEEE Frank Rosenblatt Award (inaugural awardee)

== Patents ==
1. U.S. patent 2,866,848 - Method of Improving Intelligence Under Random Noise Interference - 1958 December 30
2. U.S. patent 2,920,138 - System for Improving Intelligibility - 1960 January 5
3. U.S. patent 2,960,906 - Advance Flight Control Instrumentation and Control System - 1960 November 22
4. U.S. patent 2,966,549 - Apparatus for Improving Intelligence Under High Ambient Noise Levels - 1960 December 27
5. U.S. patent 5,214,746 - Method and Apparatus for Training a Neural Network using Evolutionary Programming - 1993 May 25
6. Canadian Patent 631136 - Method of Improving Intelligence Under High Ambient Noise Levels - 1961 November 14

== Selected journal publications ==
- Fogel, L. J. "The Human Computer in Flight Control," IRE Transactions on Electronic Computers, Vol. EC-6, No. 3, pages 197-202, 1957.
- Fogel, L. J. "A New Concept: The Kinalog System," Journal of the Human Factors Society, Vol. 1, No. 2, pages 30–37, April 1959.
- Fogel, L. J. and Lyman J "The Human Component," Chapter 2 in Volume 3 of The Handbook of Automation, Computation, and Control, edited by E. M. Grabbe, S. Ramo, and D. E. Woolridge, John Wiley and Sons, Inc., New York, 1961.
- Fogel, L. J. "Autonomous Automata," Industrial Research Magazine, Vol. 4, No. 2, pages 14–19, February 1962.
- Fogel, L. J., Owens AJ, and Walsh, MJ "On the Evolution of Artificial Intelligence," Proceedings of the Fifth National Symposium on Human Factors in Electronics, IEEE, San Diego, May 5–6, 1964, pages 63–76.
- Fogel, L. J., Owens AJ, and Walsh, MJ "An Evolutionary Prediction Technique," IEEE International Symposium on Microwaves, Circuit Theory, and Information Theory, September 1964, pages 173-174.
- Fogel, L. J., Owens AJ, and Walsh, MJ "Artificial Intelligence Through a Simulation of Evolution," Chapter 14 of Biophysics and Cybernetic Sciences Symposium, edited by M. Maxfield, A. Callahan, and L. J. Fogel, Spartan Book Co., Washington, D.C., pages 131-155.
- Fogel, L. J., Owens AJ, and Walsh, MJ "Application of Evolutionary Programming," IEEE Systems Science and Cybernetics Conference, October 17 and 18, 1966, Washington, D.C.
- Fogel, L. J., "Inanimate Intellect Through Evolution," Naval Research Reviews, Vol. XX, No. 11, November 1967, pages 9–18.

== See also ==
- David B. Fogel
- Gary B. Fogel

== Selected books ==
- Fogel, Lawrence J. Biotechnology: Concepts and Applications. Prentice Hall, New York, 1963. (reprinted in 2012 by Literary Licensing, LLC).
- Maxfield, Miles, Callahan, Arthur, and Fogel, Lawrence J. Biophysics and Cybernetic Systems: Proceedings of the Second Cybernetic Sciences Symposium. Allan Hancock Foundation., 1965.
- Fogel, Lawrence J., Owens, A.J., and Walsh, M.J. Artificial Intelligence Through Simulated Evolution. Wiley. New York, 1966.
- Fogel, Lawrence J. Progress in Biomedical Engineering. Spartan Books. 1967.
- Fogel, Lawrence J. Human Information Processing. Prentice Hall, New York, 1967.
- Amosov, N.M., Finegold, L. and Fogel, Lawrence J. Modeling of Thinking and the Mind. Spartan Books. New York, 1967.
- Fogel, Lawrence J. Composite Index to Marine Science and Technology. Alfo Publishing Co., San Diego, 1968.
- Fogel, Lawrence J. Intelligence Through Simulated Evolution: Forty Years of Evolutionary Programming Wiley-Interscience, New York, 1999.

== Other information ==
- American Society for Cybernetics legacy page
- IEEE Frank Rosenblatt Award winners
- Biography in model aviation
