= Henri Atlan =

French biophysicist and philosopher (born 1931)

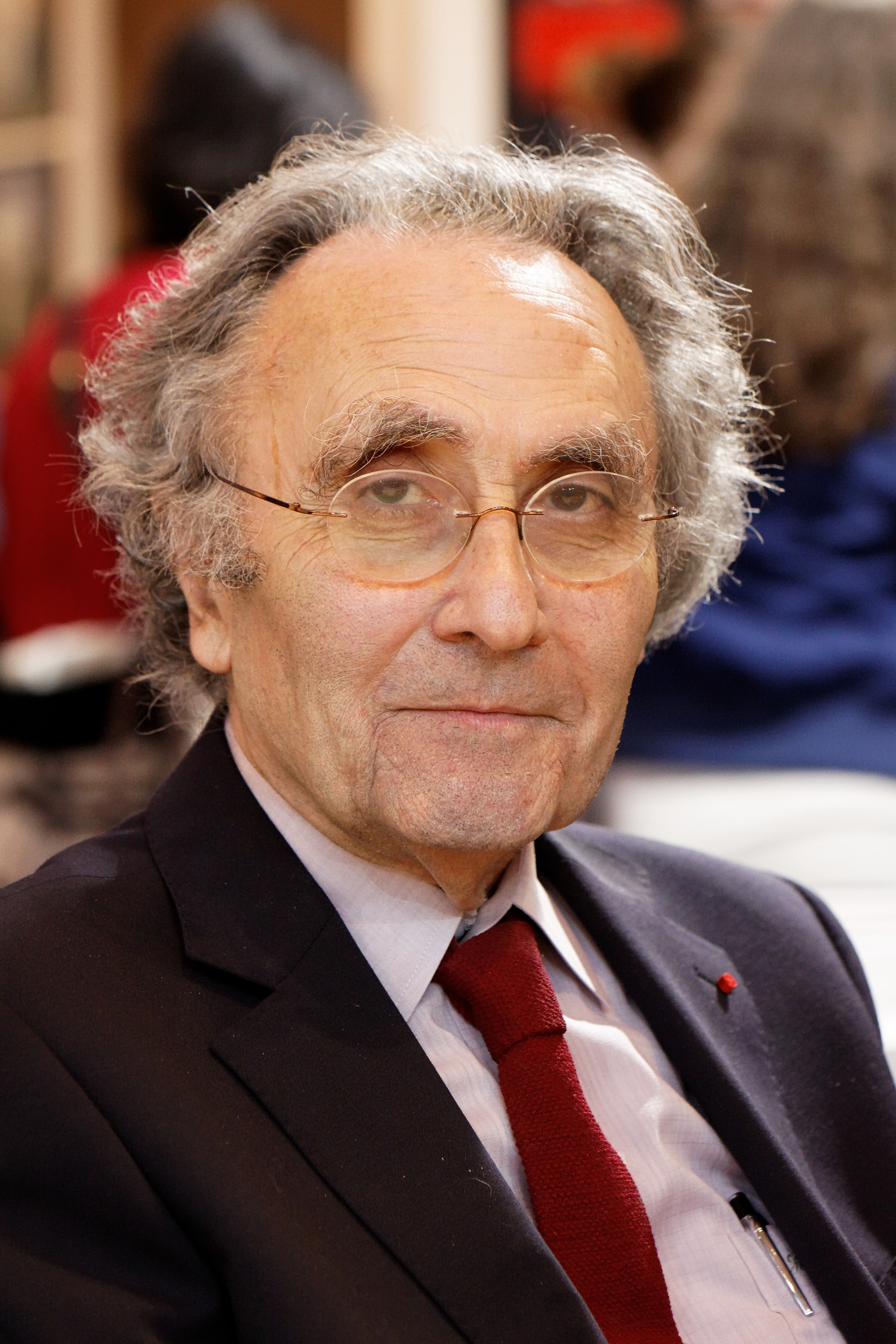
- Henri Atlan in 2011
- Born: 27 December 1931 (age 94); Blida, French Algeria
- Education: University of Paris
- Known for: Complexity from noise
- Spouse: Liliane Atlan (m. 1952)
- Children: 2
- Scientific career
- Fields: Biophysics; cybernetics; information theory; philosophy

Henri Atlan (born 27 December 1931) is a French biophysicist and philosopher.

== Early life and education ==
Born to a Jewish family in French Algeria, Atlan gained degrees in medicine and biophysics at the University of Paris (now University Paris Diderot). He married Liliane Atlan in 1952; they had two children while living in Paris, Miri in 1953 and Michael in 1956. He then moved to the University of California, Berkeley working on ageing and mutation.

== Career and thought ==
Influenced by Heinz von Foerster, Atlan became interested in applying cybernetics and information theory to living organisms, and went to the Weizmann Institute in Rehovot to work under the biophysicist Aharon Katchalsky. In 1972, he returned to Paris; and, in that year, his 1972 work on information theory and self-organising systems, entitled L'organisation biologique et la théorie de l'information, received a wide readership. In this book, he proposed the principle of "complexity from noise" (French: le principe de complexité par le bruit), concept taken up in his following book Entre le cristal et la fumée (1979) and development of 1960 Von Foerster's notion of "order from noise". In Paris, he then taught biophysics at the Hôtel-Dieu and, later, at the Hebrew University of Jerusalem's Hadassah Medical Center.

His participation with Francisco Varela at a conference in Cerisy-la-Salle encouraged interest in cognitive science in France. Atlan was instrumental in the establishment of the Centre de Recherche en Epistémologie Appliquée (CREA) at the École Polytechnique, and was appointed in 1983 to the Comité Consultatif National d'Éthique pour la Sciences de a Vie et de la Santé (National Advisory Committee on Ethics in the Life Sciences and Medicine). He is director of studies in the philosophy of biology at the École des Hautes Études en Sciences Sociales, and professor emeritus of biophysics at the University of Paris VI: Pierre et Marie-Curie. He is also a member of Collegium International, an organization of leaders with political, scientific, and ethical expertise whose goal is to provide new approaches in overcoming the obstacles in the way of a peaceful, socially just, and an economically sustainable world.

== Works ==
- Atlan, Henri (2011), Selected Writings: On Self-Organization, Philosophy, Bioethics, and Judaism, Fordham Univ Press, ISBN 9780823231812
- L'organisation biologique et la théorie de l'information, 1972
- Atlan, H. (June 1974). "On a formal definition of organization". Journal of Theoretical Biology. 45 (2). Elsevier: 295−304. Bibcode:1974JThBi..45..295A. doi:10.1016/0022-5193(74)90115-5. PMID 4844620.
- Entre le cristal et la fumée: Essai sur l'organisation de vivant, 1979
- À tort et à raison: Inter-critique de la science et du mythe, 1986
- Tout, non, peut-être: Education et vérité, 1991
- Atlan, Henri; Bousquet, Catherine (1994), Questions de vie : Entre le savoir et l'opinion
- Les étincelles de hasard, 1999
