= Julius Hecker =

Julius Hecker is the name of:

- Johann Julius Hecker (1707–1768), German educator
- Julian F. Hecker (also known as Julius Hecker) (1881–1938), Russian-American Christian minister
