= Larry Richards =

American academic and engineer

Laurence Dale Richards (born 1946) is an American academic and engineer. He has been a key figure in the modern development (since 1981) of cybernetics as a transdisciplinary field of inquiry, often referred to as the new cybernetics. He was the first to create interdisciplinary masters and doctoral programs in engineering management, with curricula built explicitly on concepts drawn from systems theory and cybernetics. He served as president for both the American Society for Cybernetics (1986–88) and the American Society for Engineering Management (1998–99) and was elected an Academician in the International Academy for Systems and Cybernetic Sciences in 2010.

== Biography ==
Richards was born in Ann Arbor, Michigan and grew up in Orono, Maine. He received his bachelor's degree in electrical engineering from the University of Maine (1968). While serving as a pilot in the U.S. Marine Corps, he earned master's degrees in aeronautical systems from the University of West Florida (1970) and business administration from Mississippi State University (1974). He received his Ph.D. in operations research from the Wharton School at the University of Pennsylvania (1980). Notable accomplishments included: Founding Chair of the Department of Engineering Management at Old Dominion University (1984–97); founding executive director of the Center for Commercial Space Infrastructure (1992–95), which subsequently morphed into the Virginia Space Flight Center and commercial spaceport on Wallops Island; Founding Dean of the School of Management and Aviation Science (1997-2004) at Bridgewater State University; inaugural Executive Vice Chancellor for Academic Affairs (2004–15) and Interim Chancellor (2012–13) at Indiana University East; and, Interim Vice Chancellor & Dean for the Indiana University – Purdue University Columbus campus (2015–16). He retired from Indiana University in 2016 as Professor Emeritus of Management and Informatics.

== Work ==
Richards' contributions can be sorted into three areas: (1) his development of constraint theory as an approach to the formulation of policy and technology strategy; (2) his advancement of the concepts associated with cybernetics as representing a new and powerful way of thinking; and (3) his application of cybernetic ideas to the design of a participative-dialogic society.

=== Constraint theory ===
In his book, Constraint Theory, Richards proposed that, in addressing problems and issues in complex systems involving many participants, desires be treated as constraints rather than as goals or objectives (as they are in traditional operations research problem formulation). In research for NASA, he applied constraint theory to the development of an approach for formulating policy on the selection of new space transportation systems, given the extreme uncertainty in the technologies that will be available by the time a new system becomes operational.

=== Cybernetics ===
Richards recognized a unique potential in the cybernetic version of systems thinking for addressing complex behavioral and social phenomena. He focused on the ideas of hierarchy, purpose and belief to highlight differences between the process-oriented thinking of cybernetics and, for example, whole systems thinking, teleological or purposeful systems thinking, and ideological systems thinking. He proposed that: (1) cybernetics be treated as a way of thinking about ways of thinking (of which it – cybernetics – is one), making the way of thinking a choice; and, (2) the cybernetician be treated as a craftsperson in and with time, merging art, science and design.^{[4]}

=== Designing (a) society ===
Since its inception in 1992, Richards was a guest at the School for Designing a Society in Urbana, Illinois. A premise of the school was that social change can be realized in a transformation from the current to a new society (a change of system), not only in improvements to the current society (changes in a system). Richards saw in the cybernetic concept of conversation a particular dialogic with special relevance to processes of design and participation; from this, he created an idea for a participative-dialogic society, a society without violence or at least one where violence is the alternative of last resort. This idea, he argued, would require a change of thinking.

== Awards and honors ==
In 2002, Richards was elected a Fellow of the American Society for Engineering Management (#33) and was awarded the Norbert Wiener Medal of the American Society for Cybernetics in 2007.

== Publications ==
Richards published over 100 books, monographs, journal/magazine articles, and conference papers. These represent a selection (see also the references):

- 2017 From goal-oriented to constraint-oriented design: The cybernetic intersection of design theory and systems theory. Leonardo 50(1): 36–41 (with Thomas Fischer).
- 2015 Designing academic conferences in the light of second order cybernetics. Constructivist Foundations 11(1): 65–73.
- 2014 Education as a subversive activity: A proposal. Kybernetes 43(9-10): 1392–1398.
- 2010 The anticommunication imperative. Cybernetics and Human Knowing. 17(1-2):11-24.
- 2009 Craft and Constraint, Clocks and Conversation: A Larry Richards Reader 1987 – 2007, Jason Marrero, Ed.
- 2007 Connecting radical constructivism to social transformation and design. Constructivist Foundations 2(2-3): 129–135.
- 1996 Propositions on cybernetics and social transformation: Implications of von Foerster's non-trivial machine for knowledge processes. Systems Research 13(3): 363–369 (with Rochelle K. Young).
- 1985 The systems approach in an information society: A reconsideration. Journal of the Operational Research Society 36(9): 833–843 (with Shiv K. Gupta).
- 1979 Cybernetics and the management science process. OMEGA, The International Journal of Management Science 8(1): 71–80.
- 1979 A language for policy-level modelling. Journal of the Operational Research Society 30(4): 297–308 (with Shiv K. Gupta).
