= The purpose of a system is what it does =

Systems thinking heuristic

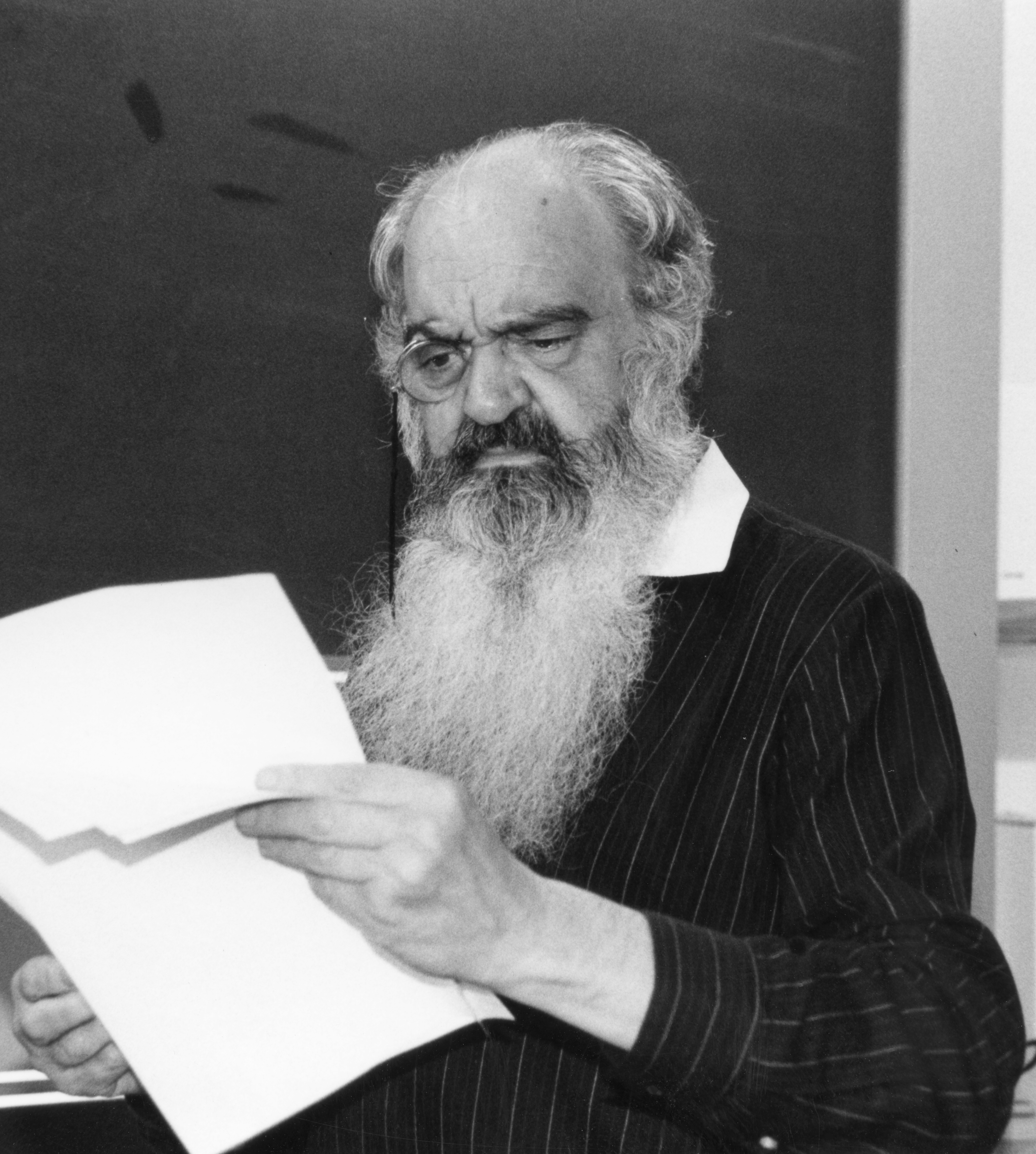
Stafford Beer, who coined the heuristic in 1979

The purpose of a system is what it does (POSIWID) is a heuristic in systems thinking coined by the British management consultant Stafford Beer, who stated that there is "no point in claiming that the purpose of a system is to do what it constantly fails to do". It is used in systems theory, and is generally invoked to counter the notion that the purpose of a system can or should be read from the intentions of those who design, operate, or promote it. When a system's side effects or unintended consequences reveal that its behaviour is poorly understood, then the POSIWID perspective can balance political understandings of system behaviour with a more straightforwardly descriptive view.

== Origins ==
Beer used the phrase in his 1979 book The Heart of Enterprise, and subsequently many times in public addresses. Speaking to the University of Valladolid in October 2001, he said:

According to the cybernetician, the purpose of a system is what it does. This is a basic dictum. It stands for bald fact, which makes a better starting point in seeking understanding than the familiar attributions of good intention, prejudices about expectations, moral judgement, or sheer ignorance of circumstances.

== Uses ==
Organizations establish principles that define their ideal purpose; POSIWID proposes that the organization's actual principles are demonstrated by practice. For example, an organization that has a high rate of accidents and illness may claim that its values are health and safety, but applying POSIWID shows that the organization's practices contradict those values.

From a cybernetic perspective, complex systems are not controllable by simple notions of management, and interventions in a system can best be understood by looking at how they affect observed system behaviour. The term is used in many other fields as well, including biology, behavioral psychology, and management. Whereas a cybernetician may apply the principle to the results inexorably produced by the mechanical dynamics of an activity system, a management scientist may apply it to the results produced by the self-interest of actors who play roles in a business or other institution.

== Examples ==
In Heart of Enterprise, Beer gives examples from his own life as applications of the heuristic:

- Beer deals with a car company that has a system for provisioning spare parts by moving them between repair shops. Beer finds the process to be a slow one, with his car breaking down in other ways, requiring other parts, before his local garage can effect repairs. He speculates that from the company's perspective this may be a system intended to minimise the capital tied up in spare parts, but from Beer's perspective as a customer it is a system for not supplying spare parts.
- Beer observes that his home in west Wales is forty miles (65 km) from a mainline railway station, and that the small diesel train he must catch is noisy with tourists and has no smoking carriage. He concludes that the purpose of the railway network is to discourage him from travelling by rail, and the purpose of the diesel train is to prevent him from working or smoking on his journey.

He acknowledges that these examples, though they may be absurd, support the idea that "purpose is imputed to a system by its observer".

== See also ==
- Duck test ("if it looks like a duck...")
- Emergence
- Form follows function
- Functionalism–intentionalism debate
- Noble lie
- Prefigurative politics
- Teleology
- Systemantics
