= Sigma (operations research) =

Former operational research company

- Type: Private company
- Industry: Management consulting
- Founded: 1961
- Founders: Henry Novy, Stafford Beer and Roger Eddison
- Defunct: 1966
- Fate: Amalgamated with Martech and Proplan
- Successor: Metra Consulting Group
- Headquarters: London, United Kingdom
- Area served: Worldwide
- Key people: Stafford Beer
- Products: Operational research consultancy

Sigma (Science in General Management) was a limited company established by Henry Novy, Stafford Beer and Roger Eddison in 1961. It sold operational research (OR) in the United Kingdom and overseas. Beer was responsible for the cybernetic models of organisation and corporate planning which were the firm's specialty. Eddison was the operations director. It soon became the first substantial Operations Research consultancy firm in the UK. By the time Stafford Beer left in 1966 it employed 50 people.

== History ==
The consultancy arose following discussions between the Société d'Économie et de Mathématiques Appliquées (SEMA) and Martech Consultants Limited. Novy, who ran Maretch, was given the job of selecting the people to run the company, inviting several OR practitioners to come to Paris for an interview. After he selected Beer, Beer only agreed if Eddison would also join him. This was arranged and the company was launched with a reception at the Connaught Hotel in October 1961.

Over the next five years Sigma developed into a substantial organisation providing services to several leading companies across the UK as well as for six government departments. It also took on contracts in the United States and several developing countries. Amongst the diverse areas it worked in were energy, for the Gas Council, transportation, for British Rail and the Port of London Authority, shipbuilding, for the Geddes Committee, education for Yugoslavia, tourism, for Israel, nationalised industry in South America, and distribution for a variety of industrial firms.

In 1966, Sigma, Martech, and Proplan were amalgamated to form what afterwards became the Metra Consulting Group in the United Kingdom.
