= Allenna Leonard =

American cyberneticist

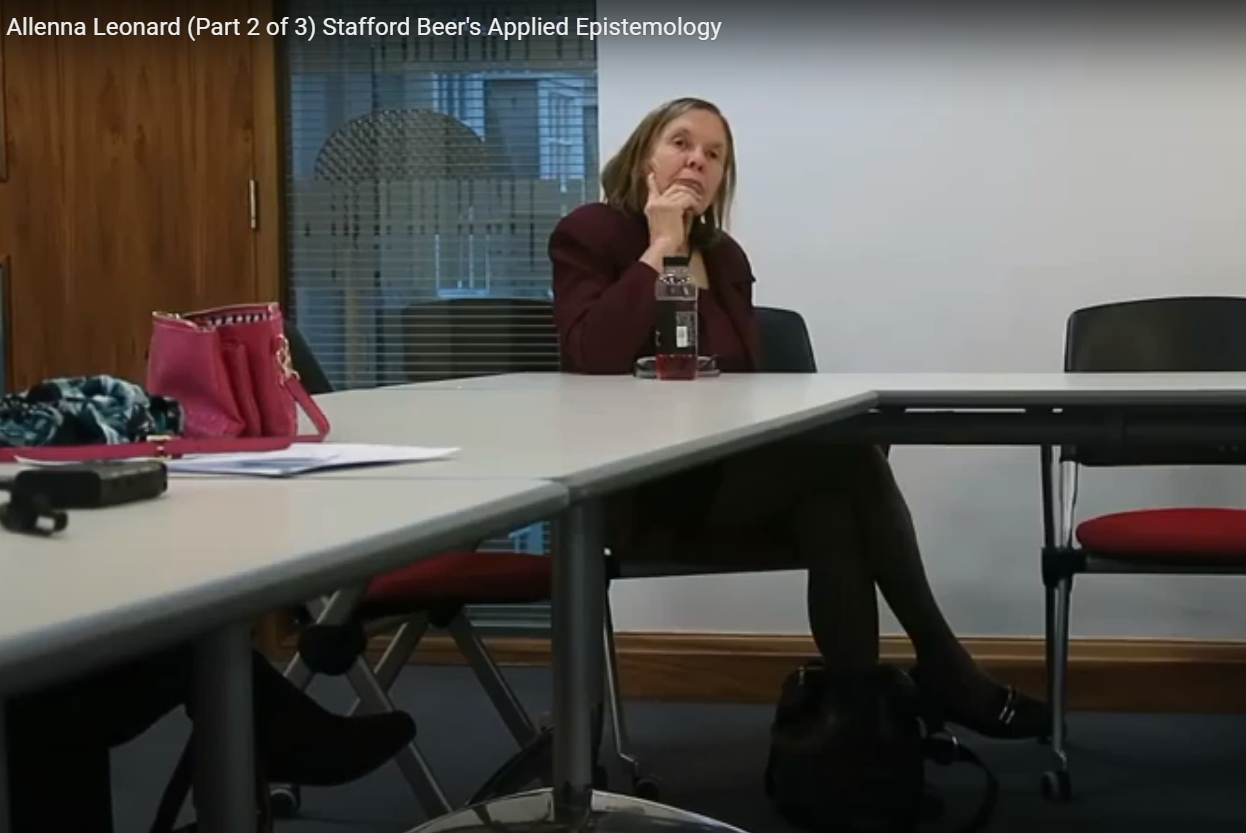
Allenna Leonard at "Stafford Beer’s Fifty Years of Applied Epistemology Or, what else besides the VSM?" meeting at Hull University Centre for Systems Studies, 2015

Allenna Leonard is an American cybernetician, consultant and director of Team Syntegrity International, specializing in the application of Stafford Beer's Viable System Model and Syntegration. She was president of the American Society for Cybernetics (ASC) from 2002 to 2004 and president of the International Society for the Systems Sciences in 2009–2010, and led the organization of its 54th annual meeting in Waterloo, Canada. Leonard is president of Metaphorum since 2022.

== Biography ==
She received a B.A. Classic liberal arts curriculum from the St. John's College in Annapolis, Maryland, a M.A. in Higher Education Administration from the George Washington University in Washington, D.C., and a Ph.D. from the University of Maryland, College Park, in administration with a concentration in cybernetics.

Leonard is a consultant under the auspices of The Complementary Set, especially applications of the Viable System Model, a part-time University Teacher, Licensee T.S.I. and a representative of the Cwarel Isaf Institute. Currently she is the Director of Team Syntegrity Inc. in Toronto, Ontario, Canada. She was president of the American Society for Cybernetics from 2002 to 2004, and was elected president for 2009–2010 of the International Society for the Systems Sciences.

Allenna Leonard was Stafford Beer’s partner in life and at work from 1981 until his death in 2002. She states on her web page that she is committed to continuing to use and publicize his work, and that her special interest is using Syntegration as a forum for democratic dialogue, especially on issues of public importance.

== See also ==
- Variety (cybernetics)
- Viable System Model

== Publications ==
Allenna Leonard has published several works on cybernetics and the work of Stafford Beer. A selection:

- — (1994). Roger Harnden (ed.). How many grapes went into the wine : Stafford Beer on the art and science of holistic management. New York: Wiley.
- with Stafford Beer (2001). The Systems Perspective: Methods And Models For The Future.
- with Angela Espinosa (2006). Cybernetics and Public Administration.

Articles and papers, a selection:

- — (2004) [1990]. "Coming Concepts: The Cybernetic Glossary for new management" (PDF). Archived from the original (PDF) on 2006-09-08.
- with Beer, Stafford (1994). The Systems Perspective: Methods and Models for the Future (Report). AC/UNU Project.
- — (August 1999). "A Viable System Model: Consideration of Knowledge Management". Journal of Knowledge Management Practice.
- — (2002). "After the cataclysm: a systems analysis". openDemocracy Ltd. Archived from the original on 2008-07-24.
- — (2003). "Mirror reflections: fundamentalism and the market economy". openDemocracy Ltd.
- — (October 2006). "A comparison of the Viable System Model and Seven Models of Risk with the effects of the Sarbanes-Oxley legislation". Journal of Organisational Transformation and Social Change. 3 (1).
- — (2007). "Clues from a clownfish: ten ideas for a better world". openDemocracy Ltd.
