= The Dream of Reality =

Book by Lynn Segal

- First edition cover
- Author: Lynn Segal
- Language: English
- Subject: Heinz von Foerster, Constructivist epistemology
- Genre: Philosophy
- Publisher: WW Norton
- Publication date: 1986
- Publication place: United States
- ISBN: 0393700267
- OCLC: 13005603
- LC Class: BD161 .S39 1986
- Website: http://lynnsegal.com/book_dream.html

The Dream of Reality: Heinz von Foerster's Constructivism is a book by Lynn Segal first published in 1986. Segal, a licensed clinical social worker, examines the constructivist epistemology of physicist and philosopher Heinz von Foerster. Originally intended as a transcription of von Foerster's lectures, the book evolved into Segal's interpretation of von Foerster's constructivism written in everyday language.

== Synopsis ==
The book begins with a foreword by Paul Watzlawick, a preface by the author, and an introduction which provides a synopsis of the book's content and structure. In chapter one, The Myth of Objectivity, Segal introduces the objectivity vs. constructivist epistemology debate, illustrated with examples of making sense of undifferentiated sensory input and eigenvalue puzzles, where the observer is necessary. In chapter two, The Difficulties of Language, the author describes what we can learn about epistemology from syllogisms, paradox, self-reference, and causality, finally focusing on the circular causality described in cybernetics. In the third chapter, Maturana and the Observer, Segal reviews Humberto Maturana's "observer-based science" where the object observed is not assumed to exist independent of the observer. The Nervous System is the next chapter, where Segal surveys the historical theories connecting perception and thought, including theories by Aristotle, Alkmaeon, Hippocrates, Galen, William Harvey, René Descartes, and Santiago Ramón y Cajal. In this chapter the author also looks at the evolution, structure, and function, of the nervous system and its relationship to the endocrine system. The fifth chapter, Computation, examines how computation happens in both computers and brains, using formal logic and trivial and non-trivial logical machines as conceptual tools to distinguish the two. Humans have capacity to "compute" in additional domains beyond mathematical-logical, including sensory and semantic domains. In chapter six, Biocomputation, Segal looks at how neural circuits work to calculate Boolean operations, and how these circuits fire in the presence of different but ignore sameness. In the final chapter, Closure, the author looks at closure across thermodynamics, mathematics, systems theory, and autopoesis. Segal goes on to examine the double closure of the nervous system along its sensorimotor and synapitc-endocrine dimensions. He returns to mathematics to examine recursion theory, cognition, and solipsism. The book ends with an interview with Heinz von Foerster conducted by media studies professor Carol Wilder.

== Publication ==
The first edition of the book was published in 1986 by W. W. Norton. A second edition of the book was published in 2001 by Springer with some corrections from von Foerster.

== Reception ==
The book received both mixed and positive reviews from the mental health and academic communities. Psychiatrist Peter Bruggen, reviewing the book for the Journal of Family Therapy, notes that Segal's discussions around paradox, reality, and the role of the observer are easier to follow than other writers such as Bateson and Maturana, even if Segal's logic is difficult to follow at times. Writing for Contemporary Psychology, David E. Presti questions Segal's application of neuroscience principles to questions of epistemology, while Klaus Krippendorff reviewing for the Journal of Communication praises Segal's ability to clearly present von Foerster's ideas, even if the book doesn't explore counterarguments. Linda Ade-Ridder writes in her review for Family Relations, "Written for anyone interested in exploring the concepts of objectivity and reality, this concise volume translates the ideas behind radical constructivism into a very readable form. Therapists will find the ideas particularly thought-provoking through the exploration of how language and logic shape thinking, especially within psychotheraputic models." In The Australian and New Zealand Journal of Family Therapy, psychiatrist Bill McLeod describes the book as "difficult but rewarding."
