= John J. Ford (CIA) =

John J. Ford (1923 – 27 July 1993) was an American CIA official, specializing in the study of soviet cybernetics, Executive Director of the American Society for Cybernetics, and Lecturer on Societal Cybernetics at the American University.

Ford was born in Pittsburgh in 1923. He served in the United States Navy during World War II. He afterwards moved to Washington and attended the Catholic University of America.

In 1951, Ford was employed by the CIA as chief of cybernetics and behavioral sciences research, Through his study of Soviet cybernetics in the 1950s, Ford was invited to the house of Secretary of Defense Robert S. McNamara on 15 October 1962, to give an informal presentation on "the serious threat to the United States and Western Society posed by increasing Soviet commitment to a fundamentally cybernetic strategy in the construction of communism" to several high-ranking governmental officials, including Robert F. Kennedy. This presentation went positively, until it was interrupted by news of Soviet missiles in Cuba.

Ford married twice, first to Jacqueline Ford, who died in 1983, and then to Judy Ford. Five of his children survived him.
