= American Society for Cybernetics =

Organization that advances cybernetics as a science

American Society for Cybernetics (ASC)
- Founded: 1964
- Founders: John J. Ford (CIA), Paul S. Henshaw (AEC), Douglas E. Knight (IBM), Robert Livingston (scientist), Donald N. Michael, William C. Moore (lawyer), and Walter N. Munster.
- Type: Professional Organization
- Purpose: Cybernetics
- Location: Washington DC, United States (membership is now worldwide)
- Region served: USA, worldwide
- Method: Conferences, Publications, Website.
- Key people: Paul Pangaro (current president)
- Website: homepage

The American Society for Cybernetics (ASC) is an American non-profit scholastic organization for the advancement of cybernetics as a science, a discipline, a meta-discipline and the promotion of cybernetics as basis for an interdisciplinary discourse. The society does this by developing and applying cybernetics’ concepts which are presented and published via its conferences and peer-reviewed publications. As a meta-discipline, it creates bridges between disciplines, philosophies, sciences, and arts. The ASC is a full member of the International Federation for Systems Research (IFSR).

In order to do so it holds conferences and seminars, and maintains contacts with cyberneticians and organizations for cybernetics in other countries. Further activities of the ASC are:

- ASC Glossary on Cybernetics and Systems Theory
- Disciplinary Matrices in Cybernetics and Systems Science
- Wiener and McCulloch awards

In the 1980s ASC became a member of the International Federation for Systems Research, and in the 1990s supported the Principia Cybernetica Project.

The ASC has been maintaining an editorial column in the interdisciplinary Cybernetics and Human Knowing Journal since its first issue in 1992. Rodney Donaldson was the first ASC president to write for the column.

== Founding ==
The American Society for Cybernetics was founded in 1964 in Washington, DC to encourage new developments in cybernetics as an interdisciplinary field (with Warren McCulloch as first elected president of the ASC). The society was spearheaded by John J. Ford of the CIA to counter growing advancements from the USSR in computing and cybernetics research and development. According to Evgeny Morozov, it bought together a number of academics, policy makers, spies, and business people to meet this aim. Morozov also notes that international and national pressures during the late 1960s led to increased interest in cybernetics for policy makers and governmental officials as a way to minimise uncertainty domestically and on the world stage.

== Annual Cybernetics Symposia ==
=== First Annual Cybernetics Symposium ===
The First Annual Cybernetics Symposium of the ASC was held on 26–7 October 1967 at the National Bureau of Standards, Gaithersburg, Maryland. The theme was "Purposive Systems: The Edge of Knowledge." The following people made presentations:

- Saul Amarel: "Problems of representation in artificial intelligence"
- Nikolai Amosov: "Simulation of thinking processes"
- Herbert Anschütz: "Prospects for the development of the psychocybernetics of intelligent behavior"
- Yehoshua Bar-Hillel: "The future of man-machine languages"
- Alexander S. Fraser: "The evolution of purposive behavior"
- Ralph Gerard: "The neurophysiology of purposive behavior"
- Jerrier A. Haddad: "Hardware for purposive systems"
- David Hawkins: "The nature of purpose"
- Margaret Mead: "Cybernetics of Cybernetics"
- Emmanuel G. Mesthene: "How technology will shape the future"
- Talcott Parsons: "Facilitating technological innovation in society"
- Frederick Seitz: "The Challenge"
- Ivan Sutherland: "Facilitating the man-machine interface"

== ASC Presidents ==
- 2021-2026 Paul Pangaro
- 2014-2020 Michael Lissack
- 2009-2014 Ranulph Glanville
- 2005-2008 Louis Kauffman
- 2002-2004 Allenna Leonard
- 1999-2001 Pille Bunnell
- 1994-1998 Frank Galuszka
- 1992-1993 Rodney Donaldson
- 1989-1991 Fred Steier
- 1986-1988 Larry Richards
- 1984-1985 Jon Cunnyngham
- 1983-1984 Bill Reckmeyer
- 1980-1982 Stuart Umpleby
- 1978-1979 Barry Clemson
- 1976-1977 Mark Ozer
- 1975-1976 Herbert Robinson
- 1972-1974 Roy Hermann
- 1970-1971 Carl Hammer
- 1969-1970 Lawrence J. Fogel
- 1967-1968 Warren McCulloch

== Awards ==
The ASC restructured its awards in 2024. Alongside the Norbert Wiener Medal and the Warren McCulloch Award, the society awards the Margaret Mead Prize (established 2024), the Heinz von Foerster Award, and ASC Fellowships.

=== Norbert Wiener Medal ===
The Norbert Wiener Medal is awarded for high achievement in transdisciplinary research in cybernetics and systems. The front of the medal shows a bas-relief of Norbert Wiener, and the obverse is inscribed with the name of the recipient.

- 1968: Robert C. Wood
- 1968: Warren McCulloch
- 1969: Stephen Grossberg
- 1969: Stuart A. Kauffman
- 1970: Stafford Beer
- 1972: Natalia Bechtereva
- 1983: Heinz von Foerster
- 1984: Gordon Pask
- 1993: Herbert Brün
- 2001: Klaus Krippendorff
- 2005: Ernst von Glasersfeld
- 2007: Charles François
- 2007: Laurence Richards
- 2007: Pille Bunnell
- 2007: Stuart Umpleby
- 2008: Francisco Varela
- 2008: Humberto Maturana
- 2008: Lars Löfgren
- 2008: Ricardo Uribe
- 2008: Richard Jung
- 2011: Mary Catherine Bateson
- 2011: Robert Vallée
- 2014: Louis H. Kauffman
- 2015: Ranulph Glanville
- 2016: William J. Reckmeyer
- 2018: Paul Weston
- 2019: Fred Steier
- 2024: Michael Arbib
- 2024: Raul Espejo
- 2026: Jude Lombardi

=== Warren McCulloch Award ===
The Warren McCulloch Award recognises significant impact in the community, whether externally by applying cybernetic methods and principles in real-world applications, or internally through service to the ASC itself. Prior to 2024 it was awarded to "young scientists", a role since filled by the Heinz von Foerster Award.

- 1984: Gregory Bateson
- 1986: Humberto Maturana
- 1993: Louis Kauffman
- 2008: Søren Brier
- 2008: Alexander Riegler
- 2011: Thomas Fischer
- 2012: Susan Parenti
- 2013: Bernard Scott
- 2013: Heinz von Foerster Society
- 2014: Allenna Leonard
- 2014: Jennifer Wilby
- 2014: Paul Pangaro
- 2014: Randall Whitaker
- 2016: Julia Frazer and John H. Frazer
- 2019: Mark Enslin
- 2024: Roy Ascott
- 2024: Jasia Reichardt
