= Dualism (cybernetics) =

Matter-information dualism

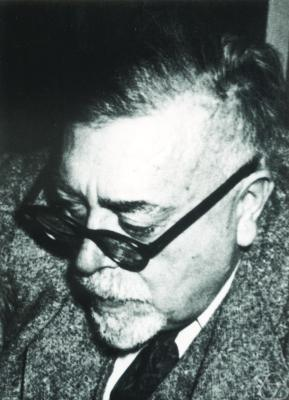
Norbert Wiener, the founder of cybernetics.

Dualism in cybernetics is the idea by Norbert Wiener, one of the founding fathers of cybernetics, that there exists a fundamental division between information and matter or energy.

== Background ==
Dualism in cybernetics emerged from the notion that there is another form of dualism besides the classical mind-matter dualism and this is the form-matter variant first proposed by the philosopher Anaxagoras and further developed by Plato and Aristotle. Norbert Wiener, the founder of cybernetics, used this as the basis of his position that information is a different reality from matter and energy. In the foundational discipline of cybernetics that he developed, Wiener also drew from the Cartesian dualism, which differentiated non-cognitive body and non-extended/disembodied mind. He outlined a dualism that opposed matter/energy with information and proposed that it is possible for the living and non-living to be within the same wall that once divided them.

Gregory Bateson contributed to the development of this notion of dualism through his theory of mind, which proposed that the mind extends the boundaries of the brain and body so that it is able to take multiple feedback loops, which then creates the link between organisms and the rest of the natural world. The key element here is the concept of feedback, which allows the identification of causal loops so that a system can change its behavior and receive information back from the environment concerning the external changes resulting from that changed behavior, using it as a basis for future actions. This cybernetic idea challenged the traditional subject/object dualism.
