= Liliane Atlan =

French playwright (1932–2011)

- Born: 14 January 1932; Monteplier, France
- Died: 15 February 2011 (aged 79); Kfar Saba, Israel
- Citizenship: Israel
- Known for: Author and playwright who explored the psychological effects of the Holocaust
- Spouse: Henri Atlan
- Children: 2
- Parent(s): Elie and Margeurite Cohen

Liliane Atlan (14 January 1932 – 15 February 2011) was a French Jewish writer whose work often focused on the psychological effects of the Holocaust.

== Life ==
Atlan was born Liliane Cohen in Montpellier, southern France, in 1932, to parents Elie and Marguerite Cohen. Elie had been born in Thessaloniki, Greece, in 1907 and immigrated to France with his parents as a child; Marguerite was from Marseilles, born in 1905. Liliane was the second of the couple's five daughters. In 1939, she and her sisters were sent into hiding in Auvergne and Lyon to avoid anti-Semitic persecution. In this isolated atmosphere, she and her older sister began to perform plays of their own creation to amuse themselves. The sisters were reunited with their parents in 1945 after the end of the Occupation, where they learned that their maternal grandmother and their mother's brothers had all been killed in the Holocaust.

After the war, Elie Cohen became focused on assisting survivors of the Holocaust, which included adopting a young male survivor into the family. The young man, Bernard Kruhl, was the sole member of his family to survive Auschwitz, and was starving himself to death in his grief. This adopted brother would confide his experiences in the concentration camps to his younger sister Liliane. These stories, newsreels portraying the camps, and the general stress of experiencing adolescence post-Holocaust, had a traumatic effect on the 14-year-old, and she developed anorexia, which she sought treatment for in a clinic in Switzerland.

Later, she studied Jewish texts at the Gilbert Bloch d'Orsay School in Paris. Here she met Henri Atlan, who she would later marry. She also studied philosophy at the Sorbonne from 1952 to 1953, where her thesis on “The Arbitrary and the Fantastic Since Nietzsche” was advised by Gaston Bachelard. In 1952 she also married Atlan, and they moved to Paris, having a daughter, Miri, in 1953 and a son, Michaël, in 1956. In the 1960s the family moved to Israel for several years. She also spent two years in California teaching French, and was a writer-in-residence at the University of Iowa in Iowa City before returning to Paris.

Atlan died of cancer on 15 February 2011 in Kfar Saba, Israel.

== Work ==
Atlan's work often explores the psychological effects of the Holocaust on the Jewish people, both collectively and individually, and draws from Jewish spirituality and culture for its structure and themes. Productions of her works, especially Un Opera pour Terezín, often employ non-traditional performance elements, such as using the audience as actors, and staging simultaneous performances worldwide, with audience interaction enabled by simultaneous video broadcasts and electronic communication methods. She refers to the multimedia format of these works as le rencontre en étoile or 'the star-shaped meeting.' Scholar Bettina Knapp coined the phrase 'cosmic theater' to describe Atlan's work, and its propensity to be rooted in a historical moment or a personal experience, but to "transcend limitation, each work passing from an individual plane to a collective or mythic realm" (Knapp, p. 133).

Her play Monsieur Fugue draws on French playwright Antonin Artaud's concept of a theater of cruelty. A band of four child ghetto survivors is being transported to Auschwitz where they will be murdered. During their trip, the children enact the lives they could have lived if they were to survive. Grol, one of the guards, decides to ride with the children, encouraging their storytelling and ultimately sharing their fate.

She was the recipient of many literary awards: the Habimah and the Mordechai Anielewicz prizes for her play Monsieur Fugue in 1972; a prize from WIZO for her novel Les Passants; and the Prix Mémoire de la Shoah in 1999 for a collection of her works.

=== Theater ===
- Monsieur Fugue (1967) - dir. Roland Monod - based in part on the story of Janusz Korczak
- Les Messies (1969) - dir. Roland Monod
- La Petite Voiture de flammes et de voix (1975) - dir. Michel Hermon
- Un opéra pour Terezín (1989) - dir. Christine Bernard-Sugy (broadcast via radio for France Culture) - depicts the fate of Jewish artists trapped in the Theresienstadt concentration camp; follows the structure of a Passover Seder

=== Poetry ===
- Les Mains coupeuses de mémoire (1961) - published under the pen name 'Galil'
- Maître-mur (1962)
- Lapsus (1971)

=== Prose ===
- Les Passants/The Passersby (1988, published in English in 1993) - a novel drawing on Atlan's experiences with anorexia and her study of Kabbalah
