= Ian Beer (rugby union) =

English rugby union player

- Full name: Ian David Stafford Beer
- Born: 28 April 1931 (age 95) Croydon, England
- School: Whitgift School
- University: University of Cambridge
- Notable relative: Stafford Beer (brother)
- Occupation: Schoolmaster

Rugby union career
- Position: Back-row
International career
Years	Team	Apps	(Points)
1955	England	2	(3)

Ian David Stafford Beer CBE (born 28 April 1931) is an English former international rugby union player and schoolmaster.

Born in Croydon, Beer is the younger brother of academic Stafford Beer and attended Whitgift School, where he learned his rugby, before studying for a zoology degree at St Catharine's College, Cambridge.

Beer, a back-row forward, gained three Cambridge blues and captained them to victory in the 1954 Varsity Match. He also captained a combined Oxford-Cambridge side on a 1954 tour of North America. Capped twice, Beer played as a number eight for England in the 1955 Five Nations, debuting against France at Twickenham. In his second match, Beer scored the decisive try to prevent Scotland from securing the triple crown. He played for Harlequins until being appointed to a teaching position at Marlborough College in Wiltshire, after which he played for Bath.

Beer was appointed headmaster of Ellesmere College at 29 and remained in the role through the 1960s. He then took over as Lancing College headmaster and, in 1981, replaced Michael Hoban as headmaster of Harrow School. After retiring in 1991, Beer had a term as Rugby Football Union president, serving from 1993 to 1994.

== See also ==
- List of England national rugby union players
