= Eilhard von Domarus =

American psychiatrist

Eilhard von Domarus (1893 – 1958) was a German-born American psychiatrist. He played an important role in the development of the interdisciplinary study of philosophy and neurology. Warren McCulloch regarded him as the “great philosophic student of psychiatry.”
