= Encyclopedia of Cybernetics =

Ukrainian language encyclopedia of computer science

The Encyclopedia of Cybernetics (Ukrainian: Енциклопедія кібернетики) is a Ukrainian language encyclopedia of computer science first published in Kyiv in 1973, with Victor Glushkov serving as its chief editor. The encyclopedia comprises two volumes containing over 1700 articles, primarily on topics in theoretical computer science, systems science, information theory, optimization and control theory. The articles were composed by some 600 scientists from various disciplines, affiliated with 102 educational and industrial institutions located throughout the Soviet Union. In 1974 the encyclopedia was translated into Russian.

== Authors ==
About 600 scientists and specialists in various fields of knowledge from 102 scientific and industrial institutions of the Soviet Union took part in the creation of encyclopedia. Among them are such well-known scientists as:

- Alexey Ivakhnenko
- Anatoliy Skorokhod
- Kateryna Yuschenko
- Eduard Skorokhodko

== See also ==
- International Encyclopedia of Systems and Cybernetics
- Ukrainian Soviet Encyclopedia
- Science and technology in Ukraine

== Links ==
- cyberua.info/novyny/persha-encyklopedija-kibernetyky-2t-ukr-red-vhlushkov-1973/ online (accessed 26.04.2016) (in Ukrainian)
- Myroslav Kratko The creation of the Ukrainian-language Encyclopedia of Cybernetics, www.istpravda.com.ua/digest/2011/02/7/22204/view_print/ online (accessed 26.04.2016) (in Ukrainian)
