= Lockheed Martin Orincon =

Lockheed Martin Orincon Corp.
- Company type: Private (sub. Lockheed Martin)
- Industry: Defense
- Founded: San Diego (1973)
- Headquarters: San Diego, California
- Key people: Dr. Daniel Alspach, Co-founder; Dr. Harold Sorenson, Co-founder; Dr. Jim Meditch, Co-founder
- Revenue: $52 million USD (2003)
- Number of employees: 250 (2003)
- Website: www.orincon.com

Lockheed Martin Orincon Corporation (originally ORINCON Corporation International) is a systems integration and information technology company that supports Lockheed Martin's position in the Intelligence, Surveillance, and Reconnaissance (ISR) industry.

== History ==
Orincon was established in 1973 in San Diego by University of California, San Diego professors Dr. Daniel Alspach and Dr. Harold Sorenson, and UC Irvine professor Dr. Jim Meditch. Operations began in 1975 with three government contracts.

During the Cold War, Orincon helped design the SOSUS tracker system to follow the Soviet Ballistic Missile Submarine. Convinced of the significance of SOSUS, Alspach wrote, "I see this as part of the chain that ended the Cold War. The SOSUS was so successful, that the Russians had to spend tremendous amounts of money trying to quiet their subs to avoid detection. At the same time, they spent a great deal trying to counter U.S. President Ronald Reagan's Star Wars technology. This, with the inherent inefficiencies of their socialistic economic system, broke the bank and led to the collapse of the Soviet Union."

Indeed, Soviet spies John Anthony Walker and Jerry Alfred Whitworth in the U.S. Navy revealed to the Russians that their submarines were noisy, and thus, easily detectable. This knowledge led to the development of "quieting" technology that Russia later sold to China.

In 1990, Orincon's primary business was antisubmarine warfare; however, the U.S. Navy deprioritized antisubmarine warfare technology spending in anticipation of the end of the Soviet Union. Despite the hardship of transformation in the 1990s, Orincon grew by 25 percent in 1998. In fact, until Lockheed Martin acquired Orincon in June 2003, Orincon experienced growth every year since its inception. Orincon's customers have included, but are not limited to, the United States Navy, Department of Transportation, National Cancer Research Institute, and the Federal Aviation Administration.

Orincon developed the Intelligent Vehicle Sensor as part of its Airport Classification and Tracking System (ACATS). From 1990 to 1998, there were five fatal ground collisions on U.S. airport runways, and in 1996, there were 280 near misses. The sensor was installed at Long Beach Airport to track airplanes on the ground to avoid runway incursions.
