= Cybernetics and Human Knowing =

Cybernetics and Human Knowing: A Journal of Second Order Cybernetics, Autopoiesis & Cyber-Semiotics is a quarterly peer-reviewed academic journal covering autopoiesis, biosemiotics, cognition, complexity, cybersemiotics, hermeneutics, information theory, linguistics, second-order cybernetics, semiotics, and systems theory, among others. The journal was established in 1992 and is published by Imprint Academic with Søren Brier (Copenhagen Business School) as editor-in-chief.

The journal's inception was initially supported by the Danish Academy for Practical Philosophy and the American Society for Cybernetics (ASC) with contributing editors and funding (ASC). The journal usually contains six different sections: the issue editors' foreword, peer-reviewed articles, an expert column, an ASC column, book reviews, and a featured artist artworks. Occasionally the journal dedicates an issue to publish conference proceedings and special topics.
