= Roger Eddison =

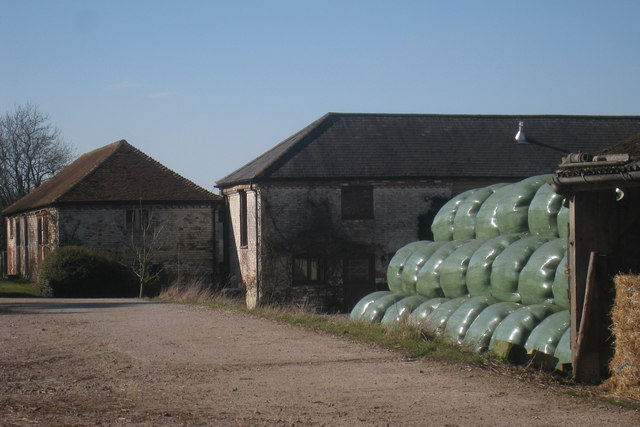
Horsted Pond Farm, where Eddison lived from 1953

Roger Tatham Eddison (16 September 1916, Yokohama – 2000) was an English practitioner of Operations Research. He was Joint Editor of Operational Research Quarterly from 1950 to 1958. He was President of the Operational Research Society 1966-1967.

== Early life ==
Eddison was born in Yokohama, the youngest of four sons, the twins Robert and Talbot Leadam Eddison being born in 1908. However his father, Edwin Eddison, a civil engineer died when he was six months old, and his mother, Hilda Muriel Leadham returned to England with her young family by way of Canada. Although her family came from Leeds, she settled in Haywards Heath and Roger attended Charterhouse School followed by Pembroke College, Cambridge.

== Second World War ==
At the outbreak of the Second World War Eddison joined the Army and was commissioned in the Royal Artillery and was then sent to the Royal Military College of Science where he served as a Technical Officer. He attained the rank of Major and title Chief Inspector of Fuses. It was in this period he became interested in statistics. Following the Second World War, Eddison first went to the Rothamsted Experimental Station, where he worked as a statistician with Frank Yates.

== Head of OR at British Iron and Steel Research Association ==
However, in 1948 when he saw an advert for a job in the Operation Research Department of the British Iron and Steel Research Association (BISRA), he applied and Charles Goodeve offered him the job of running the place. One of their first tasks was to respond to concerns raised by the Ministry of Transport as regards delays to ships experienced at British ports. After successfully resolving these problems his team helped the Steel Company of Wales with general problems of ore handling. This led to the company creating its own OR department under Steve Cook. By now the BISRA team now had about sixteen staff, and focused on various studies of smaller steel companies that did not have their own department.

== Science in General Management ==
In 1961 he joined Stafford Beer in establishing SIGMA (Science in General Management), a management consultancy firm.

== Family life ==
Roger married Rosemary in 1941, with whom he had two sons and a daughter, Charles, Hugh and Sally. In 1953 he bought Horsted Pond Farm in Little Horsted. Here he grew hemp and raised a dairy herd and carried out experiments with his crops.
