= Julius F. Hecker =

Julius Frederick (Friedrich) Hecker (8 October 1881 – 28 April 1938) was a Russian American (of German origin) Christian minister, philosopher and sociologist who settled in Soviet Russia in the 1920s.

He was born in St. Petersburg, Russia but moved to the United States. Here he attended Baldwin Wallace College, graduating in 1910. He went on to Drew Theological Seminary, Madison, New Jersey. He then stated his intention to return to Russia to serve the Methodist Episcopal Church. Hecker served as a student pastor in the USA and, speaking fluent Russian, he became assistant pastor of the Peoples' English Home Church in New York handling the needs of the 75 Russian members. He knew Warren Sturgis McCulloch when the latter was a teenager.

During the First World War, Hecker served as secretary to the U. S. War Prisoners' Aid of the American YMCA in Austro-Hungary. Prior to the U. S. entering the war, Hecker was transferred to Geneva, to work with the World's Alliance collecting and printing Russian books for distribution to POW's in German and Austro-Hungarian prison camps. In view of the difficulties in locating such books, Hecker also wrote some books for the prisoners.

By the early 1920s Hecker was living near Arbat, Moscow (Arbat) at 39 Starokonyoushenny with the support of Bishop John Louis Nuelsen.Here he established a correspondence school and kept in contact with the leaders of the "Living Church" movement. As he became increasingly associated with this movement within the Russian Orthodox Church, Dr. George A. Simons, who was the Superintendent of the Methodist Episcopal Church Russia Mission in St. Petersburg, became more critical of Hecker however Bishop Nuelsen remained supportive. "Julius Hecker, as bright as he was, clearly was a thorn in the flesh of this entire matter. As a free-lance Methodist educator in Moscow with some support from Bishop Nuelsen, though not under appointment, he too gave the wrong face to the Methodist Episcopal relationship to the ''Living Church" movement. George A. Simons was unquestionably opposed to the movement and felt that relationships should be fostered with the traditional leaders of the Russian Orthodox Church."

At times Hecker worked at the Moscow Theological Academy, the Institute of Red Professors, VOKS, and looked after foreign guests for Intourist. He also taught at the English Language Technology Center. He repeatedly traveled to Great Britain and the USA to give lectures. He met in London with H.G. Wells, at the University of Oxford with Nikolai Berdyaev and at the University of Cincinnati with Earle Edward Euban. Later, Hecker was an associate member of the Institute of Philosophy of the Academy of Sciences in Moscow. He also corresponded with George Bernard Shaw and Rabindranath Tagore.

In February 1938 during the Great Purge, Hecker who had already been arrested once by Soviet authorities in 1928 but released, was once again arrested. Soon he was convicted of being an "American spy", sentenced to death and executed at the Kommunarka shooting ground. Hecker was rehabilitated in 1957.

== Works ==
- Russian sociology; a contribution to the history of sociological thought and theory, (1915) New York: Columbia University Press
- Religion under the Soviets, (1927) New York: Vanguard Press
- Moscow Dialogues; Discussions on Red Philosophy, (1933) London: Chapman and Hall
- Religion and communism: a study of religion and atheism in Soviet Russia, (1933) London: Chapman and Hall
- The communist answer to the world's needs : discussions in economic, political and social philosophy; a sequel to Moscow dialogues, (1935) London: Chapman and Hall
- Religion and a changing civilisation, (1935) London: John Lane
