= Warren Sturgis McCulloch =

American neurophysiologist and cybernetician (1898–1969)

- Born: November 16, 1898; Orange, New Jersey, U.S.
- Died: September 24, 1969 (aged 70); Cambridge, Massachusetts, U.S.
- Education: Yale University (BA); Columbia University (MA, MD)
- Known for: "A Logical Calculus of the Ideas Immanent in Nervous Activity" (1943); Artificial neural networks; Artificial neurons; McCulloch–Pitts neuron; Heterarchy
- Awards: Wiener Gold Medal (1968)
- Scientific career
- Fields: Cybernetics; Artificial intelligence; Neurophysiology; Biophysics; Computer Science
- Workplaces: Massachusetts Institute of Technology; Yale University; University of Illinois at Chicago
- Notable students: Stafford Beer

Warren Sturgis McCulloch (November 16, 1898 – September 24, 1969) was an American neurophysiologist and cybernetician known for his work on the foundation for certain brain theories and his contribution to the cybernetics movement. Along with Walter Pitts, McCulloch created computational models based on mathematical algorithms called threshold logic which split the inquiry into two distinct approaches, one approach focused on biological processes in the brain and the other focused on the application of neural networks to artificial intelligence.

== Biography ==
Warren Sturgis McCulloch was born in Orange, New Jersey, in 1898. His brother was a chemical engineer and Warren was originally planning to join the Christian ministry. As a teenager he was associated with the theologians Henry Sloane Coffin, Harry Emerson Fosdick, Herman Karl Wilhelm Kumm and Julian F. Hecker. He was also mentored by the Quaker Rufus Jones. He attended Haverford College then studied philosophy and psychology at Yale University, where he received a Bachelor of Arts degree in 1921. He continued to study psychology at Columbia and received a Master of Arts degree in 1923. Receiving his MD in 1927 from the Columbia University College of Physicians and Surgeons in New York, he undertook an internship at Bellevue Hospital, New York. Then he worked under Eilhard von Domarus at the Rockland State Hospital for the Insane. He returned to academia in 1934. He worked at the Laboratory for Neurophysiology at Yale University from 1934 to 1941.

In 1941 he moved to Chicago and joined the Department of Psychiatry at the University of Illinois at Chicago, where he was a professor of psychiatry, as well as the director of the Illinois Neuropsychiatric Institute until 1951. From 1952 he worked at the Massachusetts Institute of Technology in Cambridge, Massachusetts with Norbert Wiener. He was a founding member of the American Society for Cybernetics and its second president during 1967–1968. He was a mentor to the British operations research pioneer Stafford Beer.

McCulloch had a range of interests and talents. In addition to his scientific contributions he wrote poetry (sonnets), and he designed and engineered buildings and a dam at his farm in Old Lyme, Connecticut.

McCulloch married Ruth Metzger, known as 'Rook', in 1924 and they had three children. He died in Cambridge in 1969.

== Work ==
He is remembered for his work with Joannes Gregorius Dusser de Barenne from Yale and later with Walter Pitts from the University of Chicago. He provided the foundation for certain brain theories in a number of classic papers, including "A Logical Calculus of the Ideas Immanent in Nervous Activity" (1943) and "How We Know Universals: The Perception of Auditory and Visual Forms" (1947), both published in the Bulletin of Mathematical Biophysics. The former is "widely credited with being a seminal contribution to neural network theory, the theory of automata, the theory of computation, and cybernetics".

McCulloch was the chair of the set of Macy conferences dedicated to Cybernetics. These, greatly due to the diversity of the backgrounds of the participants McCulloch brought in, became the foundation for the field.

In Wiener's Cybernetics (1948), he recounted an event in the spring of 1947, when McCulloch designed a machine to allow the blind to read, by converting printed letters to tones. He designed it so that the tone is invariant for the same letter viewed under different angles. Gerhardt von Bonin saw the design, and immediately asked, " Is this a diagram of the fourth layer of the visual cortex of the brain?".

In his last days in 1960s, he worked on loops, oscillations and triadic relations with Moreno-Díaz; the reticular formation with Kilmer and dynamic models of memory with Da Fonseca. His work in the 1960s was summarized in a 1968 paper.

=== Neuroscience ===
He studied the excitation of the brain by strychnine neuronography, which was a method to map brain connections. Applying strychnine in one point of the brain causes excitations in different points of the brain. Bailey, Bonin, and McCulloch conducted a series of studies in the 1940s that identified connections in the brains of macaque and chimpanzee that are consistent with modern understanding of VOF.

=== Mathematical logic ===
In 1919 he began to work mainly on mathematical logic, and by 1923 he attempted to make a logic of transitive verbs. His goal in psychology is to invent a "psychon" or "least psychic event" that are binary atomic events with necessary causes, such that they can be combined to create complex logical propositions concerning their antecedents. He noticed in 1929 that these may correspond to the all-or-nothing firings of neurons in the brain.

In the 1943 paper, they described how memories can be formed by a neural network with loops in it, or alterable synapses. These then encode for sentences like "There was some x such that x was a ψ" or $(\exists x) (\psi x)$, and showed that looped neural networks can encode all first-order logic with equality and conversely, any looped neural networks is equivalent to a sentence in first-order logic with equality, thus showing that they are equivalent in logical expressiveness.

The 1943 paper describes neural networks operating over time, and logical universals -- "there exists" and "for all"—for spatial objects, such as geometric figures, was further developed in their 1947 paper.

He worked with Manuel Blum in studying how a neural network can be "logically stable", that is, can implement a Boolean function even if the activation thresholds of individual neurons are varied. They were inspired by the problem of how the brain can perform the same functions, such as breathing, under influence of caffeine or alcohol, which shifts the activation threshold over the entire brain.

He worked on triadic relations, an extension of the calculus of relations to handle relations that relates 3 objects, such as "A gives B to C" or "A perceives B to be C". He was convinced that such a logic is necessary for understanding brain activity.

=== How we know universals ===
In the 1947 paper How we know universals, they studied the problem of recognizing objects despite changes in representation. For example, recognizing a square under different viewing angles and lighting conditions, or recognizing a phoneme under different loudness and tones. That is, recognizing objects invariant under the action of some symmetry group. This problem was partly inspired by a practical problem in designing a machine for the blind to read (recounted in Wiener's Cybernetics, see before).

The paper proposed two solutions. The first is in computing an invariant by averaging over the symmetry group. Let the symmetry group be $G$ and the object to be recognized be $x$. Let a neural network implement a function $T$. Then, the group-invariant representation would be $\frac{1}{|G|}\sum_{g \in G} T(g x)$, the group-action average. The second solution is in a negative feedback circuit that drives a canonical representation. Consider the problem of recognizing whether an object is a square. The circuit moves the eye so that the "center of gravity of brightness" of the object is moved to the middle of the visual field. This then effectively converts each object into a canonical representation, which can then be compared with a representation in the brain.

=== Neural network modelling ===
In the 1943 paper McCulloch and Pitts attempted to demonstrate that a Turing machine program could be implemented in a finite network of formal neurons (in the event, the Turing Machine contains their model of the brain, but the converse is not true), that the neuron was the base logic unit of the brain. In the 1947 paper they offered approaches to designing "nervous nets" to recognize visual inputs despite changes in orientation or size.

From 1952 McCulloch worked at the Research Laboratory of Electronics at MIT, working primarily on neural network modelling. His team examined the visual system of the frog in consideration of McCulloch's 1947 paper, discovering that the eye provides the brain with information that is already, to a degree, organized and interpreted, instead of simply transmitting an image.

With Roberto Moreno-Díaz, he studied a formalized problem of memory. Given that neural networks can store memory by a pattern of oscillations in a circle, they studied the number of possible oscillation patterns that can be sustained by some neural network with $N$ neurons. This came out to be $K(N) = \binom{2^N}{k}\sum_{k=1}^{2^N-1} k!$ (Schnabel, 1966). Also, they proved a universality theorem, in that for each $N$, there exists a neural network (possibly with more than $N$ neurons) with $\log_2 K(N)$ binary inputs, such that, for any oscillation pattern realizable by some neural network with $N$ neurons, there exists a binary input for this universal network such that it exhibits the same pattern.

=== Control ===
McCulloch considered the problem of contradictory information and motives, which he called a "heterarchy" of motives, meaning that the motives are not linearly ordered, but can be ordered like $A > B > C > A$. He posited the concept of "poker chip" reticular formations as to how the brain deals with contradictory information in a democratic, somatotopical neural network. Specifically, how the brain can commit the animal to a single course of action when the situation is ambiguous.

They designed a prototypic example neural network "RETIC", with "12 anastomatically coupled modules stacked in columnar array", which can switch between unambiguous stable modes based on ambiguous inputs.

His principle of "Redundancy of Potential Command" was developed by von Foerster and Pask in their study of self-organization and by Pask in his Conversation Theory and Interactions of Actors Theory.

== Publications ==
McCulloch wrote a book and several articles:

- 1965, Embodiments of Mind. MIT Press, Cambridge,
- 1993, The Complete Works of Warren S. McCulloch. Intersystems Publications: Salinas, CA.

Articles, a selection:

- 1943, "A Logical Calculus of the Ideas Immanent in Nervous Activity". With Walter Pitts. In: Bulletin of Mathematical Biophysics Vol 5, pp 115–133.
- 1945, "A Heterarchy of Values Determined by the Topology of Nervous Nets". In: Bulletin of Mathematical Biophysics, 7, 1945, 89–93.
- 1959, "What The Frog's Eye Tells The Frog's Brain". With Jerome Lettvin, H.R. Maturana and W.H. Pitts. In: Proc. of the I. R. E. Vol 47 (11).
- 1969, "Recollections of the Many Sources of Cybernetics", published in: ASC FORUM Volume VI, Number 2 -Summer 1974.

Papers published by the Chicago Literary Club:

- 1945, "One Word After Another".
- 1959, "The Past of a Delusion".
- 1959, "The Natural Fit".

== See also ==
- Randolph diagram
