= Heinz von Foerster =

Austrian-American scientist and cybernetician (1911–2002)

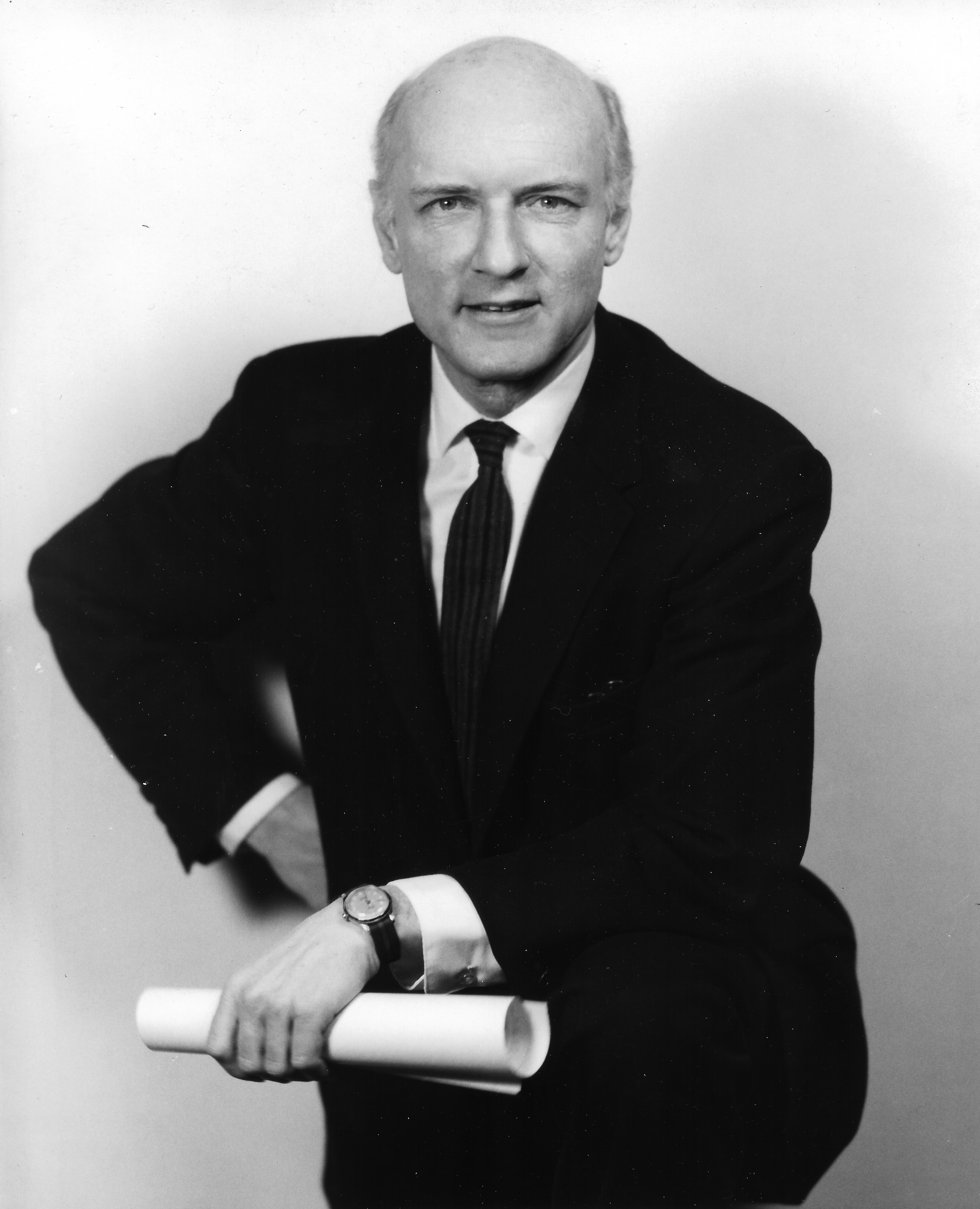
- At the Biological Computer Laboratory, the University of Illinois in 1963
- Born: Heinz von Förster; November 13, 1911; Vienna, Austria-Hungary
- Died: October 2, 2002 (aged 90); Pescadero, California, U.S.
- Education: Technical University of Vienna; University of Breslau
- Known for: Von Foerster equation Second-order cybernetics Computer science Artificial intelligence Epistemology; Biophysics
- Awards: Wiener Gold Medal (1983)
- Scientific career
- Fields: Cybernetics; Physics; Philosophy
- Workplaces: University of Illinois at Urbana–Champaign

Heinz von Foerster (né von Förster; November 13, 1911 – October 2, 2002) was an Austrian-American scientist combining physics and philosophy, and widely attributed as the originator of second-order cybernetics. He was twice a Guggenheim fellow (1956–57 and 1963–64) and also was a fellow of the American Association for the Advancement of Science, 1980. He is well known for his 1960 Doomsday equation formula published in Science predicting future population growth.

As a polymath, he wrote nearly two hundred professional papers, gaining renown in fields ranging from computer science and artificial intelligence to epistemology, and researched high-speed electronics and electro-optics switching devices as a physicist, and in biophysics, the study of memory and knowledge. He worked on cognition based on neurophysiology, mathematics, and philosophy and was called "one of the most consequential thinkers in the history of cybernetics". He came to the United States, and stayed after meeting with Warren Sturgis McCulloch, where he received funding from The Pentagon to establish the Biological Computer Laboratory, which built the first parallel computer, the Numa-Rete. Working with William Ross Ashby, one of the original Ratio Club members, and together with Warren McCulloch, Norbert Wiener, John von Neumann and Lawrence J. Fogel, Heinz von Foerster was an architect of cybernetics and one of the members of the Macy conferences, eventually becoming editor of its early proceedings alongside Hans-Lukas Teuber and Margaret Mead.

== Biography ==
Von Foerster was born in 1911 in Vienna, Austria-Hungary, as Heinz von Förster. His paternal grandfather was the Austrian architect Emil von Förster. His maternal grandmother was Marie Lang, an Austrian feminist, theosophist, and publisher. He studied physics at the Technical University of Vienna and at the University of Breslau, where in 1944 he received a PhD in physics. His younger brother was the Jazz musician Uzzi Förster and his relatives included Ludwig Wittgenstein, Erwin Lang and Hugo von Hofmannsthal. Ludwig Förster was his great-grandfather. His Jewish roots did not cause him much trouble while he worked in radar laboratories during the Nazi era, as "he hid his ancestry with the help of an employer who chose not to press him for documents on his family."

He moved to the US in 1949 and worked at the University of Illinois at Urbana–Champaign, where he was a professor of electrical engineering from 1951 to 1975. He was also professor of biophysics (1962–1975) and director of the Biological Computer Laboratory (1958–1975). Additionally, in 1956–57 and 1963–64, he was a Guggenheim Fellow and also President of the Wenner-Gren-Foundation for anthropological research from 1963 to 1965.

He knew well and was in conversation with John von Neumann, Norbert Wiener, Humberto Maturana, Francisco Varela, Gordon Pask, Gregory Bateson, Lawrence J. Fogel and Margaret Mead, among many others.

He died on October 2, 2002, in Pescadero, California.

== Work ==
Von Foerster worked in the field of cybernetics, and is known as the inventor of second-order cybernetics. He made important contributions to constructivism. Von Foerster was heavily influenced by the Vienna Circle and Ludwig Wittgenstein. He was also known for his interest in computer music and magic.

=== The electron tube laboratory ===
In 1949, von Foerster started work at the University of Illinois at Urbana–Champaign at the electron tube laboratory of the Electrical Engineering Department, where he succeeded Joseph Tykociński-Tykociner. He developed many innovative devices, including ultra-high-frequency electronics, with the assistance of his students.

Von Foerster also worked on mathematical models of population dynamics. In 1959, he published a model now called the "von Foerster equation", which is derivable from the principles of constant aging and conservation of mass:

$$\frac{\partial n}{\partial t} + \frac{\partial n}{\partial a}  = - m(a)n,$$

where: n = n(t,a), t stands for time and a for age. m(a) is the death in function of the population age; n(t,a) is the population density in function of age.

When m(a) = 0, we have:

$$\frac{\partial n}{\partial t} = - \frac{\partial n}{\partial a}$$

It relates that populations age, and that that fact is the only one that influences change in population density.

It is therefore a continuity equation. It can be solved using the method of characteristics; another way is by similarity solution; a third way is a numerical approach, such as finite differences.

The gross birth rate is given by the following boundary condition:

$$n(t,0)= \int_0^\infty b (a)n(t,a) \, dt ,$$

The solution is only unique given the initial conditions

$$n(0,a)= f(a), \,$$

which states that the initial population distribution must be given; then it will evolve according to the partial differential equation.

=== Biological Computer Laboratory ===
In 1958, von Foerster formed the Biological Computer Lab. The lab studied similarities in cybernetic systems as related to biology and electronics.

=== Macy conferences ===
He was the youngest member of the core group of the Macy conferences on Cybernetics and editor of the five volumes of Cybernetics (1949–1953), a series of conference transcripts that represent important foundational conversations in the field. It was von Foerster who suggested that Wiener's coinage "Cybernetics" be applied to this conference series, which had previously been called "Circular Causal and Feedback Mechanisms in Biological and Social Systems".

=== Doomsday equation ===
A 1960 issue of Science magazine included an article by von Foerster and his colleagues, P. M. Mora and L. W. Amiot, proposing an equation representing the best fit to the historical data on the Earth's population available in 1958:

Fifty years ago, Science published a study with the provocative title “Doomsday: Friday, 13 November, A.D. 2026”. It fitted world population during the previous two millennia with P = 179 × 10^{9}/(2026.9 − t)^{0.99}. This “quasi-hyperbolic” equation (hyperbolic having exponent 1.00 in the denominator) projected to infinite population in 2026—and to an imaginary one thereafter.

—Taagepera, Rein. A world population growth model: Interaction with Earth's carrying capacity and technology in limited space Technological Forecasting and Social Change, vol. 82, February 2014, pp. 34–41

The authors and the scientific community took the doomsday prediction at face value, not as a tongue-in-cheek parable.

The global population is equal to $\tfrac{179000000000}{2026.9 - t}$ and hyperbolically grows as t approaches 2026.9. When t surpasses 2026.9, the number of people living on the planet Earth suddenly becomes negative—on 13 November 2026 AD, all humans instantaneously disappear.

In 1975, von Hoerner suggested that von Foerster's doomsday equation can be written, without a significant loss of accuracy, in a simplified hyperbolic form (i.e. with the exponent in the denominator assumed to be 1.00):

$$\text{Global population}=\frac{179000000000}{2026.9 - t},$$

where

- 2026.9 is 13 November 2026 AD—the date of the so-called "demographic singularity" and von Foerster's 115th birthday;
- t is the number of a year of the Gregorian calendar.

Despite its simplicity, von Foerster's equation is very accurate in the range from 4,000,000 BP to 1997 AD. For example, the doomsday equation (developed in 1958, when the Earth's population was 2,911,249,671) predicts a population of 5,986,622,074 for the beginning of the year 1997:

$$\frac{179000000000}{2026.9 - 1997}=5986622074.$$

The actual figure was 5,924,787,816.

The doomsday equation is called so because it predicts that the number of people living on the planet Earth will become maximally positive by 13 November 2026, and on the next moment will become negative. Said otherwise, the equation predicts that on 13 November 2026 all humans will instantaneously disappear.

== See also ==
- Macy conferences
- Power law: The equation that he derived for the date calculated is one that nowadays is called a power law.
- List of dates predicted for apocalyptic events
- The Dream of Reality by Lynn Segal, 1986. A book summarizing von Foerster's constructivist epistemology.
- Malthusian growth model
- Jakob von Uexküll

== Publications ==
Von Foerster authored more than 100 publications. Books, a selection:

- 1949, Cybernetics: Transactions of the Sixth Conference, (editor), Josiah Macy Jr. Foundation: New York, 220 pp.
- 2002, Understanding understanding, a volume of von Foerster's papers, published by Springer-Verlag, 2002.
- 2010, with Monika Broecker: Part of the World. Fractals of Ethics – A Drama in Three Acts. Heinz von Foerster's most extensive biography. First published in German in 2002: with Monika Broecker. Teil der Welt. Fraktale einer Ethik – ein Drama in drei Akten.

Articles, a selection:

- 1958, "Basic Concepts of Homeostasis." In: Homeostatic Mechanisms, Upton, New York, pp. 216–242, 1958.
- 1960, "Doomsday: Friday, November 13, AD 2026," with P. M. Mora und L. W. Amiot, Science 132, pp. 1291–1295, 1960.
- 1961, "A Predictive Model for Self-Organizing Systems," Part I: Cybernetica 3, pp. 258–300; Part II: Cybernetica 4, pp. 20–55, with Gordon Pask, 1961.
- 1964, "Biological Computers," with W. Ross Ashby, In: Bioastronautics, K. E. Schaefer, Macmillan Co., New York, pp. 333– 360, 1964.
- 1969, "What is Memory that it may have Hindsight and Foresight"
- 1971, "Computing in the Semantic Domain"
- 1971, "Technology. What Will It Mean to Librarians?"
