= Stafford Beer =

British cyberneticist (1926–2002)

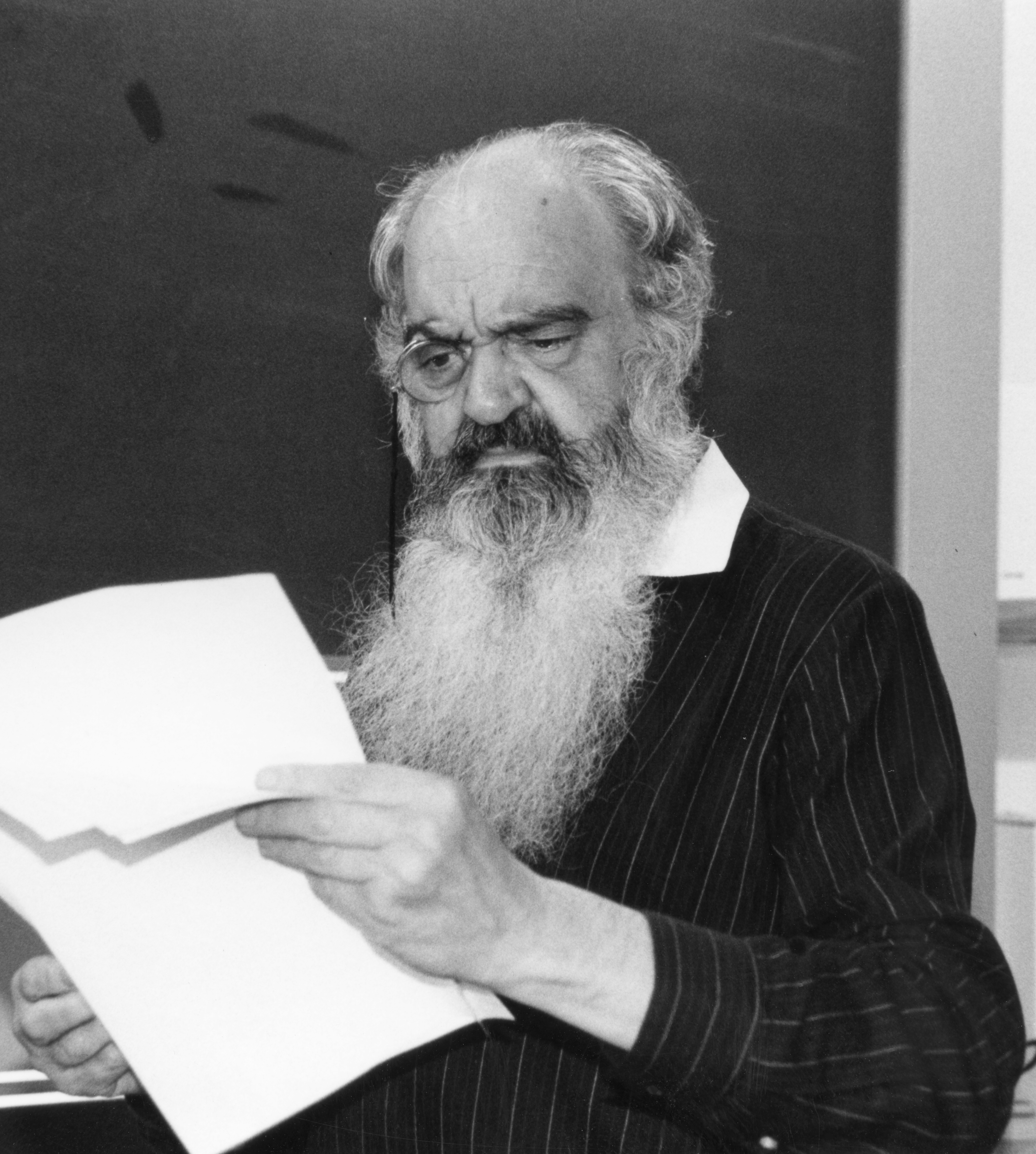
- Beer at the University of St. Gallen in 1990
- Born: Anthony Stafford Beer; 25 September 1926; Fulham, London, England
- Died: 23 August 2002 (aged 75); Toronto, Ontario, Canada
- Education: University of Sunderland (DSc)
- Occupations: Cyberneticist; operational researcher; consultant; theorist; professor
- Known for: Operational research; Management cybernetics; Project Cybersyn; "POSIWID"; Viable system model; Viable system theory; Syntegrity; Brain of the Firm (1972); Co-founder of Sigma
- Spouses: Cynthia Hannaway (m. 1947) Sallie Steadman (m. 1968)
- Partner: Allenna Leonard (1982–2002)
- Children: 7

Anthony Stafford Beer (25 September 1926 – 23 August 2002) was a British cyberneticist, management theorist and consultant, operational researcher and professor at Manchester Business School. He is known for his work in the fields of operational research and management cybernetics (the latter of which he founded), specifically in relation to Project Cybersyn, of which he was the principal architect. He is also known for his heuristic in systems thinking that "the purpose of a system is what it does".

== Biography ==
=== Early life ===
Anthony Stafford Beer was born in Fulham, London, on 25 September 1926. His father was William John Beer, chief statistician at Lloyd's Register of Shipping, who shared a birthday with Stafford's mother, Doris Ethel Beer. At the age of 17 Stafford was expelled from Whitgift School. He enrolled in philosophy at University College London before enlisting in the British Army as a gunner in the Royal Artillery in 1944, during the Second World War. He soon received commissions, first in the Royal Fusiliers, and then as a company commander in the 9th Gurkha Rifles. Beer served in the British Raj until 1947, when he returned to England and was assigned to the human factors branch of operational research at the War Office. In 1949 he was demobilised, having reached the rank of captain.

Beer did not use his given first name, "Anthony", instead preferring his middle name, "Stafford". His younger brother, Ian, also shared this middle name. When Ian was sixteen, Beer persuaded him to sign a document promising not to use "Stafford" as part of his name because Beer "wanted the ‘copyright’ of [the name] Stafford Beer."

=== United Steel ===
In 1956 he joined United Steel and persuaded the management to fund an operational research group, the Department of Operations Research and Cybernetics, which he headed. This was based in Cybor House, and they installed a Ferranti Pegasus computer, the first in the world dedicated to management cybernetics.

=== SIGMA ===
In 1961 he left United Steel to start an operational research consultancy in partnership with Roger Eddison called SIGMA (Science in General Management). Beer left SIGMA in 1966 to work for a SIGMA client, the International Publishing Corporation (IPC). He left IPC in 1970 to work as an independent consultant, focusing on his growing interest in social systems. His engagement in Latin America began in the 1960s through SIGMA, which worked on industrial optimisation projects in Chile and unsuccessfully explored expansion into other regional markets.

=== Cybersyn ===
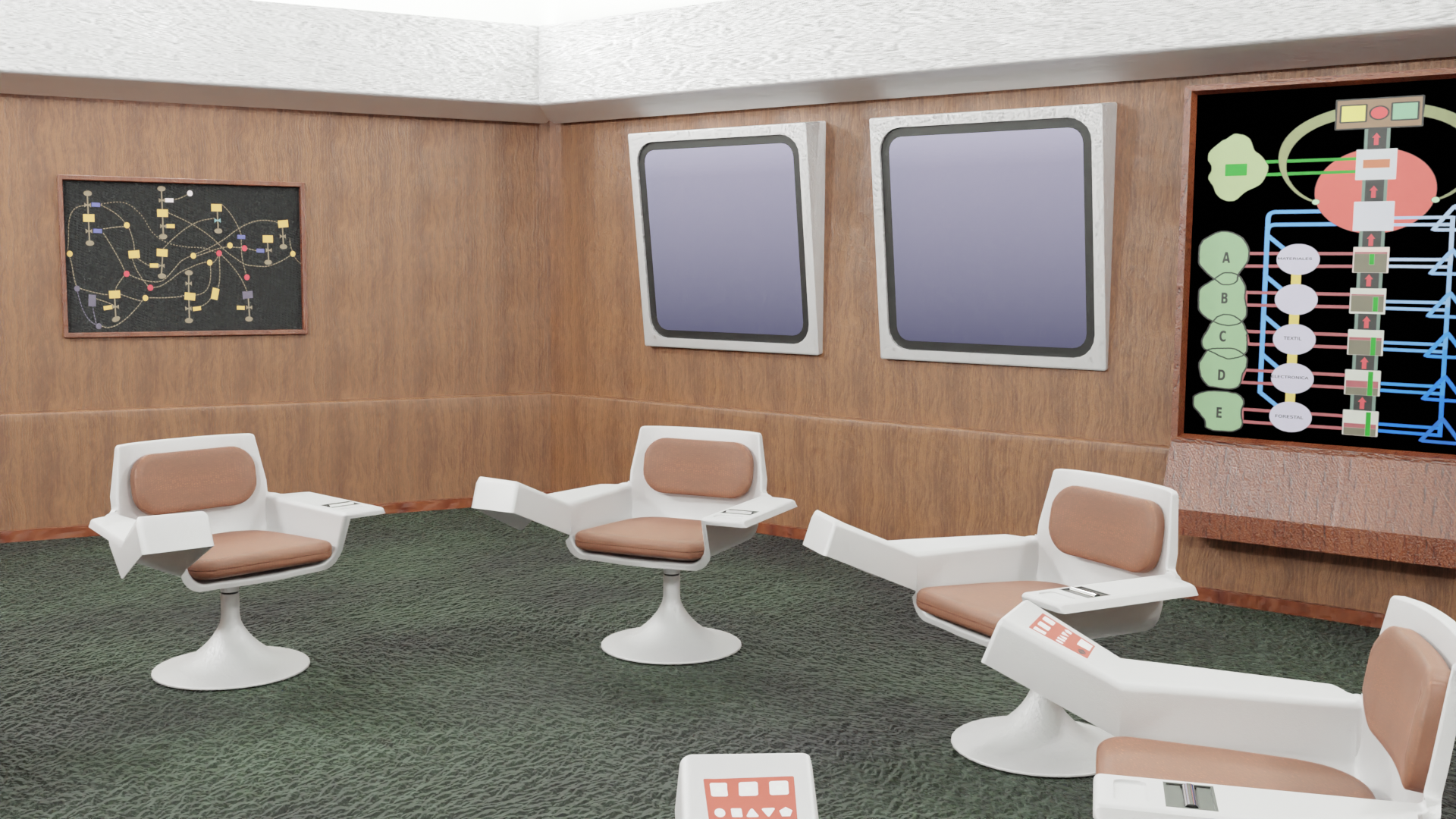
Project Cybersyn was an early form of computational economic planning.

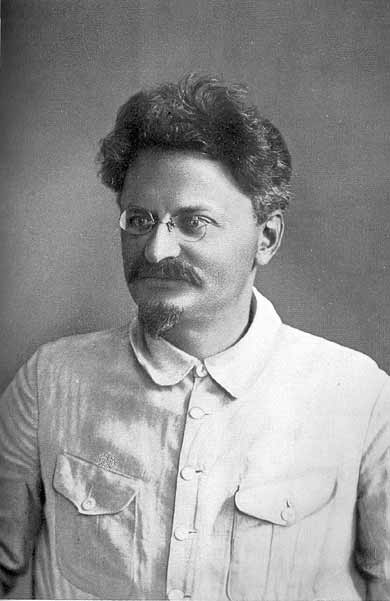
Leon Trotsky's critique of the Soviet Union influenced Beer’s shifting political views and the design of the Cybersyn model.

In mid-1971 Beer was approached by Fernando Flores, then a high-ranking member of the Chilean Production Development Corporation (CORFO) in the newly elected socialist government of Salvador Allende, for advice on applying his cybernetic theories to the management of the state-run sector of the Chilean economy.

This led to Beer's involvement in the never-completed Cybersyn project, which aimed to use computers and a telex-based communication network to allow the government to maximise production while preserving the autonomy of workers and lower management.

Beer also was reported to have read and been influenced by Leon Trotsky's critique of the Soviet bureaucracy. According to Herman Schwember (1939-2008), another senior member of the Cybersyn team, former Professor of Fluid Mechanics and Vice-Rector of the Catholic University of Chile, later exiled to London, Beer's political background and readings completely derived from works written by Trotsky and Trotskyists. Schwember himself disapproved of Trotsky's approach.

Although Cybersyn was abandoned after Allende's death during the Pinochet coup in 1973, Beer continued to work in the Americas, consulting for the governments of Canada, Mexico, Uruguay and Venezuela. Beer was particularly involved in the 1980s and 1990s on various governmental cybernetic projects, including Uruguay's successful URUCIB executive information system (1986–1988), Colombia's application of the Viable System Model to public sector reform (1990s–2000s) and unsuccessful ventures in Mexico and Venezuela that were undermined by corruption and political instability.

=== Later activity ===
In the mid-1970s he moved to Mid Wales, where he lived an almost austere lifestyle, developing strong interests in poetry and art. In the 1980s he established a second home on the west side of downtown Toronto. He was a visiting professor at almost 30 universities and received an earned higher doctorate (DSc) from the University of Sunderland and honorary doctorates from the University of Leeds, the University of St. Gallen and the University of Valladolid. He was president of the World Organization of Systems and Cybernetics.

=== Falcondale Collection ===
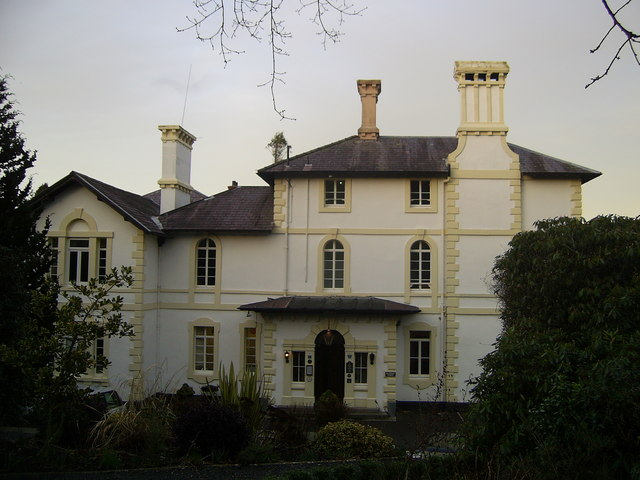
Falcondale House

In July 1994 Beer ran a residential course at Falcondale House in Lampeter. Nine sessions were recorded as a video learning resource, and are collectively known as the Falcondale collection. They are available online at the Data Repository of Liverpool John Moores University. The sessions covered art, science and philosophy as well as the practical application of cybernetics in society, government, community, management and business. Transcripts were made of the discussions and are also available from the same repository.

=== Family life ===
He was married twice, in 1947 to Cynthia Hannaway, and in 1968 to Sallie Steadman. His partner for the last twenty years of his life was Allenna Leonard, a fellow cybernetician. Beer had five sons and two daughters, one of whom is Vanilla Beer, an artist and writer.

== Work ==
Sketch for a cybernetic factory, 1959

=== Management cybernetics ===
According to Mike Jackson, a systems scientist, "Beer was the first to apply cybernetics to management, defining cybernetics as the science of effective organization". In the 1960s and early 1970s "Beer was a prolific writer and an influential practitioner" in management cybernetics. It was during that period that he developed the viable system model, to diagnose the faults in any existing organisational system. In that time Jay Wright Forrester invented systems dynamics, which "held out the promise that the behaviour of whole systems could be represented and understood through modelling the dynamical feedback process going on within them".

=== Cybersyn ===
Cybersyn operations room, 1972

During the presidency of Salvador Allende in Chile in the early 1970s, Beer was closely involved with a visionary project, Cybersyn, to apply his cybernetic theories in government. The project's ultimate goal was to create a network of computers and communications equipment that would support the management of the state-run sector of Chile's economy; at its core would be an operations room where government managers could view important information about economic processes in real time, formulate plans of action, and transmit advice and directives to managers at plants and enterprises in the field. However, its designers aimed to preserve worker and lower-management autonomy instead of implementing a top-down system of centralised control. The system used a network of about 500 telex machines located at enterprises throughout the country and in government offices in Santiago, some of which were connected to a government-operated mainframe computer that would receive information on production operations, feed that information into economic modelling software, and report on variables (such as raw material supplies) that were outside normal parameters and might require attention. The project, implemented by a multidisciplinary group of both Chileans and foreigners, reached an advanced prototype stage, but was interrupted by the 1973 coup d'état.

=== Viable System Model ===
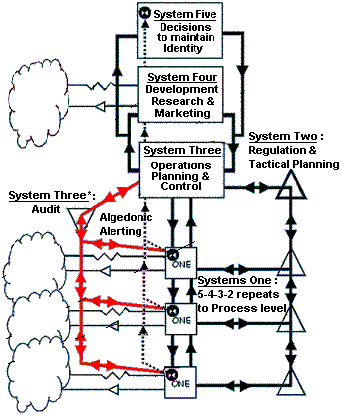
Principal functions of the Viable System Model, 1975.

The Viable System Model (VSM) is a model of the organisational structure of any viable or autonomous system. A viable system is any system organised in such a way as to meet the demands of surviving in the changing environment. One of the prime features of systems that survive is that they are adaptable. The VSM expresses a model for a viable system, which is an abstracted cybernetic description that is applicable to any organisation that is a viable system and capable of autonomy.

=== Syntegration and Team Syntegrity ===
Syntegrity is a formal model presented by Beer in the 1990s and now is a registered trademark. It is a form of non-hierarchical problem solving that can be used in a small team of 10 to 42 people. It is a business consultation product that is licensed out to consulting firms. The term comes from the words "synergistic" and "tensegrity".

=== POSIWID ===
Stafford Beer coined and frequently used the term POSIWID (the purpose of a system is what it does) to refer to the commonly observed phenomenon that the de facto purpose of a system is often at odds with its official purpose. In an address to the University of Valladolid in October 2001, he said "According to the cybernetician the purpose of a system is what it does. This is a basic dictum. It stands for bald fact, which makes a better starting point in seeking understanding than the familiar attributions of good intention, prejudices about expectations, moral judgment or sheer ignorance of circumstances." This principle has been used to describe Social Machines as intelligent, for example in the case of "games with a purpose", and it provides a link between AI and cybernetics.

== Awards ==
Beer received awards from the Royal Swedish Academy of Engineering Sciences in 1958, from the United Kingdom Systems Society, the Cybernetics Society, the American Society for Cybernetics and the Operations Research Society of America.

== Legacy ==
- The Stafford Beer Medal is awarded in recognition of the most outstanding contribution to the philosophy, theory or practice of Information Systems published in the European Journal of Information Systems (EJIS) within the relevant year.

== Bibliography ==
Beer wrote several books and articles:

- 1959, Cybernetics and Management, English Universities Press.
- 1966, Decision and Control, Wiley, London.
- 1968, Management Science: The business use of operations research, Aldus Books, London, Doubleday, New York.
- 1972, Brain Of The Firm, Allen Lane, The Penguin Press, London, Herder and Herder, USA.Translated into German, Italian, Swedish, French and Russian.
- 1974, Designing Freedom, CBC Learning Systems, Toronto, 1974; and John Wiley, London and New York, 1975. Translated into Spanish and Japanese.
- 1975, Platform for Change, John Wiley, London and New York. Reprinted with corrections 1978.
- 1977, Transit; Poems, CWRW Press, Wales. Limited Edition, Private Circulation.
- 1979, The Heart of Enterprise, John Wiley, London and New York. Reprinted with corrections 1988.
- 1981, Brain of the Firm; Second Edition (much extended), John Wiley, London and New York. Reprinted 1986, 1988. Translated into Russian.
- 1983, Transit; Poems, Second edition (much extended). With audio cassettes: Transit – Selected Readings, and one Person Metagame; Mitchell Communications, Publisher, 2693 Route 845, Carters Point, NB, Canada, E5S 1S2.
- 1985, Diagnosing the System for Organizations; John Wiley, London and New York. Translated into Italian and Japanese. Reprinted 1988, 1990, 1991.
- 1986, Pebbles to Computer: The Thread; (with Hans Blohm), Oxford University Press, Toronto.
- 1994, Beyond Dispute: The Invention of Team Syntegrity; John Wiley, Chichester.

Audio

- 1973, Stafford Beer. "Designing Freedom" The 1973 Massey Lectures RADIO CANADA INTERNATIONAL TRANSCRIPTION: E1121 "The Real Threat to all We Most Dear", E1122 "The Disregarded Tools of Modern Man", E1123, "A Liberty Machine in Prototype" E1124, "Science in The Service of Man" 1h 53:30.
- 1990, Stafford Beer, "Forty Years of Cybernetics", Gordon Hyde Memorial Lecture at the Cybernetics Society in London, January 1990 (audio file: 1hr 27mins).

Video

- 1990, Stafford Beer, The Intelligent Organization on YouTube Stafford Beer at Monterrey Tec, March 1990 illustrated by Javier Livas

== See also ==
- W. Ross Ashby
- Variety (cybernetics)

== Sources ==
- Pickering, Andrew (2004), "The Science of the Unknowable: Stafford Beer's Cybernetic Informatics", in Rayward, W. Boyd; Bowden, Mary Ellen (eds.), The History and Heritage of Scientific and Technological Information Systems, Medford, New Jersey: Information Today, Inc
