= An Introduction to Cybernetics =

1956 book by W. Ross Ashby

- Title page for An Introduction to Cybernetics (1956)
- Author: W. Ross Ashby
- Language: English
- Subject: Cybernetics
- Published: 1956
- Publisher: Chapman and Hall
- Publication place: England

An Introduction to Cybernetics is a book by W. Ross Ashby, first published in 1956 in London by Chapman and Hall. An Introduction is considered the first textbook on cybernetics, where the basic principles of the new field were first rigorously laid out. It was intended to serve as an elementary introduction to cybernetic principles of homeostasis, primarily for an audience of physiologists, psychologists, and sociologists. Ashby addressed adjacent topics in addition to cybernetics such as information theory, communications theory, control theory, game theory and systems theory.

A second English edition was published in 1964 by Methuen & Co. with no changes to the original text, alongside the original preface.

An Introduction was translated into many languages. Editions were published in Russian and French in 1957, Spanish in 1958, Czech, Polish, and Hungarian in 1959, German in 1965, and Bulgarian and Italian in 1966.

== Reception ==
Reviews of An Introduction to Cybernetics were mostly positive, alongside some mixed opinions. Positive reviews highlighted Ashby's clear explanations of complex concepts, as well as his inclusion of examples and exercises. Detractors were critical of Ashby's marked new vocabulary, replacing the usual terminology even when unnecessary ("components with independence" in lieu of "degrees of freedom", "decaying variety" as compared to "entropy", "transmission of variety" versus "transmission of information" etc). Additionally, some took issue with the philosophical nature of Ashby's claims in a largely mathematically rigorous text.

== Table of contents ==
=== Part one: Mechanism ===
In this section, Ashby lays out a terminological grounding for his later discussions of variety and regulation. He begins with a discussion of the analysis of systems in discrete states, and how they may change and become different. Along with a set of terms to be used, Ashby introduces the mathematical notation that he will use for the rest of the book.

=== Part two: Variety ===
This part of the book introduces ideas of information and communication. Ashby discusses his concept of "variety", which he defines roughly as a set of possible states that a system may take.

=== Part three: Regulation and Control ===
Part Three deals with what Ashby notes is the "central theme" of cybernetics. It relates Ashby's concept of variety with regulation and control. Finally, it contains an explanation of Ashby's well known Law of Requisite Variety.

== Key ideas ==
=== New terms ===
This work introduces a new set of terms for discussing properties of systems, both biological and mechanical. Donald M. MacKay, a pioneer of information theory and cybernetics himself, writes in a review in a 1957 issue of Nature:

Ashby's treatment of the 'decay of variety' in a determinate system is particularly illuminating, and his discussions of the concepts of 'system', 'model', 'black box' and the like are excellent in the clarity with which they distinguish his usage from other people's.

In An Introduction, Ashby ties these terms together as a new vocabulary for cybernetics, and formally defines them.

=== Law of requisite variety ===
One of Ashby's most important ideas in An Introduction was his "Law of Requisite Variety", also known "Ashby's Law" and "the adequacy principle." It serves as an important connection between the ideas that Ashby sets forth in this work and the information theory of Claude Shannon. The law, as it is usually stated, is "Only variety destroys variety." Pickering explains that the law holds that a regulator must be able to at least represent that which it regulates, writing:

A regulator is a blocker—it stops some environmental disturbance from having its full impact on some essential variable, say, as in the case of the Homeostat. And then it stands to reason that to be an effective blocker one must have at least as much flexibility as that which is to be blocked. If the environment can take on twenty five states, the regulator had better be able to take on at least twenty five as well—otherwise, one of the environment’s dodges and feints will get straight past the regulator and upset the essential variable.

== Influence ==
This work is best known for pulling together related fields in information theory and relating them to the (as of then) mostly theoretical field, and providing biological applications of general theories of systems. An Introduction is widely seen as a classic, influential text in the field of cybernetics, going beyond the work already done by Norbert Wiener in laying out a basic mathematical theory.
