= Jason Jixuan Hu =

American cyberneticist

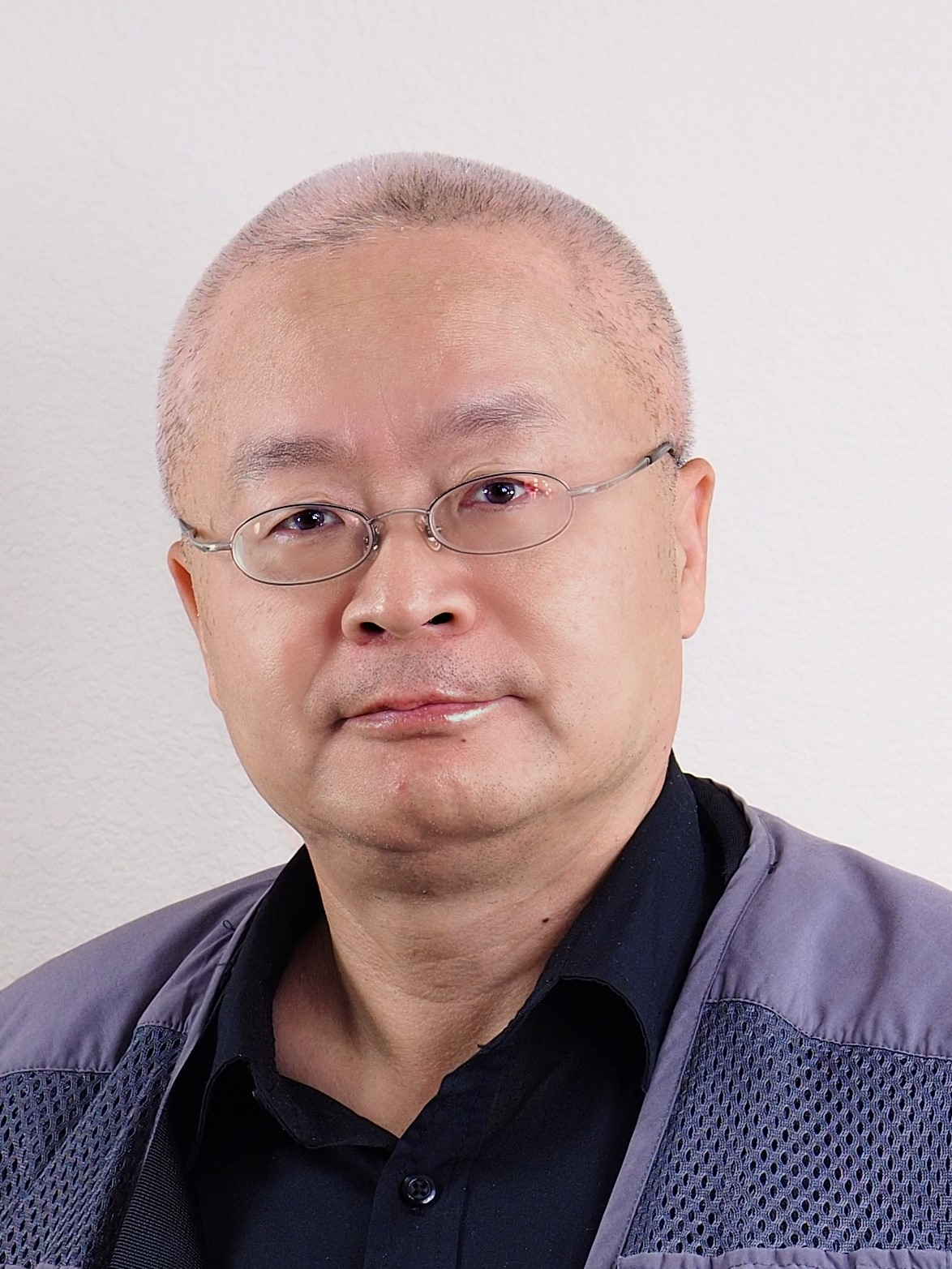
- Born: 1957 (age 68–69); Kunming, Yunnan, China
- Education: Heilongjiang Institute of Commerce; George Washington University
- Scientific career
- Fields: Cybernetics; System Science
- Workplaces: WINTOP Organizational Learning Laboratory

Jason Jixuan Hu (born 1957 in Kunming, PRC.) is a Chinese American cyberneticist, independent scholar and managing director of WINTOP Organizational Learning Laboratory, and organizer/facilitator of the Club of Remy. He is noted for his work on "cognitive capacity in human communication, conflict resolution and cooperation solicitation," and on view on distance education in America.

== Biography ==
Born in Kunming, Yunnan, Hu obtained his B.Sc. from Heilongjiang Institute of Commerce, in Electronic Engineering in 1981, became a Certified System Engineer by Sino-Japanese Software Developing Center in System Dynamics Modeling in 1985, and obtained his Ph.D. from The George Washington University, with a primary focus in Management & Organizations and secondary focus in Philosophy of Social Sciences (1995);

Hu came to the US in 1986 as a visiting scholar to study Cybernetics and System Science, back to China in 1988 and left PRC after what happened on June 4, 1989 in Tiananmen Square. He became an American citizen after September 11, 2001. After a diversified career path spanning from research and teaching, entrepreneurship and senior management, training and consulting, he is currently an independent researcher and managing director of WINTOP Organizational Learning Laboratory, a consulting-training partnership based on Phoenix, Arizona, USA., and organizes an international intellectual discussion club, the Club of Remy (clubofremy.org). Hu is a lifetime member of American Society for Cybernetics and initialized CYBCOM forum in 1993, a listserv now evolved into a Google Group. He has traveled extensively in 30+ countries and studied 9 major religions. His teaching/training/consulting experiences involve organizations in U.S., China, Hong Kong, Austria, Japan and Thailand. He speaks Mandurian and English proficiently, with limited conversational capacity in German and Japanese.

== Work ==
Hu's inquiries can be classified into three periods:

- His early work (1982–1993) focused on social problem-identification due to his overwhelming experience with the severe social pathologies in PRC caused by communism as well as by the unhealthy elements of the Chinese traditions. His inquiry about what's wrong in the society of China started at his teenager years during the notorious "cultural revolution" stirred up by Mao.
- His mid-term work (1993–2009) were social-solution oriented, focusing on a new communication theory, large-scale education model, and grassroot participation model, and his scope of concern expanded from the country of China to the country of the United States, and to the sustainability issues of the whole planet.
- Hu's latest work (2010–current) is to establish a theory of the evolution of our civilization based on a synthesis of the cultural gene hypothesis with the multi-layer self-organization theory, which is his extension of classic (single-step) self-organization theories (e.g. of Ashby, Von Foerster, Prigogine & Haken.) This theory provides a new perspective to understand the history, the current status and the possible futures of the human civilization, suggesting priorities for and calling for attentions of action leaders at various levels in our societies.

Hu has also developed a four-dimensional system thinking framework which was applied to comparative study of organizational dynamics, an expansion of Ashby's law of requisite variety, a taxonomy of system thinking, and to a new perspective of second-order cybernetics and second-order science, all presented in Club of Remy YouTube Channel.

== Selected publications ==
- Hu, Jixuan (January 1988). "On the Two-Phase Phenomenon of Value Sets". Cybernetics and Systems. 19 (6): 479–490. doi:10.1080/01969728808902181.
- Hu, Jixuan (January 1988). "The End of Utopia: On the Nondesignability of Social Systems". Cybernetics and Systems. 19 (6): 491–500. doi:10.1080/01969728808902182.
- Hu, Jixuan; Sun, Xiaoyun (July 1991). "China's Economic Reform as a Case of Large-Scale Social Change". Cybernetics and Systems. 22 (4): 505–514. doi:10.1080/01969729108902297.
- Hu, J. X. (1994). "O niemożliwości projektowania systemów żywych: wnioski z nieudanego eksperymentu krajów socjalistycznych. Projektowanie i systemy". Agadnienia Metodologiczne Nauk Praktycznych. 14: 64–65.
- Hu, Jixuan (June 1995). "Communicatics and communicationism as knowledge tools for a sustainable civilization". Proceedings 1995 Interdisciplinary Conference: Knowledge Tools for a Sustainable Civilization. Fourth Canadian Conference on Foundations and Applications of General Science Theory. pp. 282–291. doi:10.1109/ktsc.1995.569184. ISBN 978-0-7803-3365-9. S2CID 152605204.
- Hu, J. J. (June 2014). "Two human fates of human becoming are we splitting into two species?". 2014 IEEE Conference on Norbert Wiener in the 21st Century (21CW). pp. 1–5. doi:10.1109/norbert.2014.6893914. ISBN 978-1-4799-4562-7. S2CID 11717379.
- Hu, Jason Jixuan (2015). "Anthropocene? Yes, but Stratified – Measuring Existing Societies with Civilization Level Index". Proceedings of the 59th Annual Meeting of the ISSS - 2015 Berlin, Germany. 1 (1).
