= Method of levels =

Perceptual control theory psychotherapy

The Method of Levels (MOL) is an application of perceptual control theory (PCT) to psychotherapy. A therapist using MOL does not make diagnoses or propose solutions or remedies. As the client talks about some matter, the therapist is alert to subtle interruptions indicating a shift of awareness to a perspective about that matter. The therapist asks what they were just thinking or feeling, and as the patient talks about that the therapist continues to be alert for intrusion of background thoughts or feelings. This process of "going up a level" continues until the higher-level sources of contradictory goals come into concurrent awareness from a yet higher level, allowing an apparently innate process of reorganization to resolve the conflict that was distressing the client.

== History ==
The Method of Levels originated in Bill Powers' phenomenological investigations into the mobility of awareness relative to the perceptual hierarchy. He prepared a description of it for his 1973 book, Behavior: The Control of Perception, but the editor persuaded him to remove that chapter and the chapter on emotion. He continued to demonstrate the technique at PCT conferences and other meetings. In the 1990s, David Goldstein of New Jersey (US) began using MOL in clinical practice with patients, and Timothy A. Carey, an Australian psychologist, also began using it and obtained a doctorate in clinical psychology primarily so that he could test it. Cary, Warren Mansell, Sara Tai, Eva de Hullu, and their colleagues and students continue to research, practice, and teach MOL on several continents. Eva de Hullu (Open Universiteit, the Netherlands), Warren Mansell (Curtin University, Perth, Australia) and Ana Churchman (Manchester University, UK) are leading collaborative development of an accreditation program on PCT principles, under the umbrella of the International Association for Perceptual Control Theory (IAPCT).

== Theory ==
PCT is the theoretical foundation of MOL. PCT models satisfactory psychological functioning as successful control, and conversely it models psychological distress as the subjective consequence when ability to control important experiences is impaired. The most common source of distress found in practice is internal conflict, because each system in a conflict denies control to the other.

Conflict is usually transitory, but when it is not resolved and becomes chronic it may manifest as "inflexible control" and in distress processes such as worry, suppressed emotion, and self-criticism. In the PCT model, these are subjective experiences of dysfunction due to disruption of successful control. The various therapeutic systems take such experiences as diagnostic of the many identified psychological disorders. Because PCT provides a unified model of these, MOL has been called a transdiagnostic therapy, but as it has no dependency on diagnostic categories it is a-diagnostic.

A conflict cannot be resolved while attention vacillates between incompatible goals and focuses on the experiences which are distressing. When the client has relocated attention above the level of the hierarchy from which the conflicting goals are set, an innate process called reorganization re-establishes satisfactory control. It is hypothesized that when any therapy is successful the mechanism is this innate capacity for reorganization in the client's nervous system, irrespective of the therapist's conceptual 'toolkit'.

MOL enables resolution of internal conflict so that it no longer impairs control. When a person recovers control, the source of distress is eliminated, along with the associated behavioral and affective manifestations.

== Method ==
The core process is to redirect attention to higher levels in the client's control hierarchy by recognizing "background thoughts", bringing them into the foreground, and then being alert for more background thoughts while the new foreground thoughts are explored. By this "up-a-level" process, the client is helped to lead the way to the systems responsible for generating the conflict, and away from a preoccupation with the symptoms and efforts immediately associated with the conflict. If other matters of concern subsequently rise to awareness, the client may schedule time to talk about them. When the level-climbing process reaches an end state without encountering any conflicts, the need for therapy may have ended.

== Research and Validation ==
Carey's research into MOL began with the question whether MOL is sufficient in itself as an effective and efficient way of helping people resolve psychological distress. The result is clearly affirmative. More than two decades of case histories by different therapists in different settings working with different people about a wide range of different problems show that nothing additional is needed to enhance MOL. MOL is used effectively as the sole therapeutic modality with adults and young people, in primary care and secondary care, in alcohol and other drug services, in pain management clinics, in schools, in prisons, and in different countries and cultures.

An advantage for research is that records of ongoing evaluation have been a feature of MOL since its introduction into clinical practice, because MOL was developed as a therapy within the routine clinical settings in which it would be used. Numerous evaluations of MOL used in different settings by different therapists have been published. These evaluations include novel methodologies such as Time 1 and Time 2 rather than pre- and post-designs and benchmarking, and innovative metrics have been introduced such as the efficiency ratio. The evaluations have also included investigations into the perspective of patients as well as that of referring GPs.

In conjunction with another clinical innovation, patient-led appointment scheduling (PLAS), MOL has been demonstrated to reduce waiting times and improve access to services with no reduction of its effectiveness and efficiency as therapy. In addition to the many evaluations of MOL in primary care settings, a randomised controlled trial in subjects with first-episode psychosis demonstrated that the retention in the trial at final follow-up was 97%, suggesting a successful feasibility outcome. The feedback provided by participants delivered initial evidence of the intervention for this population. The approach may also be effective in the treatment of sleep disorders and suicidality.

== See also ==
- Coherence therapy
- Common factors theory
- Focusing (psychotherapy)
- Metacognition

== Sources and Further Reading ==
- Carey, T. A. (2005). "Can patients specify treatment parameters?". Clinical Psychology and Psychotherapy. 12 (4): 326–335. doi:10.1002/cpp.454.
- Carey, T. A. (2006). The Method of Levels: How to do psychotherapy without getting in the way. Hayward, CA: Living Control Systems Publishing. ISBN 978-0-9740155-4-5. OCLC 63193390.
- Carey, T. A. (2010). "Will you follow while they lead? Introducing a patient-led approach to low intensity CBT interventions". In Bennett-Levy, J.; Richards, D.; Farrand, P.; Christensen, H.; Griffiths, K.; Kavanagh, D.; Klein, B.; Lau, M. A.; Proudfoot, J.; Ritterband, L.; Williams, C.; White, J. (eds.). Oxford guide to low intensity CBT interventions. Oxford: Oxford University Press. pp. 331–338.
- Carey, T. A. (2011a). "As you like it: Adopting a patient-led approach to the issue of treatment length". Journal of Public Mental Health. 10 (1): 6–16. doi:10.1108/17465721111134510.
- Carey, T. A. (2011b). "Exposure and reorganization: the what and how of effective psychotherapy". Clin. Psychol. Rev. 31 (2): 236–48. doi:10.1016/j.cpr.2010.04.004. PMID 20447745.
- Carey, T. A. (2016b). Hold that thought: Two steps to effective counseling and psychotherapy with the Method of Levels. Chapel Hill, NC: New View Publications. ISBN 978-0-944337-59-2.
- Carey, T. A.; Carey, M.; Mullan, R. J.; Spratt, C. G.; Spratt, M. B. (2009). "Assessing the Statistical and Personal Significance of the Method of Levels". Behavioural and Cognitive Psychotherapy. 37 (3): 311–324. doi:10.1017/S1352465809005232. ISSN 1352-4658. PMID 19371458.
- Carey, T. A.; Mansell, W.; Tai, S. J. (2015-06-05). Principles-based counselling and psychotherapy: A Method of Levels approach. London: Routledge. doi:10.4324/9781315695778. ISBN 978-0-415-73877-4. OCLC 898113412.
- Carey, T. A.; Mullan, R. J. (2007). "Patients taking the lead: A naturalistic investigation of a patient led approach to treatment in primary care". Counselling Psychology Quarterly. 20 (1): 27–40. doi:10.1080/09515070701211304.
- Carey, T. A.; Mullan, R. J. (2008). "Evaluating the Method of Levels". Counseling Psychology Quarterly. 21 (3): 247–256. doi:10.1080/09515070802396012.
- Carey, T. A.; Mullan, R. J.; Carey, M. (2007). "Patient lead treatment: An idea whose time has come". Clinical Psychology Forum. 1 (177): 9–12. doi:10.53841/bpscpf.2007.1.177.9.
- Carey, T. A.; Tai, S. J.; Mansell, W.; Huddy, V.; Griffiths, R.; Marken, R. S. (2017). "Improving professional psychological practice through an increased repertoire of research methodologies: Illustrated by the development of MOL" (PDF). Professional Psychology: Research and Practice. 48 (3): 175–82. doi:10.1037/pro0000132.
- Carey, T. A.; Tai, S. J.; Stiles, W. B. (2013). "Effective and efficient: Using patient-led appointment scheduling in routine mental health practice in remote Australia". Professional Psychology: Research and Practice. 44 (6): 405–414. doi:10.1037/a0035038.
- Griffiths, R.; Mansell, W.; Carey, T. A.; Edge, D.; Emsley, R.; Tai, S. J. (September 2018). "Method of levels therapy for first-episode psychosis: rationale, design and baseline data for the feasibility randomised controlled Next Level study". BJPsych Open. 4 (5): 339–345. doi:10.1192/bjo.2018.44. PMC 6094182. PMID 30140445.
- Griffiths, R.; Mansell, W.; Carey, T. A.; Edge, D.; Emsley, R.; Tai, S. J. (October 2019). "Method of levels therapy for first-episode psychosis: The feasibility randomized controlled Next Level trial". Journal of Clinical Psychology. 75 (10): 1756–1769. doi:10.1002/jclp.22820. ISSN 0021-9762. PMID 31240723. S2CID 191638657.
- Grzegrzolka, J.; McEvoy, P.; Mansell, W. (1 May 2019). "Use of the Method of Levels Therapy as a Low-Intensity Intervention to Work With People Experiencing Sleep Difficulties". Journal of Cognitive Psychotherapy. 33 (2): 140–156. doi:10.1891/0889-8391.33.2.140. PMID 32746389. S2CID 150433287.
- Macintyre, V. G.; Mansell, W.; Pratt, D.; Tai, S. J. (2021). "The Psychological Pathway to Suicide Attempts: A Strategy of Control Without Awareness". Frontiers in Psychology. 12 588683. doi:10.3389/fpsyg.2021.588683. PMC 8012495. PMID 33815194.
- Mansell, W. (June 2005). "Control theory and psychopathology: an integrative approach". Psychology and Psychotherapy: Theory, Research and Practice. 78 (2): 141–178. doi:10.1348/147608304X21400. PMID 16004696.
- Mansell, W.; Carey, T. A; Tai, S. (2012). A transdiagnostic approach to CBT using method of levels therapy. CBT distinctive features series. Milton Park, Abingdon, Oxon; New York: Routledge. doi:10.4324/9780203081334. ISBN 978-0-415-50763-9. OCLC 774499959.
- Powers, W. T. (2009). "PCT and MOL: a brief history of Perceptual Control Theory and the Method of Levels". The Cognitive Behaviour Therapist. 2 (3): 118–122. doi:10.1017/S1754470X08000111. ISSN 1754-470X.
