= Gary Cziko =

American educational psychologist

- Born: Gary A. Cziko
- Known for: Contributions to cognitive and educational psychology
- Scientific career
- Fields: Psychology; education

Gary Cziko is an American researcher, and author in the field of educational psychology at the University of Illinois at Urbana–Champaign who has worked on the philosophical model known as perceptual control theory (PCT) – a model whose original developer, William T. Powers, was his mentor. He has written two introductory books on the subject, and in 1995 he introduced the concept of "universal selectionism" into the PCT model.

== Education and career ==
Cziko received a Bachelor of Arts degree in psychology from Queens College, City University of New York, a Master of Arts degree in psychology from McGill University in Montreal, Quebec, Canada, in 1975, and a Doctor of Philosophy (Ph.D.) from McGill University in 1978. He was a post-doctoral research fellow for the Quebec Ministry of Education at the University of Montreal during 1978–79. Since 1979, Cziko has been on the faculty of the University of Illinois at Urbana–Champaign. He became an associate professor in 1986 and a full professor in 1998.

== Selected publications ==
In 1989, Cziko published one of his first academic papers relating to PCT:

- Cziko, Gary (1989). "Unpredictability and Indeterminism in Human Behavior: Arguments and Implications for Educational Research" (PDF). Educational Researcher. 18 (3): 17–25. doi:10.3102/0013189X018003017. S2CID 17154755. Archived from the original (PDF) on January 24, 2013.

He has also authored two introductions to PCT, both published by MIT Press:

- Cziko, Gary (1995). Without Miracles: Universal Selection Theory and the Second Darwinian Revolution. MIT Press. ISBN 0-262-03232-5. LCCN 95000943.
- Cziko, Gary (2000). The Things We Do : Using The Lessons of Bernard and Darwin to Understand The What, How, and Why of Our Behavior. MIT Press. ISBN 0-262-03277-5. LCCN 99051843.

== Awards and recognitions ==
In 2008, Cziko was a Fulbright Scholar in Chile.
