= Internal model =

Internal model may refer to:

- Mental model, a representation of reality within the mind of an individual.
- Internal model principle, an application of the good regulator theorem to the control of systems described by ordinary differential equations.
