= Treval Clifford Powers =

American materials scientist (1900–1997)

- Born: August 2, 1900
- Died: June 30, 1997 (aged 96)

Treval Clifford Powers (1900–1977) was a 20th-century materials scientist considered "the father of the modern science of cement-based materials." He made contributions to the understanding of the structure of fresh and hardened cement paste and achieved fundamental results on concrete rheology, workability, consistency, durability, shrinkage and swelling, creep, and resistance of concrete to frost, sulfates and abrasion. He was the father of systems theory pioneer William T. Powers.

Born on February 8, 1900, in Palouse, Washington, Powers studied chemistry at Willamette University in Salem, Oregon, a small private college founded in 1846. From 1930 until his retirement in 1965 he conducted research at the famous PCA (Portland Cement Association) Laboratories (located initially in Chicago and later in Skokie, Illinois). For many years until his retirement in 1965 he served as the PCA Director. The ACI (American Concrete Institute) bestowed on Powers its highest award, the Wason Medal for Materials Research three times, in 1933, 1940 and 1948. In 1957, Powers received the S.E. Thompson Award from the ASTM (American Society for Testing and Materials) and, in 1976, the Arthur R. Anderson Award from the ACI. In 1961 he became an Honorary Member of ACI and, also in 1961, he was awarded an honorary Doctor of Science degree by the University of Toledo. During 1967-68 he lectured as visiting professor at the University of Toronto. He died on June 30, 1997, in Green Valley, Arizona. The founding conference of IA-ConCreep at M.I.T. in 2001 was dedicated to Powers, to honor his memory.
