= Homeostat =

Device that was able to maintain homeostasis

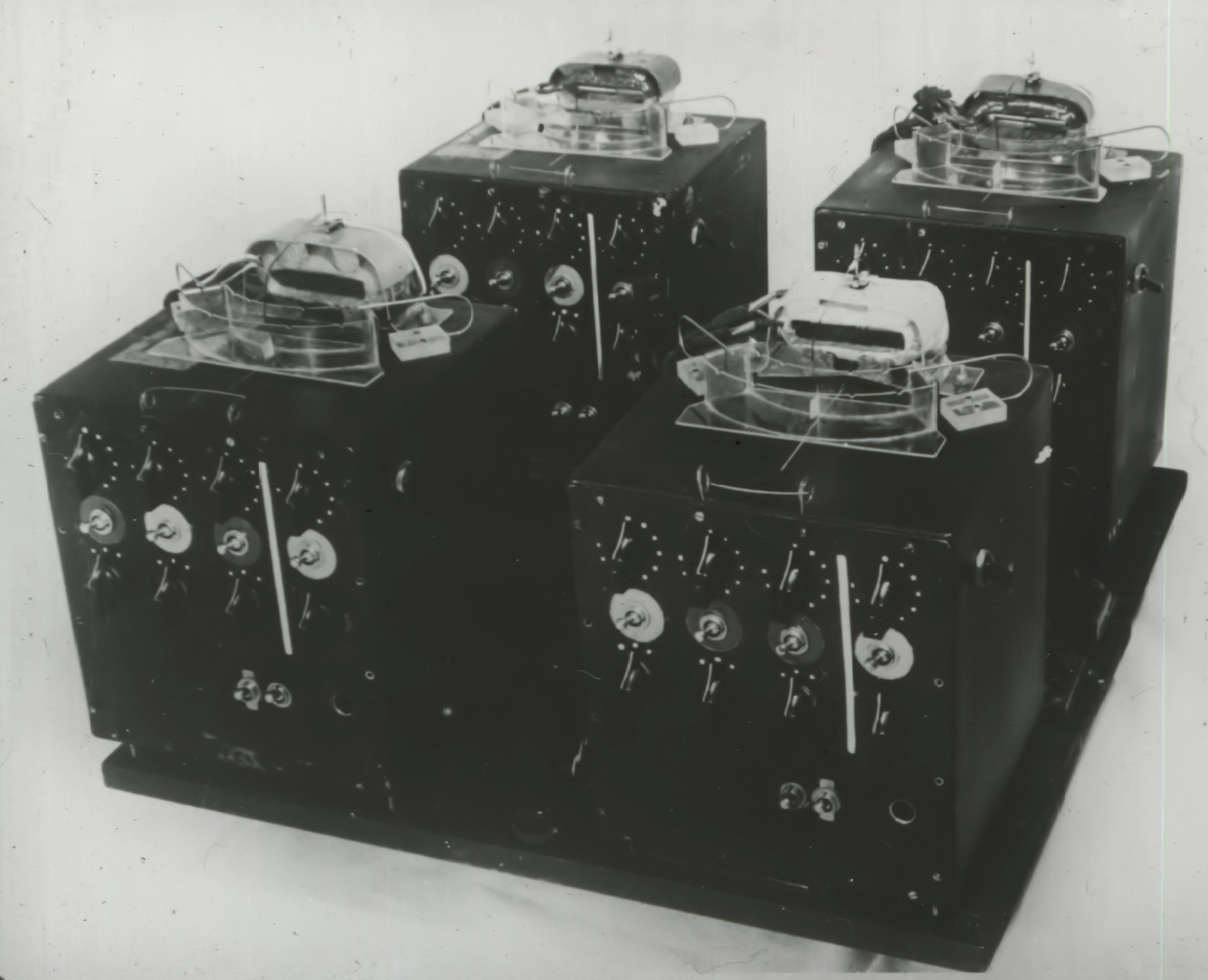
W. Ross Ashby's homeostat

The homeostat is one of the first devices capable of adapting itself to the environment. It exhibited behaviours such as habituation, reinforcement and learning through its ability to maintain homeostasis in a changing environment. It was built by William Ross Ashby in 1948 at Barnwood House Hospital.

== System ==
After a few technical hiccups with short-circuits causing burn-outs, the homeostat was finally completed on 16 March 1948. It was an adaptive ultrastable system, consisting of four interconnected Royal Air Force bomb control units with inputs, feedback, and magnetically driven, water-filled potentiometers. It illustrated his law of requisite variety — automatically adapting its configuration to stabilize the effects of any disturbances introduced into the system. The object of control is the angular deviation from the central position of four magnets, one atop each unit. If perturbed, the magnets return from their displaced position back to their homeostatic position with customizable stability or even instability, depending on the choices of circuit and structural parameters.

In 1946, Ashby described the design of the units thus "Its principle is that it uses multiple coils in a milliammeter & uses the needle movement to dip in a trough carrying a current, so getting a potential which goes to the grid of a valve, the anode of which provides an output current." It was the realization of what he had described in 1946 as an "Isomorphism making machine".

When Alan Turing heard of Ashby's intention to build the homeostat, he wrote to Ashby to suggest that he could run a simulation on Turing's Automatic Computing Engine (ACE) instead of building a special machine.

The first published account of the homeostat appeared under the title of "Design for a Brain" in the December 1948 issue of 'Electronic Engineering', where he speculates about a perfected homeostat that could eventually play chess "with a subtlety and depth of strategy beyond that of the man who designed it."

In 1949 Time described it as "the closest thing to a synthetic brain so far designed by man".

In 1952, Ashby demonstrated it at the ninth Macy conference on cybernetics. In the same year he published a description of the homeostat in his influential book Design for a brain. In total, between 1946 and 1967, he wrote 38 entries about the homeostat in his journal.

In her online biography of Ashby, Jill Ashby wrote of the homeostat, that "In 1961, Ross took it with him to the Biological Computing Laboratory, University of Illinois and left it there when he retired in 1970. Apparently, it was damaged soon after that when the area where it was being kept was flooded."

== See also ==
- Systems theory
