= Good regulator theorem =

Theorem in cybernetics

The good regulator theorem is a theorem conceived by Roger C. Conant and W. Ross Ashby that is central to cybernetics. It was originally stated as "every good regulator of a system must be a model of that system". That is, any regulator that is maximally simple among optimal regulators must behave as an image of that system under a homomorphism.

More accurately, every good regulator must contain or have access to a model of the system it regulates. And while the authors sometimes say the regulator and regulated are 'isomorphic', the mapping they construct is only a homomorphism, meaning the model can lose information about the entity that is modeled. So, while the system that is regulated is a pattern of behavior in the world, it is not necessarily the only pattern of behavior observable in a regulated entity.

== Theorem ==
This theorem is obtained by considering the entropy of the variation of the output of the controlled system, and shows that, under very general conditions, that the entropy is minimized when there is a (deterministic) mapping $h:S\to R$ from the states of the system to the states of the regulator. The authors view this map $h$ as making the regulator a 'model' of the system.

With regard to the brain, insofar as it is successful and efficient as a regulator for survival, it must proceed, in learning, by the formation of a model (or models) of its environment.

The theorem is general enough to apply to all regulating and self-regulating or homeostatic systems.

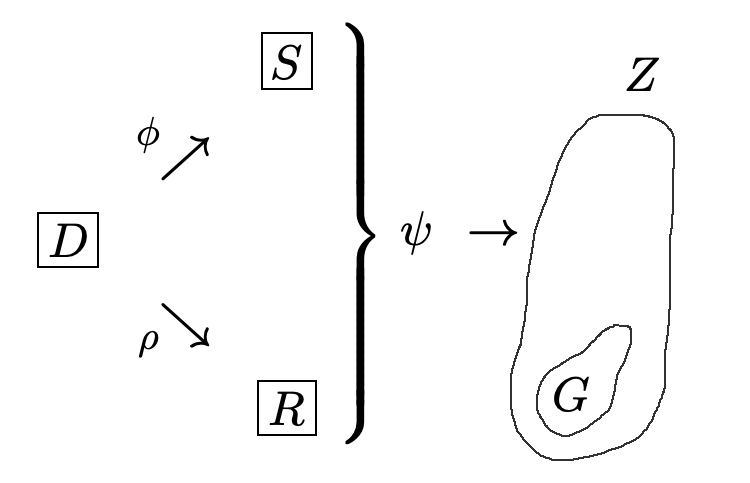
Variables involved in good regulation as according to the authors.

Five variables are defined by the authors as involved in the process of system regulation. $D$ as primary disturbers, $R$ as a set of events in the regulator, $S$ as a set of events in the rest of the system outside of the regulator, $Z$ as the total set of events (or outcomes) that may occur, $G$ as the subset of $Z$ events (or outcomes) that are desirable to the system.

The principal point that the authors present with this figure is that regulation requires of the regulator to conceive of all variables as it regards the set $S$ of events concerning the system to be regulated in order to render in satisfactory outcomes $G$ of this regulation. If the regulator is instead not able to conceive of all variables in the set $S$ of events concerning the system that exist outside of the regulator, then the set $R$ of events in the regulator may fail to account for the total variable disturbances $D$ which in turn may cause errors that lead to outcomes that are not satisfactory to the system (as illustrated by the events in the set $Z$ that are not elements in the set $G$).

The theorem does not explain what it takes for the system to become a good regulator. Moreover, although highly cited, some concerns have been raised that the formal proof does not actually fully support the statement in the paper title.

== Related theorems ==
In cybernetics, the problem of creating ethical regulators is addressed by the ethical regulator theorem. The construction of ethical regulators is a general problem for any system (e.g., an automated information system) that regulates some domain of application.

When restricted to the ordinary differential equation (ODE) subset of control theory, it is referred to as the internal model principle, which was first articulated in 1976 by B. A. Francis and W. M. Wonham. In this form, it stands in contrast to classical control, in that the classical feedback loop fails to explicitly model the controlled system (although the classical controller may contain an implicit model).

Building on the same idea of the good regulator theorem, recent research in reinforcement learning has claimed that agents, modeled as goal-conditioned policies in environments governed by fully observable Markov processes, inherently encode a predictive model of their environment within their policy—provided certain assumptions about their performance hold. In other words, all the information necessary to accurately simulate the environment is embedded in the agent’s policy. This finding parallels the Good Regulator Theorem by formally showing that any agent capable of generalizing across a sufficiently diverse set of goal-directed tasks must learn an implicit predictive model of its environment.

== See also ==
- Analogy § Mathematics
- Internal model (motor control)
- Map–territory relation
- Variety (cybernetics)
- Controllability
