= William T. Powers =

William T. Powers (August 29, 1926 – May 24, 2013) was a medical physicist and an independent scholar of experimental and theoretical psychology who developed the perceptual control theory (PCT) model of behavior as the control of perception. He was the son of cement scientist and economist Treval Clifford Powers.

PCT demonstrates that rather than controlling their behavioral outputs, living things control their perceptual inputs, and explains how they vary their behavior as the means of controlling inputs to their sense organs. Living control systems differ from those specified by engineering control theory (a thermostat is a simple example), for which the reference value (setpoint) for control is specified outside the system by what is called the controller, whereas in living systems the reference variable for each feedback control loop in a control hierarchy is generated within the system, usually as a function of error output from a higher-level system or systems. Powers and his students and colleagues in diverse fields have developed many demonstrations of autonomous negative feedback control with endogenously generated reference values, and computer models or simulations that replicate observed and measured behavior of living systems (human and animal, individuals and groups of individuals) with a very high degree of fidelity (0.95 or better). Some corresponding control structures have been demonstrated neurophysiologically.

Powers also designed the board game Trippples, originally produced by Benassi Enterprises, later transferred to Aladdin Industries and granted US Patent 3,820,791 in 1974. He published a number of science fiction stories. Through the network of science fiction writers, he was also an early advocate of Dianetics, which he abandoned in the early 1950s.

== Selected bibliography ==
- Powers, William T. (1973). Behavior: The control of perception. Chicago: Aldine de Gruyter. ISBN 0-202-25113-6. 2nd ed. (2005) New Canaan: Benchmark Publications. Chinese tr. (2004) Guongdong Higher Learning Education Press, Guangzhou, China. ISBN 7-5361-2996-3.
- Powers, William T. (1989). Living control systems. [Selected papers 1960–1988.] New Canaan, CT: Benchmark Publications. ISBN 0-9647121-3-X.
- Powers, William T. (1992). Living control systems II. [Selected papers 1959–1990.] New Canaan, CT: Benchmark Publications.
- Powers, William T. (1998). Making sense of behavior: The meaning of control. Powers Family pub., Piedmont, WV. ISBN 979-8-218-32419-3
- Powers, William T. (2008). Living Control Systems III: The fact of control. [Mathematical appendix by Dr. Richard Kennaway. Includes computer programs for the reader to demonstrate and experimentally test the theory.] New Canaan, CT: Benchmark Publications. ISBN 978-0-9647121-8-8.
