= Regulator (automatic control) =

Simple controller keeping a system stable

Single-stage pressure regulator

In automatic control, a regulator is a device which has the function of maintaining a designated characteristic. It performs the activity of managing or maintaining a range of values in a machine. The measurable property of a device is managed closely by specified conditions or an advance set value; or it can be a variable according to a predetermined arrangement scheme. It can be used generally to connote any set of various controls or devices for regulating or controlling items or objects.

Examples are a voltage regulator (which can be a transformer whose voltage ratio of transformation can be adjusted, or an electronic circuit that produces a defined voltage), a pressure regulator, such as a diving regulator, which maintains its output at a fixed pressure lower than its input, and a fuel regulator (which controls the supply of fuel).

Regulators can be designed to control anything from gases or fluids, to light or electricity. Speed can be regulated by electronic, mechanical, or electro-mechanical means. Such instances include;

- Electronic regulators as used in modern railway sets where the voltage is raised or lowered to control the speed of the engine
- Mechanical systems such as valves as used in fluid control systems. Purely mechanical pre-automotive systems included such designs as the Watt centrifugal governor whereas modern systems may have electronic fluid speed sensing components directing solenoids to set the valve to the desired rate.
- Complex electro-mechanical speed control systems used to maintain speeds in modern cars (cruise control) - often including hydraulic components,
- An aircraft engine's constant speed unit changes the propeller pitch to maintain engine speed.

== Bibliography ==
- Smith, Ed Sinclair (1944). Automatic Control Engineering. McGraw-Hill.
- Popov, E. P. (2014). The Dynamics of Automatic Control Systems. Pergamon. ISBN 9781483184623.
- Wang, Wego, ed. (2013). Mechatronics and Automatic Control Systems: Proceedings of the 2013 International Conference on Mechatronics and Automatic Control Systems (ICMS2013). Springer International Publishing. ISBN 9783319012735.

== See also ==
- Controller (control theory)
- Governor (device)
- Process control
