= Hofer =

Hofer may refer to:

== Organizations ==
- Hofer, the operating name of the supermarket chain Aldi in Austria and Slovenia
- Hofer Symphoniker (Hof Symphony Orchestra), a symphony orchestra based in Hof, Bavaria, Germany

== People ==
Hofer, from Höfer (yard, court), is a surname of German origin and may refer to:

- Adolf Hofer (disambiguation), several people
- Amalie Hofer, née Weissenrieder (1820–1872), German revolutionary and wife of Johann Hofer
- Andreas Hofer (disambiguation), several people
- Bruno Hofer (1861–1916), German fishery scientist, ichthyologist
- David Hofer (born 1983), Italian cross-country skier
- Dulce Ann Hofer (born 1967), Filipino politician
- Ernst Hofer (disambiguation), multiple people
- Evelyn Hofer (1922–2009), German–American photographer
- Franz Hofer (disambiguation), several people
- George T. Hofer (1938-2019), Filipino politician
- Gustav Hofer (born 1976), Italian TV journalist
- Helmut Hofer (born 1956), German mathematician
- Helmut Otto Hofer (1912-1989), Austrian zoologist and anatomist
- Hermann Hofer (1934–1996), German football player
- Jan Hofer (1952), German journalist and television presenter
- Johann Hofer (1810–1880), German lawyer and revolutionary, husband of Amalie Hofer
- Johanna Hofer (1896–1988), German film actress
- Johannes Hofer (1983), Italian luger
- Karl Hofer (1878–1955), German expressionist painter
- Lukas Hofer (born 1989), Italian biathlete
- Mari Ruef Hofer (1858/59-1929), American composer, lecturer, teacher, writer
- Maria Hofer (1894–1977), Austrian organist, pianist and composer
- Marly Hofer–Hasim (born 1974), Filipino politician
- Max Hofer (born 1999), Austrian racing driver
- Miklós Hofer (1931–2011), Hungarian architect
- Norbert Hofer (born 1971), Austrian politician (FPÖ)
- Othmar Hofer, Austrian luger who competed in the early 1970s
- Paul Hofer (disambiguation), multiple people
- Philip Hofer (book collector) (1898–1984), first curator of the Department of Printing and Graphic Arts, Houghton Library, Harvard University
- Polo Hofer (1945–2017), Swiss musician
- Ralph K. Hofer (1921–1944), U.S. fighter pilot
- Simon Hofer (born 1981), Swiss footballer
- Stefan Hofer, Swiss curler
- Verena Hofer (born 2001), Italian luger
- Walter Hofer (1893–c. 1971), German art dealer

== See also ==
- Hoffa (disambiguation)
