= Alfred Herbert (disambiguation) =

Alfred Herbert may refer to:

- Alfred Herbert, industrialist
  - Alfred Herbert (company)
- Alfred Herbert (painter)
- Xavier Herbert, Australian author also referred to as Alfred Francis Xavier Herbert
