= Hoffer =

Hoffer is a surname. Notable people with the surname include:

- Abram Hoffer (1917–2009), Canadian biochemist and psychiatrist
- Andrea C. Hoffer (born 1964), German painter
- Bernard Hoffer (born 1934), Swiss-American composer and conductor
- Bill Hoffer (1870–1959), American baseball player
- Charles Hoffer (1929–2017), American music educator
- Daniel Hoffer, American entrepreneur and venture capitalist
- Doug Hoffer (born 1951), American policy analyst
- Eric Hoffer (1898–1983), American philosopher
- Erwin Hoffer (born 1987), Austrian footballer
- Hera Hoffer (born 1987), American drag queen also known as Jinkx Monsoon
- Isaac Hoffer Doutrich (1871–1941), American Republican politician
- Kyle Hoffer (born 1989), American soccer player
- Leopold Hoffer (1842–1913) Hungarian-English chess player and journalist
- Melissa Hoffer, American lawyer for environmental law
- Paul Höffer, (1895–1949), German composer
- Peter James Hoffer, (born 1965), Canadian artist
- Richard Hoffer, American sports journalist and author
- Robert Hoffer, American businessman
- Ryan Hoffer (born 1998), American competitive swimmer
- Sylver Hoffer (1967–2011), French footballer
- Tony Hoffer, American songwriter

== See also ==
- Hofer (disambiguation)
- Höfer
- Hoffa (disambiguation)
