= Höfer =

Höfer (also spelled Hoefer) is a German surname, derived from Hof (yard, court), which refer to:

- Anton Höfer (1871–1949), Austro-Hungarian general and politician
- Botho Hoefer (1880–1958), German art director
- Candida Höfer (born 1944), German photographer, daughter of Werner Höfer
- Charlie Hoefer (1921–1983), basketball player
- Edmund Hoefer (1819–1882), German novelist and literary historian
- Ferdinand Hoefer (1811–1878), German-French physician
- Frederic Adolph Hoefer (1850–1938), Dutch lieutenant-general, militaria collector and archivist
- Hermann Höfer (1934–1996), German footballer
- Karl Höfer (1862–1939), German general
- Karlgeorg Hoefer (1914–2000), German typographer and calligrapher
- Regina Höfer (born 1947), German former athlete
- Steve Hoefer (born 1963), American television director and former stage manager
- Ulrich Höfer (born 1957), German professor of physics
- Werner Höfer (1913–1997), German journalist
- Wolfgang J. R. Hoefer, German-born Canadian research scientist, electrical and computer engineer

== See also ==
- Hofer (disambiguation)
- Hoffa (disambiguation)
- Hoffer
