= Hoffa =

Hoffa is a surname, and may refer to:

- Albert Hoffa (1859–1907), German orthopaedic surgeon
- Barbara Hoffa (born 1938), lawyer, judge and daughter of Jimmy Hoffa
- Else Hoffa (1885–1964), German gardener
- James P. Hoffa (born 1941), son of Jimmy Hoffa, leader of the Teamsters Union
- Jimmy Hoffa (1913–1975), American leader of the Teamsters Union and author
- Portland Hoffa (1905–1990), American comedian, actor, and dancer
- Reese Hoffa (born 1977), American shot-putter

== See also ==
- Rafael Araújo (basketball), Brazilian NBA basketball player, nicknamed Hoffa
- Hoffa (film), a 1992 biographical film about labor leader Jimmy Hoffa
- Hoffa fracture
- Hofer (disambiguation)
- Höfer, a surname
- Hoffer, a surname
