= Robert Allerton Park =

Coordinates: 39.998°N 88.65°W

- Allerton, Robert, Estate
- U.S. National Register of Historic Places
- U.S. Historic district
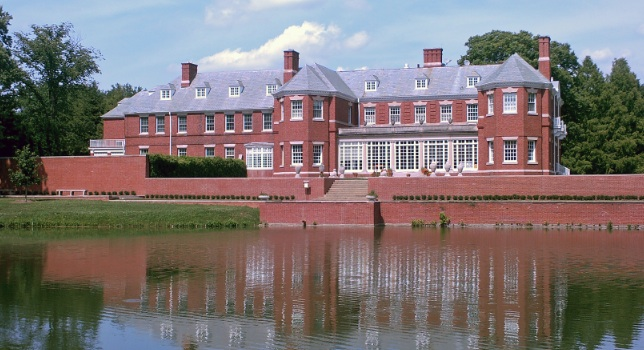
- Allerton House and Reflecting Pond

- Location within Illinois Location within the United States
- Location: 515 Old Timber Rd., Monticello, Illinois
- Area: 1,517 acres (614 ha)
- Built: 1900
- Architect: Borie, John Joseph; et al.
- Architectural style: Colonial Revival
- NRHP reference No.: 07000701
- Added to NRHP: July 18, 2007

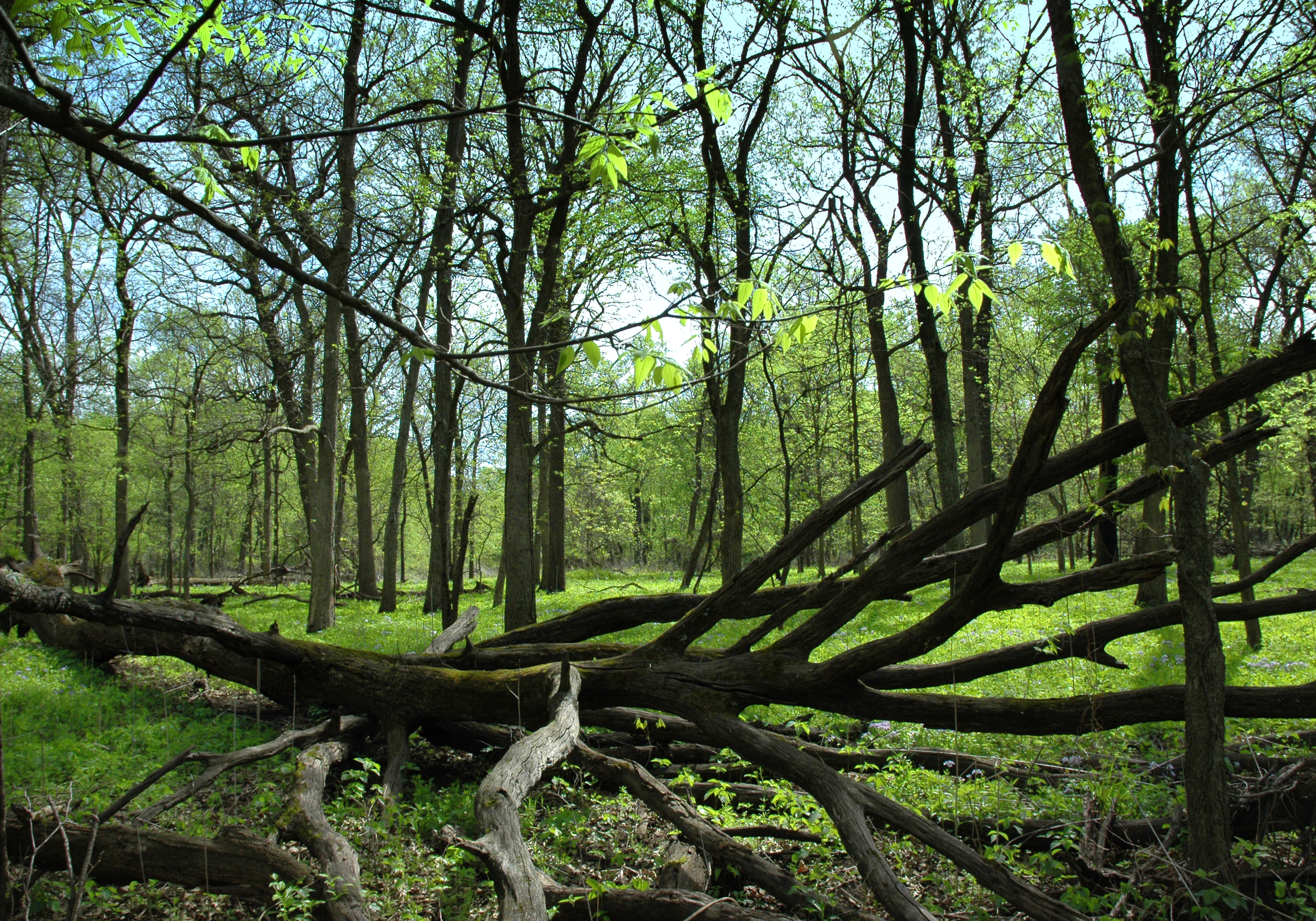
The Allerton Natural Area is a National Natural Landmark

The Robert Allerton Park is a 1,517-acre (614 ha) park, nature center, and conference center located in the rural Piatt County township of Willow Branch, (T 18 N, R 5 E) near Monticello, Illinois, on the upper Sangamon River. The park and manor house, The Farms, are attributed to owner Robert Allerton, industrialist heir, artist, art collector and garden designer. Robert donated the complex to the University of Illinois in 1946.

The National Park Service registered the Robert Allerton Estate as a National Historic Place on July 18, 2007. The Allerton Natural Area within the park was designated a National Natural Landmark in 1970.

As of 2007, the park was used by approximately 100,000 visitors per year. It has been described as "a vast prairie turned into a personal fantasy land of neoclassical statues, Far Eastern art, and huge European-style gardens surrounding a Georgian-Revival mansion".

== About Robert Allerton ==
Robert Henry Allerton (1873–1964) was heir to a Chicago banking and stockyard fortune created by his father, Samuel Allerton (1828–1914), one of the founders of Chicago's Union Stock Yards. Robert was artistically inclined from his youth, and he studied art for four years in Munich, Paris and London. In 1897 he returned to Illinois and settled on one of the family's farms near Monticello. Two years later he began work on the imposing brick mansion. Throughout the next forty–seven years Robert Allerton transformed the country house, The Farms, into a central Illinois showplace estate, with activity climaxing in the 1920s and early 1930s. In 1932 John Gregg (1899–1986), who would become Robert Allerton's legally adopted son in 1960, was employed full time to design new gardens and interior features in the house and help with the farm management. Gregg had been working for Chicago society architect David Adler (1882–1949) until the effects of the stock market crash in 1929 caused a drop in house design commissions. Gregg took the Allerton surname in 1965 following Robert Allerton's death.

Allerton also pursued ties with the University of Illinois. In September 1920 while living at The Farms he was asked by the university to serve as an advisory member to the Campus Plan Commission. The commission finished its work by October 1922 with the completion of the plan for the area south of the Auditorium by Charles A. Platt (1861–1933) and was discharged at that time. In 1926 Allerton established the Allerton Scholarships in American architecture. Annually, he invited graduating students in architecture and landscape architecture to The Farms.

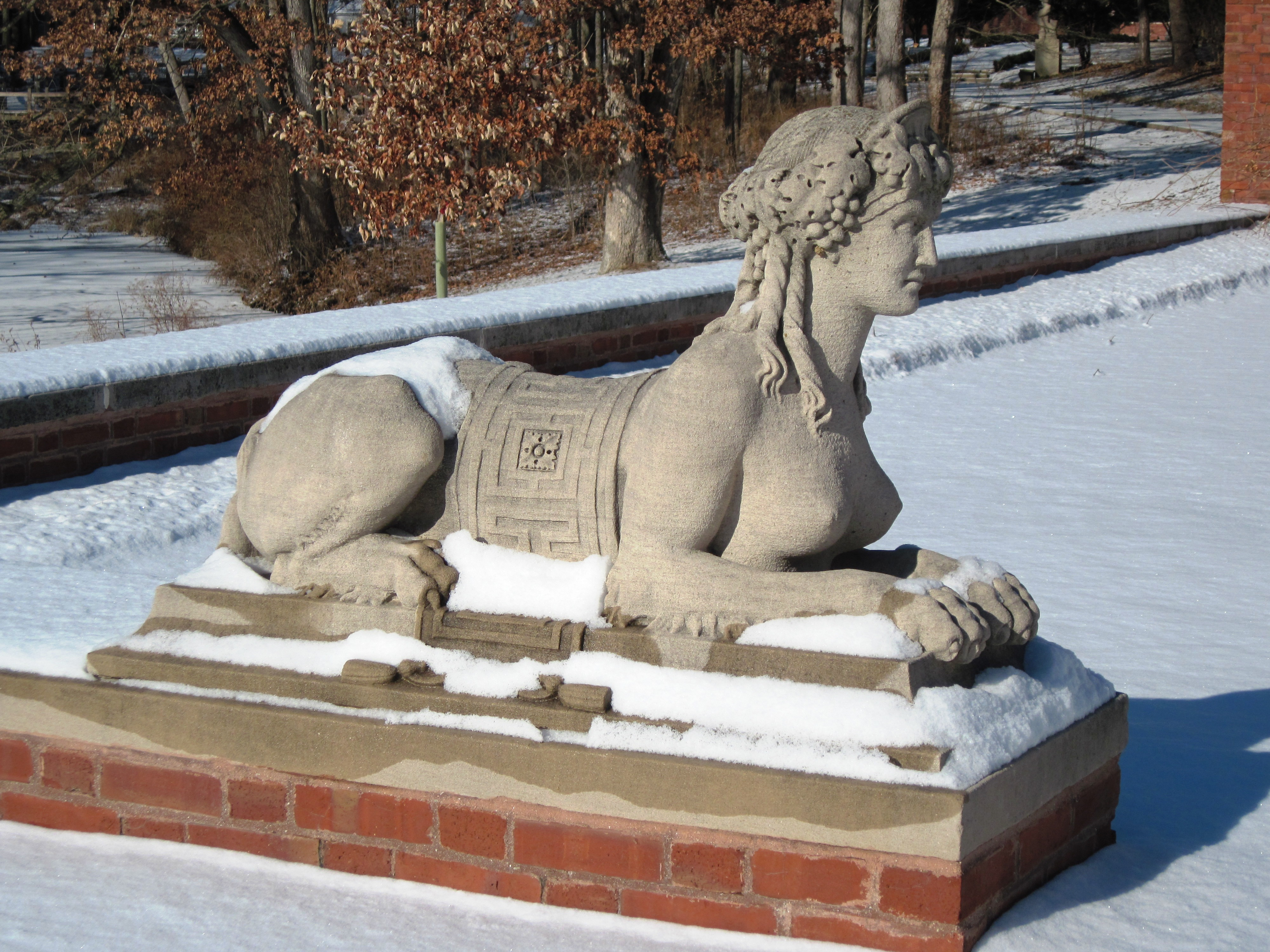
One of many sculptures in the park

== Gift to the University of Illinois ==
After the Great Depression, World War II, and U.S. federal income taxes made it more difficult to staff and operate stately homes like The Farms, the Allertons moved to Lawai-Kai (now Allerton Garden), Kaua'i, Hawaii, in 1946, after deeding the Piatt County property to the University of Illinois. At the time, taxes on Allerton land accounted for one-fifth of all tax revenue to support public works in the Willow Branch Township. The university, however, disputed its obligation to pay taxes on the estate, citing itself as a non-profit, tax exempt state institution. The Township, not wishing to lose a significant portion of its tax funding, protested. The university was found in 1949 to be in delinquency of unpaid real estate taxes. A later Illinois Supreme Court ruling resolved the matter: the university would make an annual payment in lieu of taxes to Piatt County. The public park and woodland acreage are today tax-exempt; only the income-generating farmland is taxed.

When deeded to the University on October 14, 1946, the 5,500 acre estate was worth approximately $1.3 million. Adjusted for inflation, it would be worth nearly $20 million in 2022 dollars.

The estate was logically divided into three areas. The principal area of 1,500 acres, originally known as the Woodland Property, was renamed the Robert Allerton Park. A smaller area of land located north of the park area was put to use for the Illinois 4-H Memorial Camp and its related recreational programs. Finally, the third and largest area composing 3,775 acres of land in eight different farms all north of the Sangamon river was farmed by tenants and the income used to support the rest of the park.

In 2007 the north farms were turned over to the University of Illinois Endowment in return for shares entitling the park to a percentage of the annual return on the endowment investments. The tenants are required to submit cash bids for leases on the land they farm.

The Allerton farms in Robert Allerton's time consisted of Piatt North No. 1-8 (PN No. 1-8) and Piatt South No. 1-6 (PS No. 1-6). PN No. 1 was the headquarters for the farm operations. The last of Allerton's buildings at this site were the c.1862 farmhouse, demolished in 2014, and the c.1912 Amenia wooden grain elevator that burned on 15 April 2015.

PN No. 2 became part of Allerton Park and has been used as a diversified farm. The c.1880 farmhouse was demolished in 2013, but several farm outbuildings remain. PN No. 1, 3–5, 7-8 are tenant farms turned over to the Endowment in 2007. PN No. 6 field acreage became part of PN No.4 when the farmstead buildings were demolished to make room for the WILL AM/FM/TV transmitter tower and equipment building in 1966.

Along with Robert Allerton's gift to the University of Illinois in 1946 he gave the six farms south of the Sangamon River to the Allerton Trust to be administered for the benefit of The Art Institute of Chicago. PS No. 1 was sold to the university in 1993 and added to Allerton Park. PS No. 2-3, 6 were sold to the Illinois Department of Natural Resources in 2000–2002. PS No. 4 and 5 were sold at auction in November 2000.

After the university took possession of the estate in October 1946 the park remained closed to the public because it lacked staff and amenities. The first event on the grounds was a gala garden party on 16 May 1947 to celebrate the inauguration of George D. Stoddard (1897–1981) as president of the University of Illinois. An open house on 24 May gave the public a glimpse of the future park, but the grounds remained closed until 1949.

Several years were required to prepare Allerton House as a conference center, with the first conference being held in June 1949. This was a Seminar on Educational Radio with participants from all over the United States and several foreign countries. The two-week conference was directed by university specialists in mass communications.

Allerton was a philanthropist for most of his life. Today, both Robert Allerton Park and Allerton Garden in Hawaii are open to the public. Allerton also made significant gifts and bequests to the Honolulu Museum of Art and the Art Institute of Chicago.

== Gardens ==
Allerton Park's gardens consist of a one-quarter-mile-long (0.40 km) formal garden, and a one-and-a-quarter-mile-long (2.0 km) sculpture walk extending westward from the end of the formal garden. The gardens incorporate many pieces of sculpture and ornaments.

The gardens are laid out along an axis oriented on the course of the Sangamon River, which runs from northeast to southwest through the park. Directions in the park are generally given as if the axis was straight east and west.

=== Fu Dog Garden ===
This garden, featuring an array of 22 blue porcelain Fu Dog statues in front of white fir trees, was originally commissioned in 1932 to display Allerton's collection of the ceramic statues. The focal point of the garden is these 22 statues mounted on concrete pedestals. Standing behind the pedestals are opposing rows of fir trees that form the garden's outer border. To allow enough sunlight to reach the garden, the surrounding woods were cut back approximately 100 feet. North of this garden stands the House of the Golden Buddhas, a folly that permits an aerial view of the garden.

=== Herb Garden ===
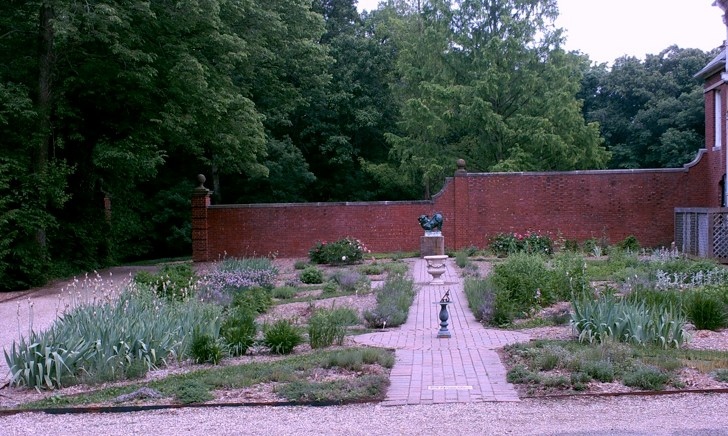
The Herb Garden

Located behind the stable, the Herb Garden, also called the Kitchen Garden, is characterized by its many green herbs and a green porcelain Fu Dog statue. It was redone into its present form in 1997, and plantings were started in 1999. In the years since then a sundial, an urn and a Longshadow planter have been added. Plantings were removed from half the garden in order to use it as a staging area for the Allerton House roofing project in 2015–2016. This area was replanted in May 2019.

=== Brick Walled Garden ===
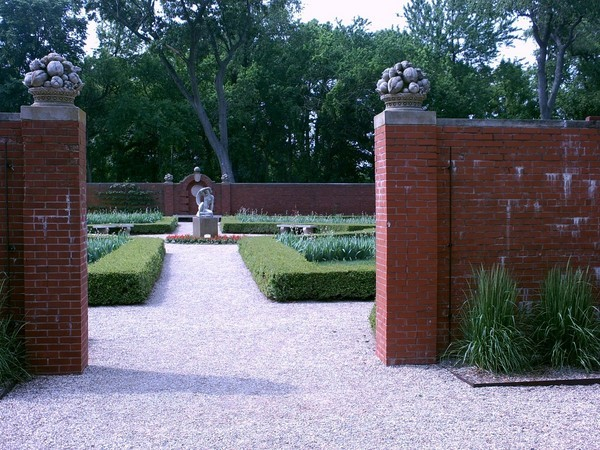
Walled Garden

The oldest garden on the Allerton Estate, the Brick Walled Garden was constructed in 1902 and is characterized by its tall, red-brick walls. It was originally a vegetable garden with bean trellises and a dipping pool in the center for irrigation. In the 1940s the plantings were changed to grassy quadrants bordered with hedges. The pool was replaced by the present center feature, the Girl with the Scarf sculpture. The sculpture, a white concrete figure by Lili Auer (1904– ), was added to the garden in 1942.

Owing to the decay of the brickwork, the garden was restored in the summer of 2010. Large parts of the walls were entirely demolished and rebuilt. Eight stone fruit baskets and six orb finials, or globe stones, dating from 1905 were restored to the new walls. New walkways, including an ADA wheelchair ramp, were installed, along with new plants, flowers, espaliered apple trees, and other landscape elements. In 2019 the pea gravel walks were converted to hard pebble aggregate to make them wheelchair accessible.

=== Triangle Parterre Garden ===
This garden was defined by towering arborvitae trees and annual flowers in triangular hedge parterre patterns in recent years. In spring 2019 the garden was cleared of vegetation and replanted with new arborvitae and boxwood hedges to bring it more in scale with Robert Allerton's original design. On the gateposts at the east and west ends are two stone animal sculptures called Assyrian Lions patterned after an ancient prototype. A stair tower pavilion built in 1987 stands beside the common wall with the Peony Garden. This replaced an earlier tower built to enclose the stairs to the now closed Wall Walk along the Peony Garden.

=== Peony Garden ===
This garden was designed to showcase nearly 70 varieties of peonies and is enclosed on three sides with concrete walls. The north wall has a cantilevered Wall Walk intended to permit visitors an aerial view of the garden. Due to age and deterioration of the wall, the walkway was closed by the 1980s.

At the east end of the garden stands a limestone copy of the Three Graces sculpture by Germain Pilon (1535–1590) in the Louvre, Paris.

=== Chinese Maze Garden ===
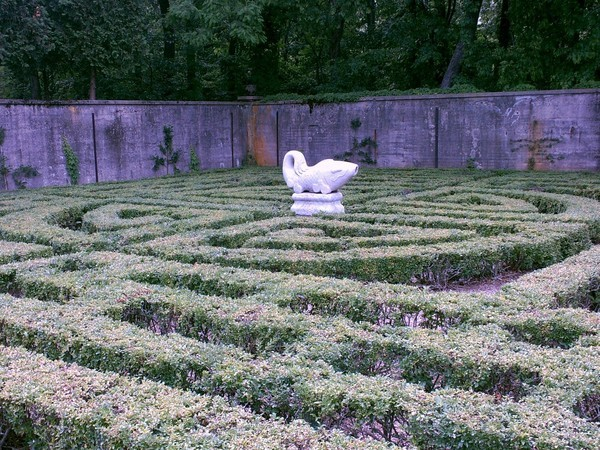
Chinese Maze Garden

The Chinese Maze Garden features two sets of hedges trimmed in a variation of the ancient Chinese symbol Shou, suggesting a maze. Two large fish fountain statues purchased by Robert Allerton in Peking (now Beijing) in 1930 sit in the center of each maze. Two stair towers outside the garden wall once permitted garden visitors access to an aerial view of the Maze from the Wall Walk. Unfortunately, the towers are no longer standing today. A hosta garden occupies the tower sites. The wrought iron gates were designed by John Borie, and were originally located at the Brick Wall Garden.

=== Annual Garden ===
Located adjacent to the meadow, the Annual Garden is characterized by its colorful flower beds and the Marble Faun statue at the east end. This figure is based on a Roman original in the Naples Museum. In May 2015 a limestone obelisk was placed in each of the long beds as a decorative feature. These obelisks were designed and carved by Charles Laing (1878–1959) of Chicago for Robert Allerton, and were formerly on either side of the Allerton House entrance door. They were removed from the garden in spring 2019.

=== Sunken Garden ===
Before the Sunken Garden was created in 1915, the area had been used as the estate's garbage dump. An earlier design of the garden featured gazebos at either end. John Gregg Allerton redesigned the garden several times with the final version being completed in 1932. The garden is now a favorite spot for weddings, concerts and graduation ceremonies.

The Sunken Garden features a large, open grassy area sunken below the usual ground level, surrounded by walls and with four towering Balinese style gateways. Atop the gateways are bronzed Guardian Fish statues called shachi. They were thought to protect the home from fires. Robert Allerton purchased them in Japan where he had seen the originals at Nagoya Castle. Gateways and fish were added c.1931.

== Features ==
=== House of the Golden Buddhas ===
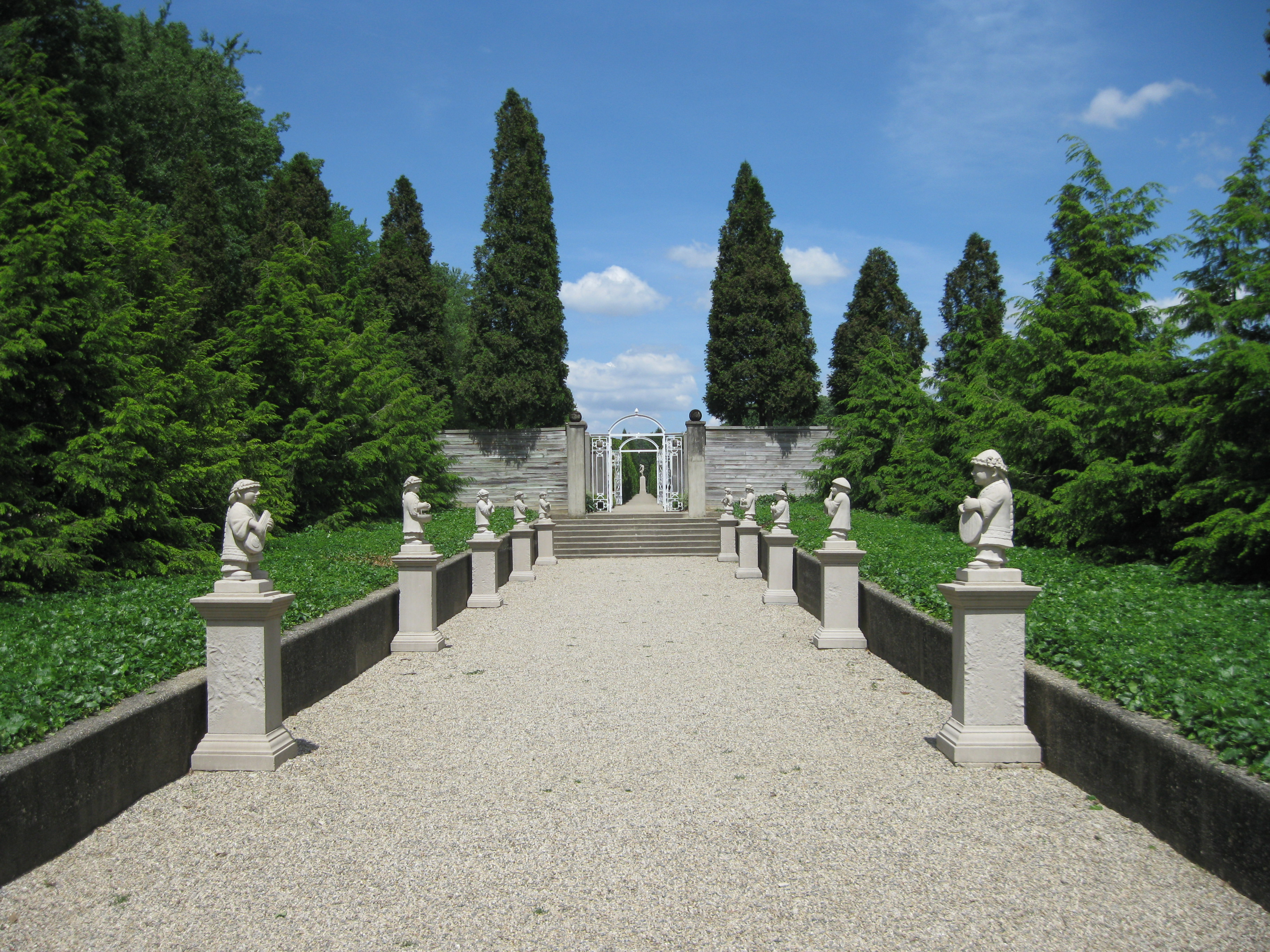
Avenue of the Chinese Musicians

Characterized by its golden Buddha statues, this structure is a two-story folly, the upper floor being an observation deck for the Fu Dog Garden. It is sometimes referred to as the "Fu Dog Tower". The lower part is an octagonal concrete tower built in 1917 that houses two gilded teakwood Buddhas from Thailand and a limestone sculpture of Hari-Hara, a Brahmin god. This sculpture is a copy of a 7th-century statue in the Musée Albert Sarraut in Phnom Penh, Cambodia. A circular iron stairway leads up to the ornate New Orleans style cast iron gazebo purchased and installed by Robert Allerton in 1924.

Glass doors and windows were added in 1986 for security, but the doors were removed in 2004. In summer 2007, extensive repairs were made to the tower, including restoration of the roof, and removal of the windows, which were not original to the building.

=== Avenue of the Musicians ===
Connecting the Maze Garden to the Sunken Garden, the Avenue of Musicians features a dozen statues representing various flute, drum, and stringed-instrument players. In 1912 this space was just a tree-lined avenue. The statues were moved from the Lost Garden located on the South Side of the park to this area in 1977. The present statues are copies of the originals purchased in England by Robert Allerton.

=== Sun Singer ===
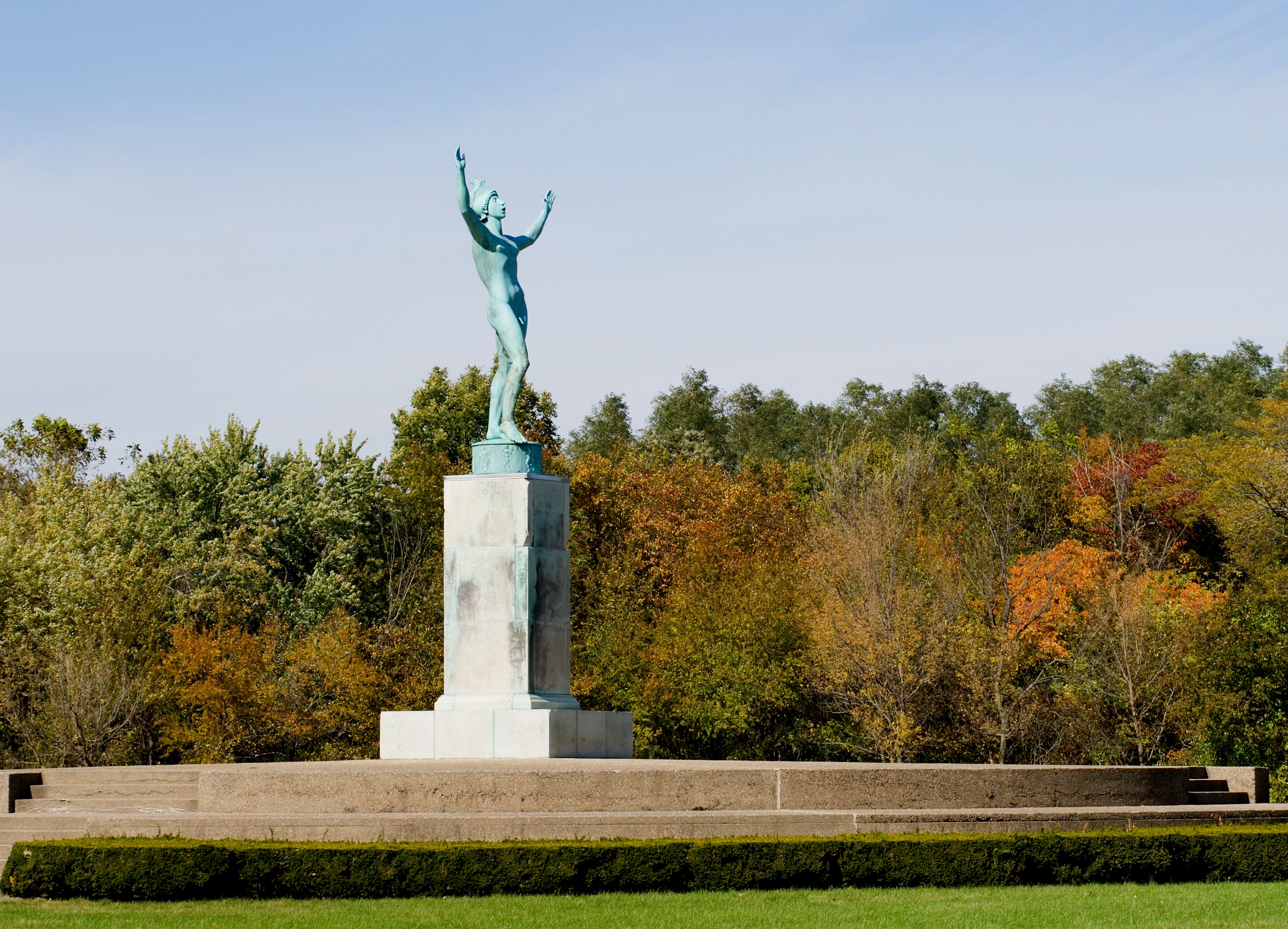
The Sun Singer

The sculpture walk concludes with The Sun Singer, a copy of an Art Moderne bronze sculpted by Swedish artist Carl Milles (1875–1955) in 1919 to stand overlooking the harbor in Stockholm. Robert Allerton commissioned a reduced size copy in 1929, but the artist sent a 16-foot full−size casting instead. After the statue arrived John Gregg Allerton designed a three−tiered platform styled after the Altar of Heaven in the Forbidden City of Beijing as a base in 1932.

The statue depicts the Greek sun god Apollo. On his helmet is the winged horse Pegasus, and relief figures of the nine Muses surround the base. Under his right foot is a tortoise, an allusion to the first lyre made of tortoise shell by Hermes and given to Apollo.

The Sun Singer underwent a $39,000 restoration in June–July 2007 to remove vandal graffiti and restore the patina of the 16 feet (5 m), 2,300 lb (1,000 kg) sculpture.

=== Death of the Last Centaur ===
Located in the forest past the formal gardens, this statue by the French artist Emile-Antoine Bourdelle (1861–1929) is of an allegorical scene, the death of Paganism. In a hazardous process seldom used today, the figure was cast in bronze to which gold had been added. Half man, half horse, the centaur represents the musician Chiron, who offered his own life in exchange for that of Prometheus, the benefactor of the human race in ancient Greek mythology.

After Robert Allerton purchased Death of the Last Centaur from Bourdelle in Paris in 1929, John Gregg Allerton designed this setting for it. The park's two major trails on the north side of the Sangamon River intersect here in the shape of a cross. A set of 60 concrete steps leads down toward the river, and four massive pillars stand at each end of the cross−path.

Death of the Last Centaur can also be reached by car on Old Timber Road. There is a small parking lot and a wooded path to the sculpture.

=== Frémiet Sculptures ===
Two bronze sculptures by the French artist Emmanuel Frémiet (1824–1910) were returned to Allerton Park in September 2016. The sculptures are not original Allerton pieces, but were donated to the University of Illinois in 1959 and subsequently placed along the park trails. They were loaned out for a traveling exhibition in 1980, moved from the park to the Krannert Art Museum in 1988, and finally placed in storage until new settings were created in the park.

Popularly called Gorilla Carrying off a Woman and Bear and Man of the Stone Age (Denicheur d'Oursons), they depict violent encounters between animals and Stone Age people. Subject to controversy since they were created in 1885 and 1887 because of the violent subject matter, they are however, immensely popular with park visitors who enjoy being surprised by finding them in the woods along the Orange Trail.

=== Reflecting Pond ===
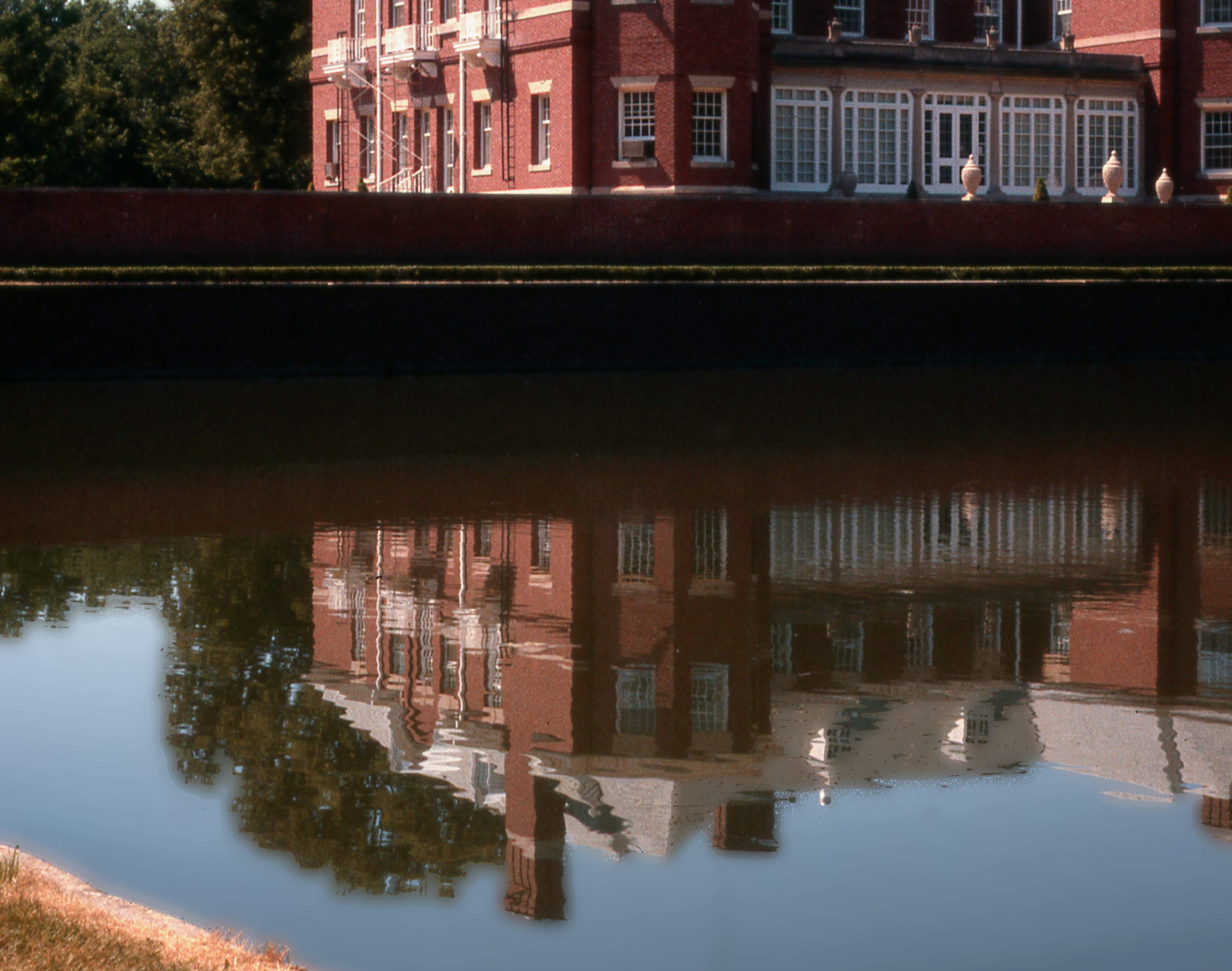
Reflecting pond at Robert Allerton Park

The pond was designed to simulate the River Thames' reflection of Ham House, one of the models for Allerton House. The pond is fed by a natural ground spring. A concrete dam and spillway allow excess water to run off into the Sangamon River.

The pond has been stocked with small fish such as bluegills and has a large population of native frogs and turtles.

When Robert Allerton died in 1964 his ashes were scattered over Lawai-Kai Bay in Hawaii, and there is no grave marker for him. In 1965 a granite boulder with the inscription "ROBERT ALLERTON HE GAVE HIS WOODLAND HOME TO THE UNIVERSITY OF ILLINOIS FOR THE PEOPLE TO ENJOY AND TO ENRICH THEIR LIVES" was installed in the pond to commemorate his life.

=== Old Levee Road ===
When the original bridge over the Sangamon River was built in 1915 a levee was constructed across the floodplain north of the river to form a level approach to the bridge. The entrance drive including the levee was paved with a single lane brick farm-to-market road running east from the Gate House, south to Allerton Road (Route 6; C.R. 1450N) and on into Monticello to accommodate fully loaded wagons going into town. An unpaved lane ran alongside the brick for the return trip. Both lanes were paved with asphalt in 1981. Two brick columns topped with statues of the goddess Diana and her companion, an Ephebe, were placed at the southeast gate on Allerton Road. When the old bridge was replaced by a new bridge in 2012 the entrance drive through the park was designated Old Levee Road.

=== Pioneer Cemeteries ===
Two small family cemeteries established in the 1840s are located in the park. The Sheppard Family cemetery has ten markers for members of that family and several others. It is located south of the road to the Sun Singer.

The West Family cemetery has markers for members of the John West family who settled near Willow Branch creek, now in the South Side of the park. The cemetery is located north of County Road 1300 North.

== Buildings ==
Robert Allerton Park contains three residences as well as a number of utility structures such as barns and greenhouses.

=== Allerton House (The Farms) ===
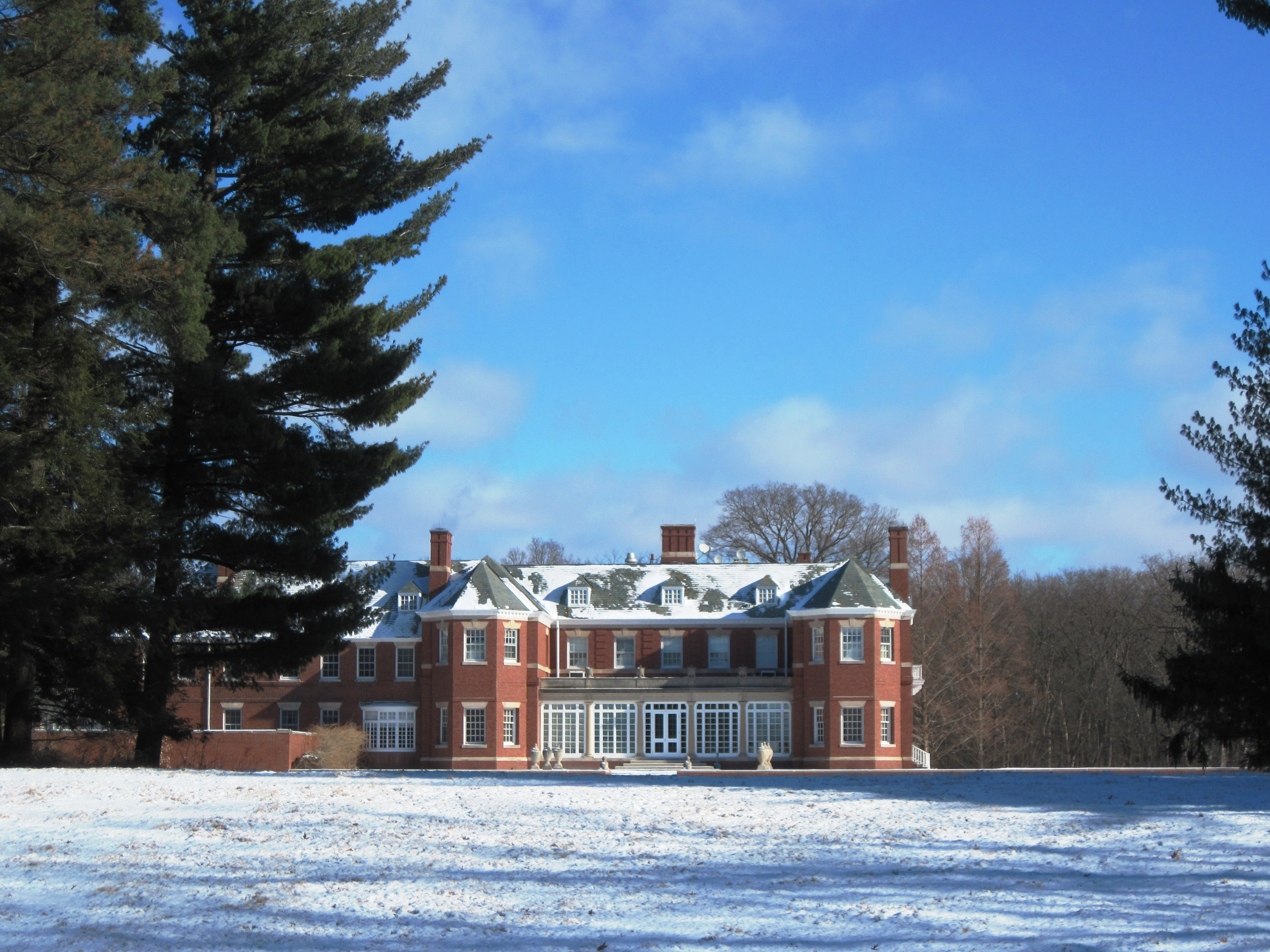
Allerton House in the winter

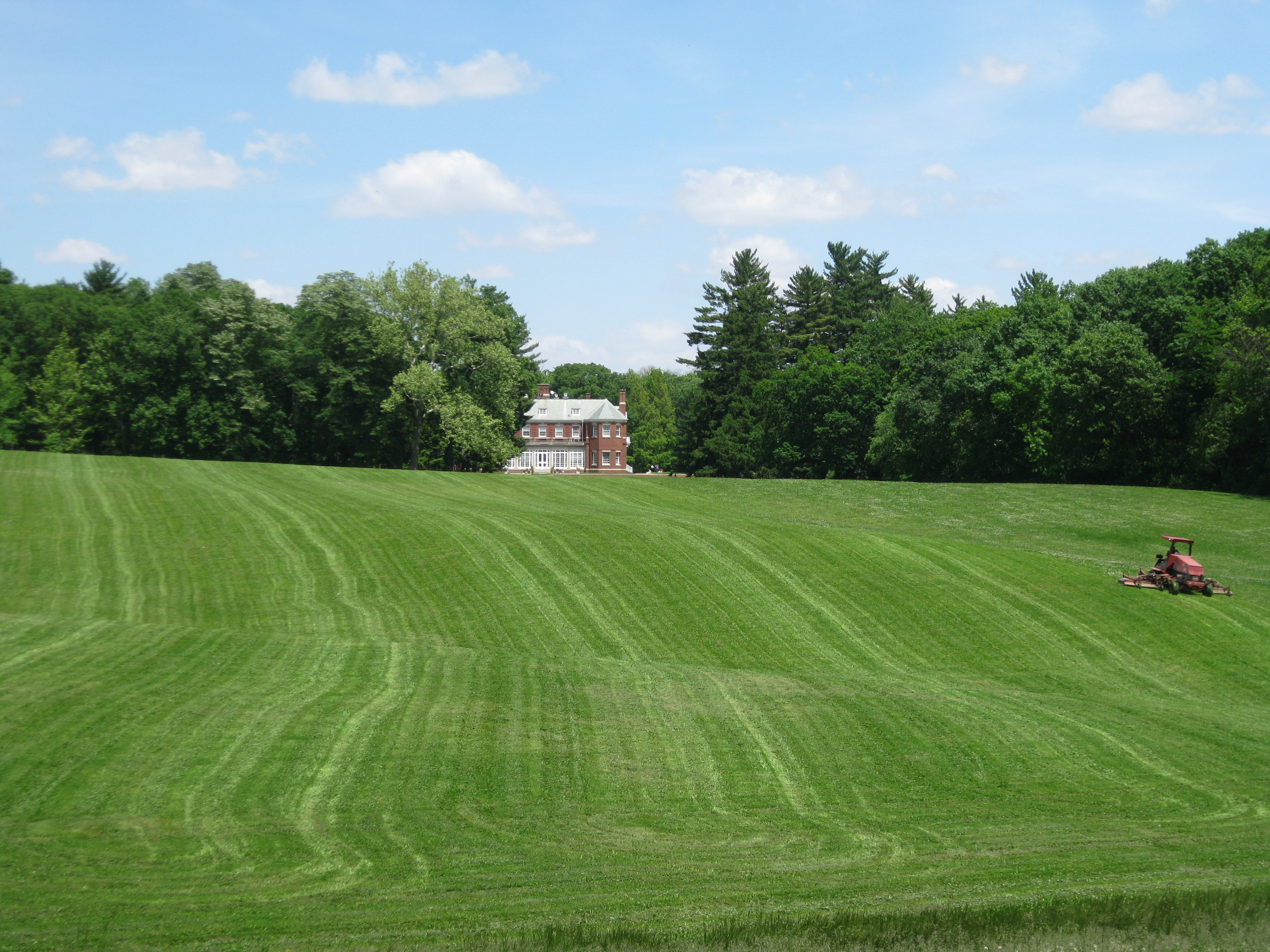
Allerton Park Mansion

The section of the park north of the winding Sangamon River includes Allerton's 40-room (30,000 sq. ft.) stately home, The Farms.

Construction of the house began on June 13, 1899, and was mostly finished about a year later, in 1900, at a cost of approximately $50,000. Adjusted for inflation, his house would have cost approximately $1.3 million in 2011 dollars. By fall of 1900, though the interiors were not completely finished, Robert Allerton moved into his new house. Construction of the supporting structures: the stables (1901–02), greenhouses (1902), Gate House (1903), and Brick Walled Garden (1902), followed afterward.

The style is Georgian-Revival, influenced by the work done at the office of McKim, Mead, and White. The architect, John Borie (1869–1925), was likely influenced more by 17th century English country houses, such as Ham House. Borie and Allerton together studied many examples of English houses and gardens before deciding on the architecture and design of Allerton House and the surrounding gardens. Like many English country homes, the main entrance is on the side of the house instead of the front, in order to offer more privacy to those entering and exiting the house.

The exterior materials used for the house were Dutch bricks laid in Flemish bond and Indiana limestone. The general contractor was from Chicago, William Mavor (1848–1904). The slate roofs of the house and stable were replaced with new Pennsylvania slate, copper flashing and lightning rods in August 2015–May 2016.

Today the house is used as a conference and retreat center, as well as a reception hall for weddings. In recent years, the house has been opened up for more events and is available to guests for overnight lodging as part of the Allerton Park Master Plan approved by the University of Illinois Board of Trustees in 2015.

==== Principal rooms ====
The House has five principal rooms, all located on the ground floor: the Gallery, the Library, the Butternut Room, the Pine Room, and the Oak Room. The purpose and names of some of these rooms have changed in the century since the house was built. Excepting the Gallery and the Library, all of these rooms have 12 ft ceilings. All of these rooms feature a fireplace, at least three windows, and a herringbone patterned hardwood floor.

- The Gallery
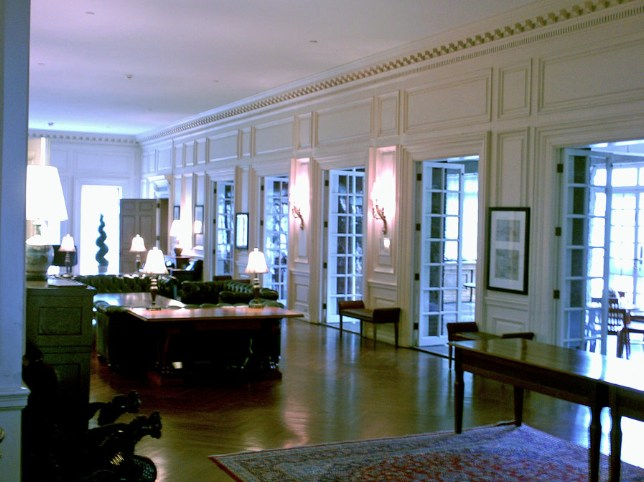
  The Gallery

The Gallery spans the entire length of the main house (excepting the servants' wing) and is approximately 90 feet long with a 14 ft ceiling height. It features a large marble fireplace, painted white pine paneling, and dentil crown molding. At the north end of the Gallery is the grand staircase that leads to the second story. Extending from the Gallery is the servants' wing, solarium, and the rest of the principal rooms. Above the fireplace hangs a portrait of Robert's father, Samuel Allerton (1828–1914), by Ellen Emmet Rand (1875–1941).

- The Library

Originally called the Music Room on the architect's drawings, the Library is two stories tall and features a parquet patterned floor. Three large, floor to ceiling windows provide a view and entry to the back terrace. Later remodeling added a second-story balcony and bookshelves on the interior wall to replace most of the wall paneling.

The second floor balcony is kept locked because it contains many rare, first edition books, as well as books containing Mr. Allerton's signature. When the Allertons moved to Hawaii in the 1940s, they took most of their books with them except for about 2000 books in this collection. Besides Robert Allerton's personal books there are many that belonged to his stepmother Agnes Allerton (1858–1924) and members of her family. There is a hand-written card catalog of the collection.

Hanging in the library are architectural plans for a stone mantel that was never built (it doesn't exist today). The paneling shown in those plans also does not exist today; in its place are many bookshelves.

The limestone plaque on the outside Library facade above the French doors facing the Library Terrace has ROBERT HENRY ALLERTON and the date MDCCCC incised on the surface. This takes the place of a traditional cornerstone.

- The Butternut Room

Known to be Robert Allerton's favorite room of the house, the Butternut Room was originally designated as the Dining Room. The room features butternut wall paneling. Above the fireplace hangs a portrait of Robert Allerton when he was around 24 years old, painted by his friend, Ellen Emmet Rand.

Window benches were designed for the room by John Gregg Allerton, and added in the 1930s.

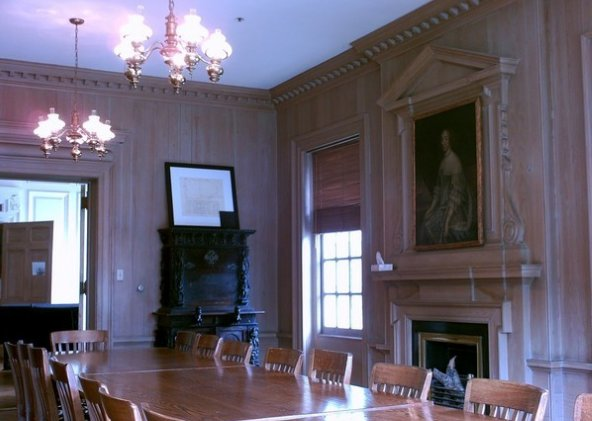
The Pine Room

- The Pine Room

This room was originally labeled as the Library for the house. It is today named after its pine wall paneling.

Over the fireplace is a portrait of Queen Henrietta Maria (1609–1669), wife of King Charles I (1600–1649) of England, by an unknown artist. On the opposite wall is a copy of a portrait of King Philip II (1527–1598) of Spain by Titian.

- The Oak Room

The smallest principal room, the Oak Room is located toward the back of the house, adjacent to the Library. It is so named for its oak wall paneling. A pair of French doors lead out to the back terrace. This room was marked as the Office on the original floor plans and was used for that purpose by Robert Allerton.

On the wall above the fireplace is a portrait of Robert's godmother, Anna Rathbone. Four floral paintings by Rainey Bennett (1907–1998), a friend of the Allerton family, are on the other walls.

Plans formerly hanging in the Gallery show a proposed, but never constructed, addition to the house that would have turned the Oak Room into an Octagonal Room and added a loggia.

==== Other rooms ====
Other rooms in the house include the breakfast room and upstairs bedrooms. The attached servants' wing held the pantry, kitchens, laundry, woodshed, and a refrigerated room. Rooms in this wing are used as offices for staff.

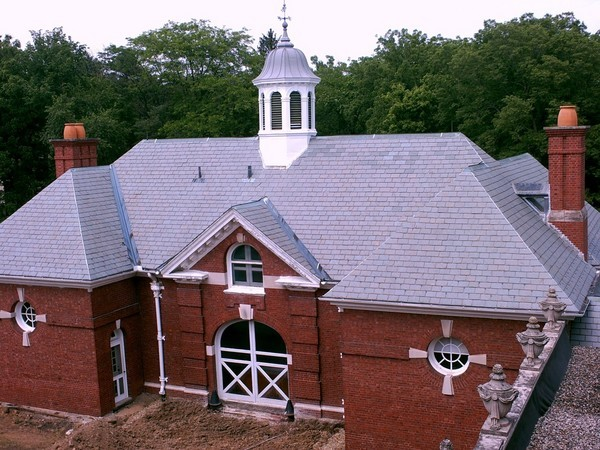
The Stable

=== The Stable ===
Originally built for horses, the stable was converted for use as an automobile garage when motor cars came to replace horse-drawn carriages. The stable was originally disconnected from the main house. The Marble Hall, constructed in 1912, connects the house and stable. Today the stable is used as kitchens and large dining area for conference guests.

The stable facade facing the Library Terrace has two carved Indiana limestone masks designed by John Borie and located above the arched doorways leading out of a former conservatory area now called the Breakfast Room. These are known as the Masks of Pan, and are a variation of the European Green Man, a benevolent woodland spirit carved onto many cathedrals and public buildings. They are bearded smiling faces with leafy foliage hair and curling rams horns. Festoons of fruit are suspended from each horn.

=== House in the Woods ===
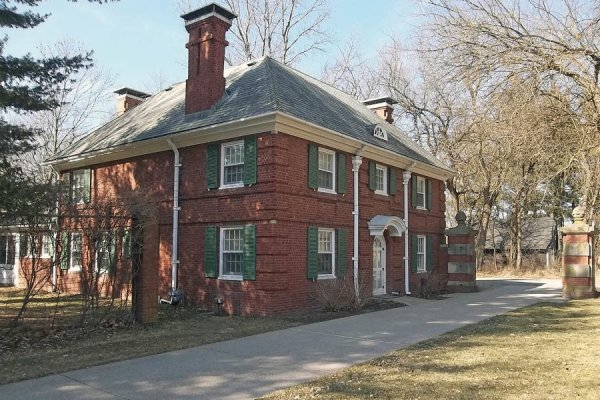
The Gate House

Located southwest of the formal gardens along Old Timber Road, this house has a blue-gray stucco exterior and some Georgian/Neo-Classical architectural elements. The Neo-Classical front door surround was formerly the entrance door of Allerton House, and was removed during the 1912 construction of the Marble Hall in that building.

Designed by Joseph Corson Llewellyn (1855–1932), this house was constructed in 1917 not of wood, the most common building material, but instead of hollow tile and blue-gray stucco. This was done to show that houses could be built of fire-proof materials without incurring additional expense.

The house was built on the site of the former Ashby family farm. Foundations of several of the farm buildings remain. On the north side of Old Timber Road can be seen the concrete foundation of a dairy barn that burned. The 4-H Memorial Camp boat house is built on part of the foundation of another barn. Other foundations can be found in the woods behind the house.

The house is located amongst a grove of evergreens, near the lake which forms the central axis of the 4-H Memorial camp.

=== Gate House ===
Architect John Borie designed this Colonial Revival style brick house built in 1903 as the residence of the head gardener. Its masonry exterior is composed of the same materials used in Allerton House, also designed by Borie. Today it stands at what originally was the end of the public road leading to Allerton's private grounds. After an exchange of lands, this road was no longer a public thoroughfare. When the estate became a public park the road was reopened as a county road (C.R. 1400N-575E) called Old Timber Road.

Rooms in the Gate House are now used to accommodate overnight visitors to the park. The Gate House lawn, formerly the site of Robert Allerton's tennis court, is the scene of concerts during warm weather.

=== Music Barn ===
In 1993 the farmstead with house and outbuildings formerly known as the Allerton Farm Piatt South No. 1 was bought by the University of Illinois from the Allerton Trust and incorporated into the park. This area is west of the south entrance along Allerton Road. After several years as an Environmental Learning Center the circa 1890 Dutch style horse barn on the property was remodeled in 2005 into a music performance venue seating 175 in the hayloft. Ventilation is regulated by opening and closing the hay door. Because the barn has natural air-conditioning, concerts are held in the spring and autumn. It was the home of the Allerton Music Barn Festival, a classical music festival sponsored by the University of Illinois School of Music, every September from 2007 to 2014. In 2016 the Festival became part of the Allerton Park Concert Series.

== Forests and meadows ==
The Allerton estate still encompasses hundreds of acres of forests and meadows which are used today by 4–H members, hunters, and hikers. A slate of charity runs, encompassing a 5K run, a 10K run and a half-marathon, are held annually in spring.

=== Southern Open space preserve ===
The section of the Robert Allerton Park south of the Sangamon River was left almost entirely natural open space preserve during the Allerton era. In response to a 1966 United States Army Corps of Engineers plan to build Oakley Dam downstream of Allerton Park on the Sangamon River, a grassroots organization called the Committee on Allerton Park (COAP) successfully campaigned to stop construction. This prevented what would have been the condemnation of a substantial portion of the park's riverine bottomland.

As protected natural space, the southern section of the Park contains a network of nature trails sloping down from parking areas toward the Sangamon River. Several of the trails have signs describing the floodplain river ecology of central Illinois. The southern section of the park and adjacent Sangamon River bottomland, a parcel of 1,000 acres (400 ha), was designated as the Allerton Natural Area, a U.S. National Natural Landmark, in 1970. The parcel was described in 1997 as 400 acres of upland oak-hickory forests, called "one of the oldest forest remnants in the Grand Prairie" and 600 acres of riverine bottomland, called "an exceptional floodplain forest of silver maple, cottonwood, and sycamore."

The southern section also contains a 55 acres (22 ha) restored prairie, one of the oldest prairie restorations in Illinois, begun in 1955 and now approaching maturity.

=== Lost Garden ===
The Lost Garden was laid out in 1932 on an east–west axis in the southwestern part of the area now known as the South Side. It was intended as a strolling and picnic garden for Robert Allerton and his friends. Although this area is now woodland and part of the U.S. National Natural Landmark, in 1932 it was farmland formerly owned by the Benz family. In typical Allerton fashion the garden was a gravel walkway lined with trees, flowers and statuary. A rectangular Summer House pavilion with a circular stair to the roof designed by John Gregg was added in 1936.

Remote from everything else on the estate, the garden was difficult to maintain as a public area and was gradually dismantled after 1960. Statues were moved elsewhere; the Summer House deteriorated and was torn down in 1972. Today the site is a grassy path between two concrete pedestal bases. Two brick seating walls remain by the Summer House floor slab. The site may be reached from a parking lot along Allerton Road.

== Notable events ==
The first automobile arrived at The Farms when Samuel Allerton presented Robert with a 1907 seven–passenger Stevens–Duryea Big Six Touring car. That car would be worth over $100,000 today.

Allerton Park was the venue for the Symposium on Principles of Self-Organization 8–9 June 1961 organised by Heinz von Foerster through the Biological Computer Laboratory based at University of Illinois at Urbana-Champaign.

Allerton Park was the venue for the Allerton Conference on Circuits and Systems in 1963, which continues today as the Allerton Conference on Communication, Control, and Computing through the Coordinated Science Laboratory at the University of Illinois Urbana-Champaign.

Allerton Park has been the venue for the Beak-Pines Organic Area Allerton Conference, an annual organic chemistry conference organized by the Department of Chemistry at the University of Illinois Urbana-Champaign.

The massive central Illinois Valentine's Day ice storm struck Allerton Park on 14 February 1990, resulting in much damage and a four-day power outage.

The Illinois Natural History Survey sponsored the Biodiversity Blitz, a 24-hour all-species inventory at Allerton Park on 29–30 June 2001. Over 2000 species of plants and animals were identified and recorded.

In celebration of the 2018 Illinois Bicentennial, Allerton Park was selected as one of the Illinois 200 Great Places by the American Institute of Architects Illinois component (AIA Illinois) and was recognized by USA Today Travel magazine, as one of AIA Illinois' selections for Illinois 25 Must See Places.

The Farms: An Allerton Folk School was launched in 2023.
