= Alfred Inselberg =

American-Israeli mathematician and computer scientist (1936–2019)

Alfred Inselberg (Hebrew: אלפרד אינסלברג) (22 October 1936, Athens, Greece – 30 December 2019, Tel Aviv, Israel) was an American-Israeli mathematician and computer scientist based at Tel Aviv University.

Inselberg started his career at the Biological Computer Laboratory based at University of Illinois at Urbana-Champaign. He was part of a cybernetics group working on biomathematics developing mathematical models of the ear, neural networks, and computer models for vision and non-linear analysis, gaining a PhD in mathematics and physics. During this period he participated in the Symposium on Principles of Self-Organization. He is particularly noted for his work on parallel coordinates (||-coords), which he proposed in 1959, for the visualization of multidimensional geometries (as in linear algebra) and multivariate problems.

== Early life and education ==
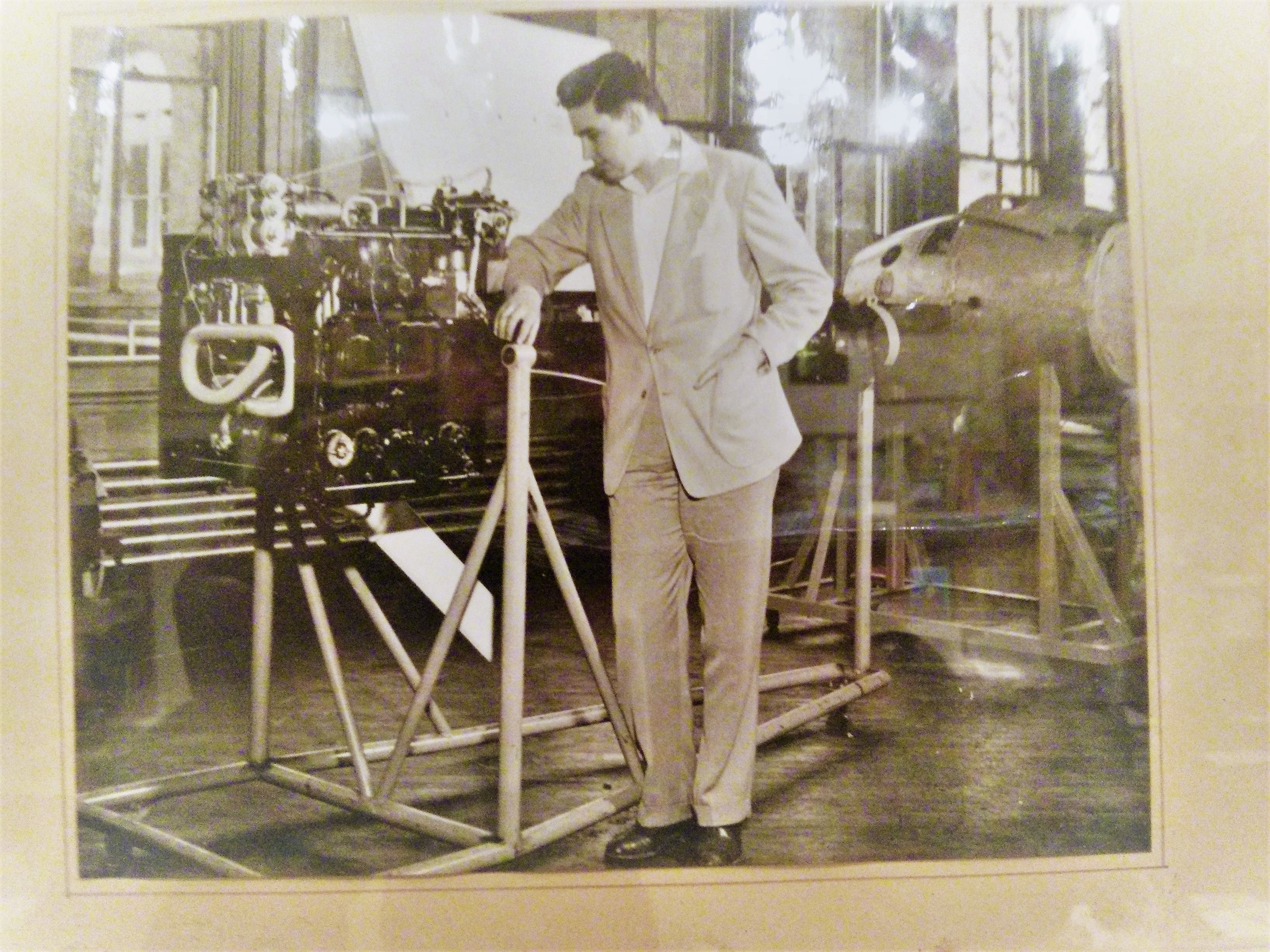
This is a sectioned Messerschmidt 163 Rocket Motor

Inselberg was born in Athens, Greece. Later he attended Whittingehame College in Brighton, England. He attended the University of Illinois at Urbana-Champaign (UIUC) receiving a B.Sc. in Aeronautical Engineering. Together with Gary van Sant, and two other students under the guidance of Paul Torda, they founded the University of Illinois Rocket Society in 1953; four years prior to Sputnik. Continuing his studies at UIUC he obtained in 1965 a Ph.D. in Applied Mathematics and Physics under the joint guidance of Ray Langebartel and Heinz von Foerster.

== Career ==
Inselberg held senior research positions at IBM where he developed a mathematical model of the ear (cochlea) (Time November 1974) and later collision-avoidance algorithms for air traffic control (3 USA patents). Concurrently he had joint appointments at UCLA, USC, Technion and Ben Gurion University. Since 1995 he has been a professor at the School of Mathematical Sciences of Tel Aviv University. He was elected senior fellow at the San Diego Supercomputing Center in 1996. His textbook on "Parallel Coordinates: Visual Multidimensional Geometry", was published by Springer.
