= Else Hoffa =

German gardener (1885–1964)

- Born: 21 March 1885; Würzburg, German Empire
- Died: 8 January 1964 (aged 78); London, England
- Education: Royal Horticultural Training Institute
- Known for: Head Gardener at Lady Herbert's Garden

Else Emily Wilhelmine Hoffa (21 March 1885 – 8 January 1964) was a German gardener. She became the first woman in Germany to work as a head gardener and also worked in this capacity in England.

== Life and work ==
Else Hoffa began training as a gardener after her father's death in 1908, despite his expressed wishes during his lifetime. From October 1912 to March 1913, she interned at the Royal Horticultural Training Institute in Dahlem, where she learned the practical foundations of horticulture and embraced ideas later pursued by Karl Foerster regarding the use of hardy perennials in garden design.

In 1911, Max Warburg acquired the Kösterberg estate in Hamburg-Blankenese. On the land inherited from his late father, he built a manor house and hired Else Hoffa as head gardener in April 1913. Hoffa, who was friends with Warburg's wife Alice, became the first woman in Germany to work as a head gardener, overseeing up to a total of 17 employees – gardeners and five female assistants. Her employment contract included a clause guaranteeing her a bonus of ten percent on top of her base salary, provided she kept any trouble away from the banker.

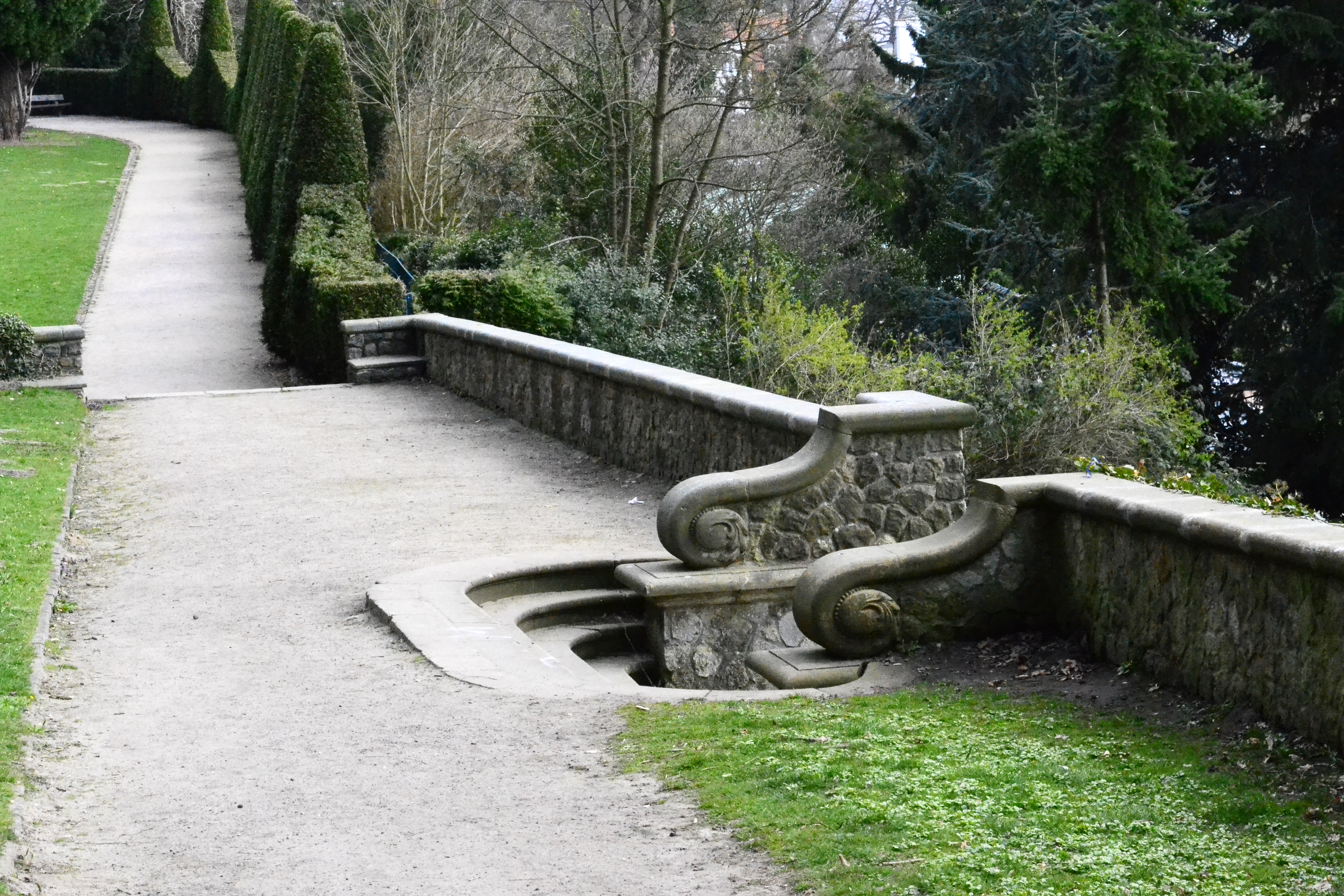
Steps in the Römischer Garten in Hamburg

During the Nazi Germany era, Hoffa was classified as "semi-Mosaic" and emigrated to England in 1938. There she worked as a gardener at Shipton Court in Oxfordshire and later for Lieutenant Colonel Acton-Brooke at Sibton Park in Kent. Hoffa also worked at the Royal Botanic Gardens in London and briefly as a florist at the Dorchester Hotel. In 1946, she became head gardener in Coventry city center, managing "Lady Herbert's Garden," commissioned by entrepreneur Alfred Herbert in memory of his late wife. Known for her modesty and creativity, Hoffa retired in 1956.

In 1957, Hoffa returned briefly to Hamburg to visit Eric M. Warburg at the family estate on Kösterberg and signed the guestbook with the note "Remembrance of a beautiful time."

The life of Else Hoffa (fictionalized as Hedda Herzog) serves as the backdrop for Marion Lagoda's 2023 novel Ein Garten über der Elbe as well as Katharina Hagena's 2025 novel Flusslinien.
