= Lady Herbert's Garden =

Garden in Coventry, West Midlands, England

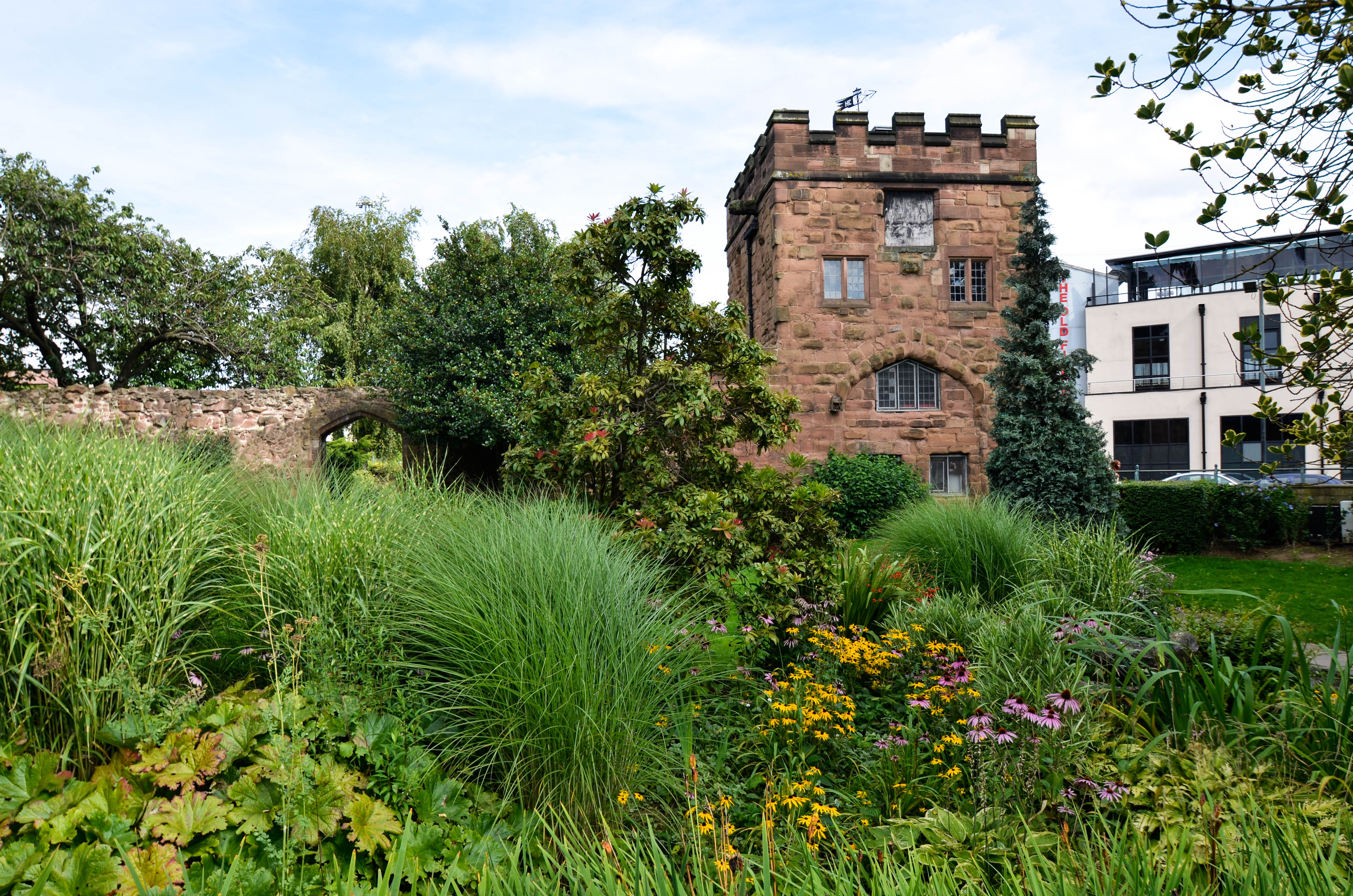
- Swanswell Gate stands at the edge of Lady Herbert's Garden.
- Interactive map of Lady Herbert's Garden
- Type: Ornamental
- Location: Coventry, England
- Coordinates: 52.41068°N 1.507471°W
- Opened: 12 April 1931
- Owner: Coventry City Council

Lady Herbert's Garden is a garden in Coventry city centre, named as a memorial to Alfred Herbert's second wife Florence. Construction and initial laying out began in 1930 and the last section was completed in 1939. It is built around several sections of the remains of Coventry city walls, including Swanswell and Cook Street Gates, and bordered by Chantry Place. The site was the former Chantry Orchard. Between 1816 and 1930, the area had become a slum, before being cleared to create the gardens.

== History ==
The gardens were designed by Albert Herbert, cousin of the industrialist and commissioner of them Alfred Herbert. The east garden was opened to the public on 12 April 1931 and a west garden was added from 1935 to 1938. From 1930 to 1947 the gardens were overseen by Miss Denision, who was succeeded by Miss Hoffa who left in 1956. Following Herbert's death in 1957 the trustees faced financial difficulties and in 1974, ownership was transferred to Coventry City Council.

== Lady Herbert's homes ==
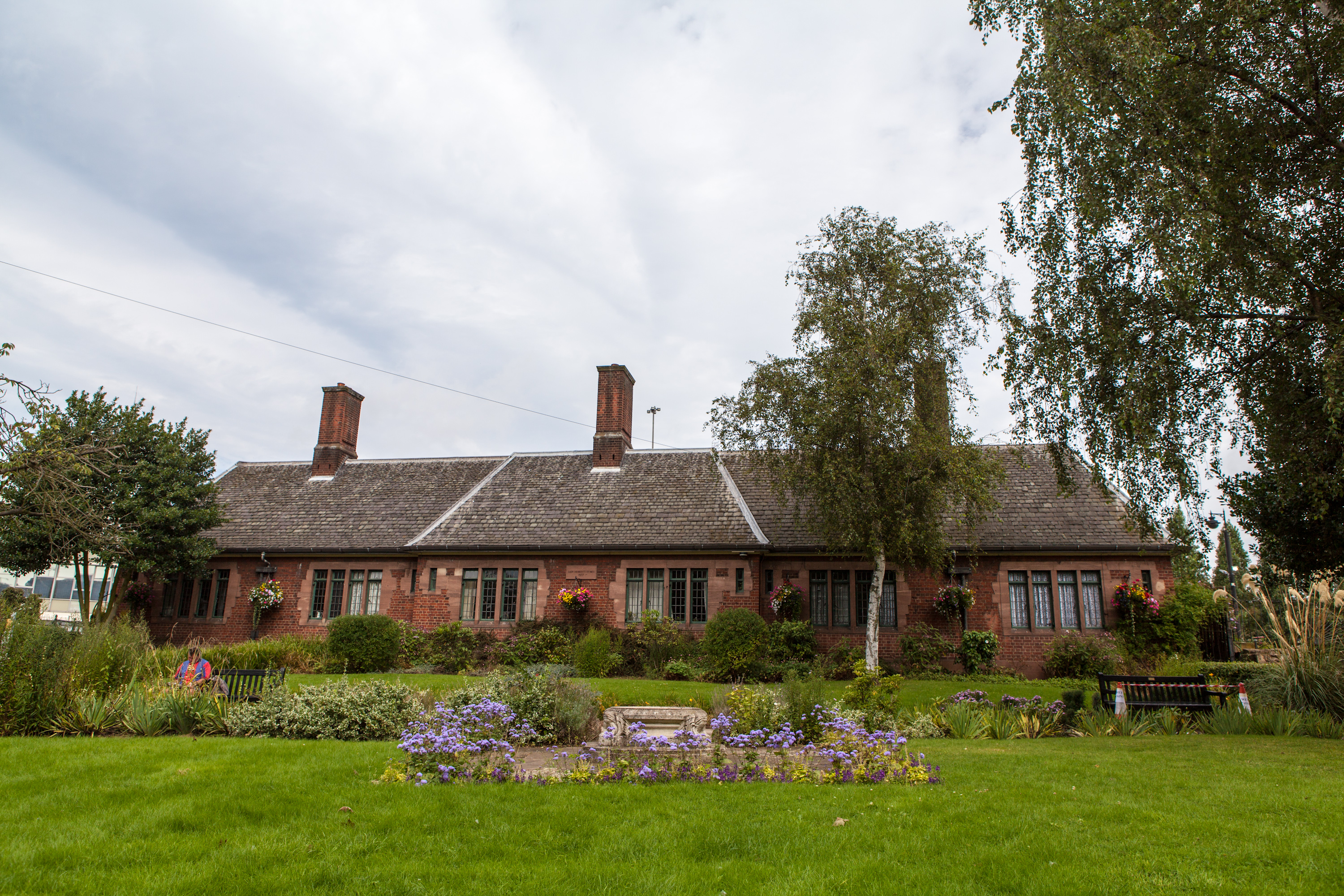
Lady Herbert's homes

Commonly known as Lady Herbert's homes, these two blocks of almshouses were built in 1935 and 1937. They were both damaged during the Coventry Blitz and were rebuilt. The homes are currently managed by a charitable trust.
