= Wolfgang J. R. Hoefer =

German-Canadian microwave engineer and researcher

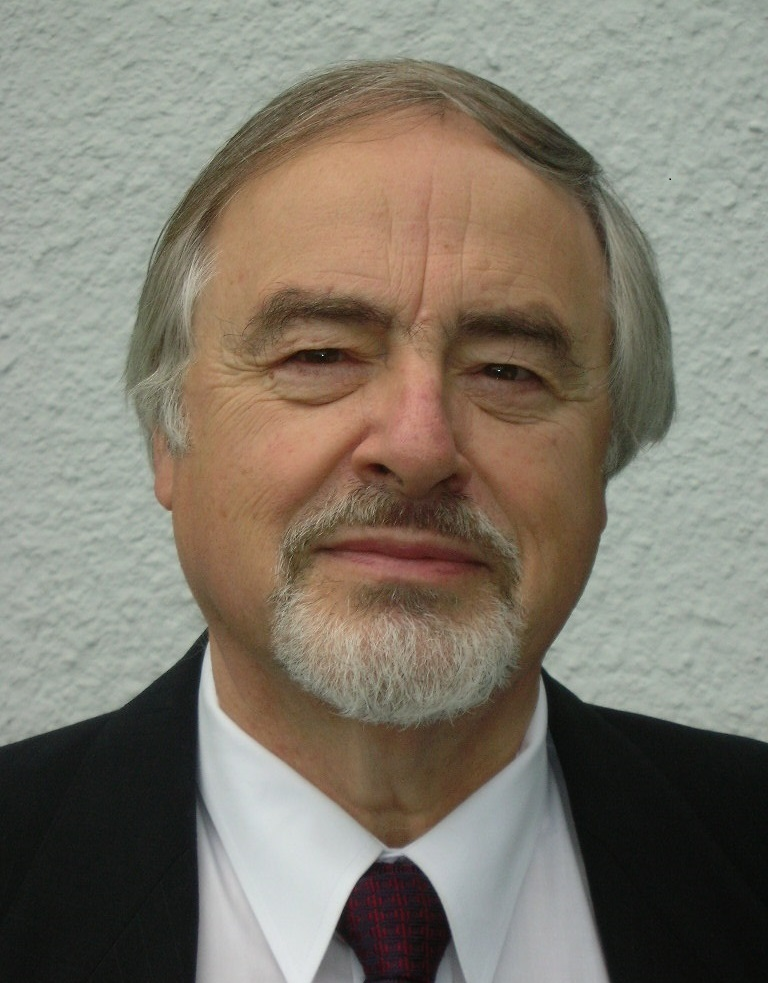
- Born: 1941; Urmitz, Rhineland-Palatinate, Germany
- Education: RWTH Aachen University (Dipl.-Ing., 1965); University of Grenoble (Docteur-Ingénieur, 1968)
- Known for: Time-domain electromagnetic modeling (TLM, FDTD); Planar microwave circuit design
- Awards: Life Fellow, IEEE (2007); Fellow, Royal Society of Canada (2003); Doctor of Engineering honoris causa, Technical University of Munich (2007); McNaughton Award and Gold Medal, IEEE Canada (2009); Microwave Pioneer Award, IEEE MTT Society (2011); Microwave Career Award, IEEE MTT Society (2022)
- Scientific career
- Fields: Electrical engineering, Microwave engineering, Computational electromagnetics
- Workplaces: University of Ottawa; University of Victoria; A*STAR Institute of High Performance Computing, Singapore
- Website: https://wolfganghoefer.com

Wolfgang Johannes Reinhard Hoefer (born 1941) is a German-born Canadian research scientist and professor of electrical and computer engineering. He is known for his contributions to microwave engineering, electromagnetic field theory, and computational electromagnetics. He advanced numerical methods such as the transmission-line matrix (TLM) and finite-difference time-domain (FDTD) techniques and translated them into computational design tools for microwave circuits used in communications, imaging, and industrial applications.

== Early life and education ==
Hoefer was born in Urmitz, Germany, and completed his secondary education in Koblenz in 1959. He earned his Dipl.-Ing. degree in electrical engineering from RWTH Aachen University in 1965 and his Docteur-Ingénieur (Doctor of Engineering, Ph.D. equivalent) from the University of Grenoble in 1968.

== Academic career ==
Hoefer was a postdoctoral fellow and sessional lecturer at the Institut Universitaire de Technologie (IUT) of the University of Grenoble, from 1968 to 1969. He joined the University of Ottawa, Canada in 1969 as an assistant professor and established the university’s first microwave research program and laboratory. He became a full professor in 1980 and served as chairman of the Department of Electrical Engineering from 1978 to 1981. He initially focused on planar microwave circuit modeling, later expanding into time-domain methods for electromagnetic field simulation such as TLM and FDTD.

From 1992 to 2006, he was a full professor of electrical and computer engineering at the University of Victoria (UVic) and held the endowed NSERC Industrial Research Chair in RF-Engineering until 2004. He founded the Computational Electromagnetics Research Laboratory (CERL) which he led until 2006. He continued developing time-domain modeling techniques for high-frequency circuits and components and supervised numerous graduate students who went on to academic and industrial careers. He was appointed professor emeritus in 2006.

From 2009 to 2012, Hoefer was Principal Scientist and Director of the Independent Investigatorship (I3) Department at the A*STAR Institute of High Performance Computing (IHPC) in Singapore, where he led a team developing computational models of metamaterials for super-resolution imaging and electromagnetic cloaking.

Beyond his full-time positions in Canada and Singapore, Hoefer held visiting appointments at institutions including the Grenoble Alpes University, the University of Rome Tor Vergata, Université Nice-Sophia-Antipolis, the University of Perugia, the Technical University of Munich, the University of Duisburg-Essen, ETH Zurich, and the Georgia Tech, as well as research centers such as AEG-Telefunken, the CRC Ottawa, and the Ferdinand-Braun-Institut.

== Honors and awards ==
Hoefer is a Life Fellow of the Institute of Electrical and Electronics Engineers, and a Fellow of the Royal Society of Canada, the German Academy of Science and Engineering, the Canadian Academy of Engineering, the Engineering Institute of Canada, and the Applied Computational Electromagnetics Society. He received the Doctor of Engineering honoris causa degree from the Technical University of Munich (TUM), Germany, in 2007 "in recognition of extraordinary achievements in the theory of electromagnetic fields".

=== Awards ===
- Distinguished Educator Award, IEEE Microwave Theory and Techniques (MTT) Society (2006)
- A.G.L. McNaughton Award and Gold Medal, IEEE Canada (Region 7), (2009)
- Microwave Pioneer Award, IEEE Microwave Theory and Techniques (MTT) Society (2011)
- Most Inspiring Mentor Award, Agency for Science, Technology and Research (A*STAR), Singapore (2012)
- Microwave Career Award, IEEE Microwave Theory and Techniques (MTT) Society (2022)

== Publications ==
Hoefer is the author or co-author of over 430 refereed papers in journals and conference proceedings, 14 book chapters and 2 books.

=== Books ===
- Hoefer, W. J. R.; So, P. P. M. (1991). The Electromagnetic Wave Simulator: A Visual Electromagnetics Laboratory Based on the 2D TLM Method. John Wiley & Sons, Chichester, UK. ISBN 0-471-93075-X.
- Swanson, D. G. Jr.; Hoefer, W. J. R. (2003). Microwave Circuit Modeling Using Electromagnetic Field Simulation. Artech House Publishers, Norwood, MA, USA. ISBN 1-58053-308-6.

== Legacy ==
Hoefer’s research bridges theoretical electromagnetic field modeling and practical microwave circuit design. The TLM and hybrid methods developed in his laboratories are widely cited in electromagnetic simulation literature. The following books contain chapters contributed by his former students and colleagues.

- Russer, P.; Siart, U., eds. (2008). Time Domain Methods in Electrodynamics: A Tribute to Wolfgang J. R. Hoefer. Springer Proceedings in Physics 121, Berlin & Heidelberg, Germany. ISBN 978-3-540-68766-5.
- Ahmed, I.; Chen, Z. D., eds. (2015). Computational Electromagnetics: Retrospective and Outlook – In Honor of Wolfgang J. R. Hoefer. Springer Science+Business Media, Singapore. ISBN 978-981-287-094-0.
