= Symposium on Principles of Self-Organization =

The Symposium on Principles of Self-Organization was held at Allerton House on 8–9 June 1960. It was a key conference in the development of cybernetics and was in many ways a continuation of the Macy Conferences. it was organised by Heinz von Foerster through the Biological Computer Laboratory based at University of Illinois at Urbana-Champaign. It was sponsored by the Information Systems Branch of the U.S. Office of Naval Research.

== Participants ==
There were 38 male participants:

=== Department of Electrical Engineering at the University of Illinois ===
This was the host organisation.

- Murray Babcock
- Heinz von Foerster
- Alfred Inselberg
- Lars Löfgren
- Albert Mullin
- Albert Novikoff
- Paul Weston
- George Zopf

=== Other participants from Illinois ===
- John Bowman, Technological Institute, Northwestern University
- Scott Cameron, Armour Research Foundation
- Peter Greene, Committee on Mathematical Biology, University of Chicago
- Friedrich Hayek, Committee on Social Thought, University of Chicago
- George Jacobi, Armour Research Foundation
- John R. Platt, Department of Physics, University of Chicago
- Stephen Sherwood, Illinois State Psychiatric Institute, Chicago
- A Shimbel, Illinois State Psychiatric Institute, Chicago

=== Cambridge Massachusetts ===
- Manuel Blum, W. S. McCulloch Room, Massachusetts Institute of Technology (MIT)
- Jack Cowan, W. S. McCulloch Room, MIT
- Jerome I. Elkind, Bolt, Beranek, Newman Inc.
- Warren McCulloch, W. S. McCulloch Room, MIT
- Leo Verbeek, W. S. McCulloch Room, MIT

=== Other participants ===
- Saul Amarel, Radio Corporation of America
- Ross Ashby,
- Stafford Beer, United Steel Companies
- Ludwig von Bertalanffy
- Raymond Beurle, English Electric Valve Company
- Hewitt Crane, Stanford Research Institute, Menlo Park, California
- Joseph Hawkins
- Hans Oestriecher
- Gordon Pask
- Anatol Rapaport
- Charles Rosen
- Frank Rosenblatt
- Jack E. Steele
- Roger Sperry
- John Tooley
- David Willis
- Marshal Yovits

Two women participated, Kathy Forbes providing secretarial services and Cornelia Schaeffer of Athenium Publishers providing assistance in preparing the subsequent publication of the transactions of the symposium.
