= Alfred Herbert (painter) =

English painter

Alfred Herbert (1818–1861), was an English watercolour painter.

Herbert was born in Christchurch area of Southwark the son of a Thames waterman, who apprenticed him to a boatbuilder, but, yielding to a strong natural inclination, he became an artist. He began to exhibit with the Society of British Artists in 1844, and at the Royal Academy in 1847, his subjects being coast scenes, with fishing-boats and figures, and views in the lower reaches of the Thames. He sent an oil picture to Suffolk Street in 1855, and continued a regular contributor of water-colours at the Royal Academy until 1860. Though he was entirely self-taught, his works displayed remarkable vigour and genius, but they failed to meet with general appreciation, and he could only dispose of them to the dealers at extremely low prices. He died suddenly at the beginning of 1861, leaving a widow and seven children in distressed circumstances. The South Kensington Museum possesses two examples of his art.
