= Peter James Hoffer =

Canadian artist (born 1965)

Peter Hoffer (born 1965) is a Canadian artist known for his painterly landscapes. Hoffer's deconstructivist approach – characterized by layers of paint and fragmented, reflective surfaces – challenges artistic conventions of representation. Solo exhibitions of his work have been held at the Musée national des beaux-arts du Québec (Quebec City) and galleries in Montreal, Toronto, Ottawa, London, Paris, Berlin, Boston and New York.

== Life and career ==
Peter Hoffer was born in Brantford, Ontario in 1965. He studied painting and sculpture at the Ontario College of Art and Design in Toronto in 1990 and at the University of Guelph where he completed a Bachelor of Fine Arts in 1993. After a sojourn in New York City, he studied sculpture at Concordia University in Montreal and in 1996 graduated with a Masters in Fine Art. His installation on urban architecture and organic decomposition, Retro Architectural Models, was exhibited in Montreal in 1998. Solo exhibitions of his work were also held at the Leonard and Bina Ellen Gallery (Montreal), Centre De Créativité Des Salles Du Gesù (Montreal), and Rotunda Gallery, Kitchener City Hall. Following a trip to Paris, Hoffer began to experiment with surface textures within landscape. Interested in the physicality of paint he began to "sand, grind, and scour the layers of painted surface". Intrigued by the French Salon practice of revarnishing unsold works, he finished his work with layers of damar varnish and an epoxy and resin finish to create a reflective, dome surface. In recent years Hoffer began to experiment with abstract watercolours and deconstructivism within urban poster imagery. These compositions were exhibited as Städtisch Wald at Kurfürstenstrasse Atelier (Berlin) in 2016.

Hoffer lives and works in Berlin and in Quebec during the summer months.

== Work and Style ==
"Distinguished by mood and sweep of the motif", Hoffer's landscapes are described in The New York Sun as "luminous skies set off by the outline of trees, the dramas of light and shade." Ottawa Citizen reviewer, Peter Simpson, noted: "They have a grey hardiness that projects a grand, vast, transcendent solitude," while a lone hardwood conveys "a vulnerability even in these rocks and rugged greenery". Montreal Gazette art reviewer Lynn Moore noted that the narrative produced by Hoffer's "less than spectacular" subjects – "What caused that break in the tree line on the horizon?" – "encourages the viewer to investigate the anomaly and look for meaning." His style and technique have been compared to the atmospheric mist and clouds of Pierre-Henri de Valenciennes and to the idealized landscapes of John Constable. Hoffer's colour "surface patterning" also recalls the Romantic artists' experimentation with paint splashes, while his stressed surfaces have been compared to the American painter Albert Pinkham Ryder. His painterly drips and blocks of colour have also linked to Abstract Expressionism of Jackson Pollock and the Colorfield style of Mark Rothko.

== Recognition ==
Hoffer's work is reviewed in the international art journals Vie des Arts (Montreal), American Arts Quarterly (Boston), and Art Es (Madrid). His landscapes are noted for both artistry, "pitch-perfect tonal sense that evokes real places", as well as message: "There is a sense of painterly surface and medium as well as of literary depth and meaning." Montreal Gazette reviewer Lynn Moore wrote: "While we admire the beauty of the work, we are aware of a modern artist asking us to consider process and the act of creation itself." For reviewer Ève Dorais: Hoffer's technique – layered paint, exposed surfaces and reflective finish – affirms that art "is a construction, a staging, a game of the mind," with viewers as "actors" mirrored within an idyllic landscape. A protective packaging for the precious objet d'art, the gloss finish also serves as a "threshold to another state of mind": "The curious have to step closer, change their perspective and look longer to get past reflections to see the details under the surface glimmer." For Moore, Hoffer's landscapes are: "Personal yet universal. Accessible yet demanding of some analysis." Peter Simpson writing in the Ottawa Citizen concluded: "They are profound works, from an artist with a clear vision."

Hoffer's work is exhibited at such international art fairs as Art Basel, Art Toronto, Art New York, Art Palm Beach, and the Affordable Art Fairs in New York, Stockholm, London, Milan, Brussels, Amsterdam, and Hong Kong. His paintings are found in the Musée national des beaux-arts du Québec (Quebec QC) and the German Consulate (Toronto).
