= Paul Hofer (disambiguation) =

Paul Hofer (born 1952) is an American football player.

Paul Hofer may also refer to:

- Paul Hofer (footballer) (1881–?), Swiss footballer
- Paul Hofer (ice hockey) (1928–2016), Swiss ice hockey player

== See also ==
- Paul Höffer (1895–1949), German composer
