= Alfred Herbert (company) =

Defunct British machine tool builder

Alfred Herbert Ltd
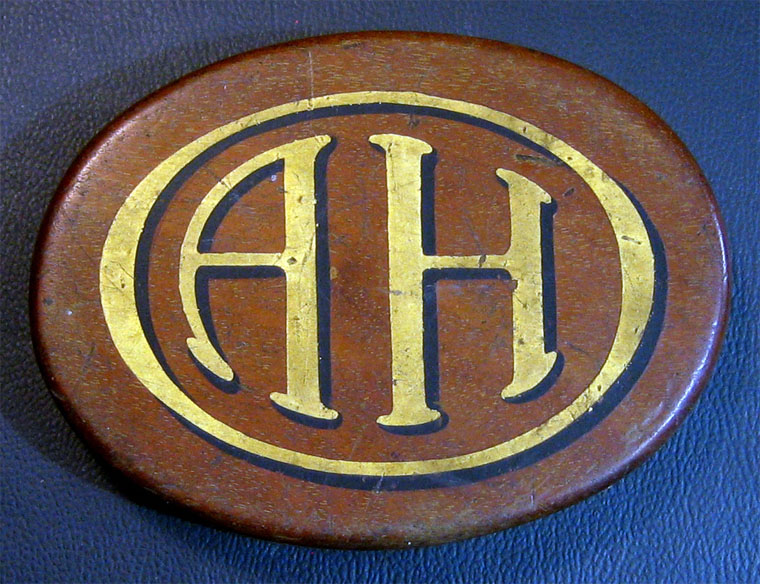
- Type: Public company
- Industry: Machine tools
- Founded: 1888
- Defunct: 1983
- Fate: Acquired
- Successor: TI Group
- Headquarters: Coventry, UK,
- Key people: Alfred Herbert (Chairman)

Alfred Herbert Ltd was one of the world's largest machine tool manufacturing businesses. It was at one time the largest British machine tool builder.

== History ==
The business was founded in 1888 when Alfred Herbert and William Hubbard purchased for £2,375 a small engineering business in Coventry. Herbert & Hubbard initially made boilers and steam engines. The firm, in Roderick Floud's paraphrasing of Herbert, "came into machine tool production by accident when Alfred Herbert secured the agency for a French patent of great value in the manufacture of tubes for the fast expanding cycle trade in Coventry. On the basis of his profits from this patent the company began to make machine tools for the cycle trade."

In 1894 Hubbard was bought out and the business continued as Alfred Herbert Ltd focusing on machine tools. The number of employees rose from 180 in 1897 to 1,400 by 1908.

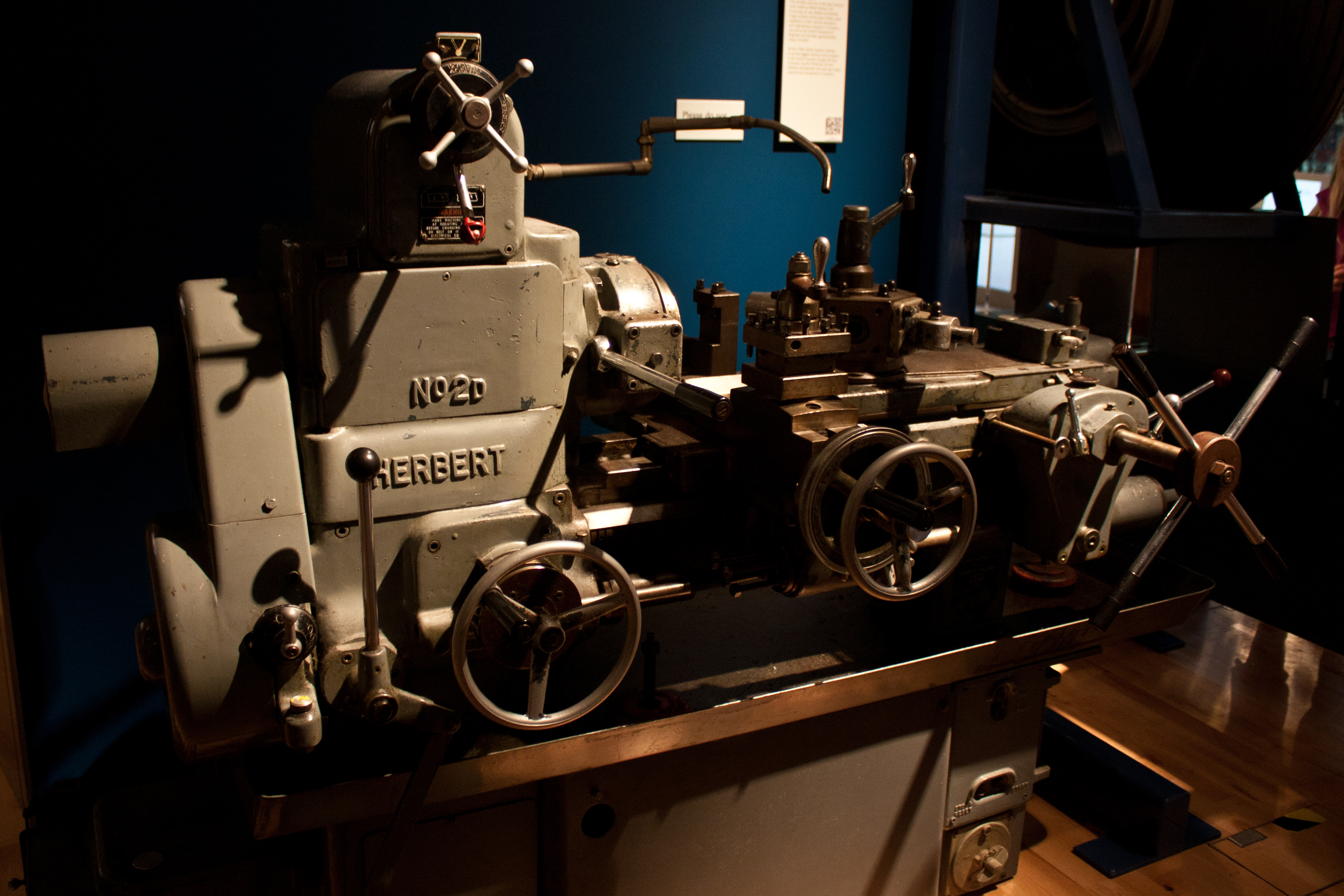
A Herbert Lathe on display in Herbert Art Gallery and Museum.

Regarding the differences (real or supposed) between American and British practice in the latter half of the 19th century, Floud said that Herbert was "the [British] firm often held up as an example of the use of American techniques" [which sometimes emphasised focus on a narrow range of machines by any one builder] but that even Herbert "rejected the idea that the firm should specialize in a few types of machinery" [to the exclusion of a diverse mix of products]. He quoted Herbert as saying that "the cycle business, which was our principal customer, required in those days a variety of machines, and not many of them of one kind."

The firm was known for technical excellence and competed well against other brands, especially in turret lathes. The foreign-sales efforts of the Herbert firm are touched on in Floud's discussion of machine tool exports.

In 1899 a foundry was built at Edgwick where most of the Company's operations were subsequently based. During the first half of the twentieth century it became one of the largest machine tool manufacturers in the world.

By the 1930s Alfred Herbert Limited was making profits around £600,000 (2011: £22,400,000) . The company was listed on the London Stock Exchange in March 1944 and the following year described its business as "Machine Tool Makers, Importers and Factors, and Mechanical Engineers etc". The main works covered 22 acres in Coventry and the company had operations in Argentina, France, India, Australia and "in normal times", Italy. It acquired Sigma Instruments in 1948.

In 1975, following sustained losses, the company asked the National Enterprise Board to invest £25 million in the business to provide for modernisation and to reduce borrowings. The Company was then renamed Herbert Ltd. In the late 1970s there was an escalation of machine tool imports into the United Kingdom that left the Company behind.

The business was acquired by Tooling Investments in 1980 but then went into receivership in 1982. The assets were bought by Tube Investments later that year, but the business closed in 1983.

== See also ==
- Herbert Art Gallery and Museum
