= Franz Hofer (disambiguation) =

Franz Hofer (1902–1975) was an Austrian politician.

Franz Hofer may also refer to:

- Franz Hofer (director) (1882–1945), German movie director
- Franz Hofer (footballer) (1918–1990), Austrian footballer
