= Ernst Hofer =

Ernst Hofer may refer to:

- Ernst Hofer (cyclist) (1902–1944), Swiss cyclist
- Ernst Hofer (judoka) (1971–2023), Austrian judoka
