= Adolf Hofer =

Adolf Hofer or Höfer may refer to:

- Adolf Hofer (luger), Austrian luger
- Adolf Hofer (politician) (1868–1935), Prussian Junker and Social Democratic politician
- Adolf Höfer (painter) (1869–1927), German landscape and portrait painter
