= Raymond Beurle =

English electrical engineer (1921–2013)

Raymond Louis Beurle (1921 – 21 June 2013, Nottingham) was an English electrical engineer. In 1963 he became the first professor of electrical engineering at University of Nottingham.

He gained an honours degree in engineering before engaging in experimental work for the Royal Navy during the Second World War. He then went on to work on the application of new techniques to aid blind people, completing his PhD thesis "Electronic Aids for Blind People". He then started working for the Royal Radar Establishment in Malvern before moving onto Imperial College, London in 1955. In 1957 he moved on to English Electric Valve Company (EEV), where he was manager of the Camera Tube and Image Tube Research Department.

While he was living in Great Baddow, he had a patent registered for an image production invention which he assigned to EEV.

He participated in the Symposium on Principles of Self-Organization organised by Heinz von Foerster in 1960, delivering a paper on "Functional Organization in Random Networks".
