= Ulrich Höfer =

German professor of physics

Ulrich Höfer (born 7 July 1957, in Zusmarshausen) is a German professor of physics at the University of Marburg. He received his Ph.D. in 1989. According to Google Scholar, Höfer has an h-index of 44/50 (Scopus/Goggle Scholar, As of 2022). His main research area is Surface Dynamics.

== Research areas ==
- Ultrafast dynamics of electronic excitations
- Adsorption on semiconductor surfaces
- Time-resolved two-photon photoemission
- Laser spectroscopy of surfaces and interfaces

== Awards and recognition ==
- Arnold Sommerfeld Prize of the Bavarian Academy of Sciences and Humanities (1995)
- Fellow der American Physical Society (2006)
- Fellow der Japan Society for the Promotion of Science (2015)

== Publications ==
- Höfer, Ulrich; Echenique, Pedro M. (2016). "Resolubility of image-potential resonances". Surface Science. 643. Elsevier BV: 203–209. arXiv:1507.03812. Bibcode:2016SurSc.643..203H. doi:10.1016/j.susc.2015.07.019. ISSN 0039-6028. S2CID 43764969.
- Nichtlineare optische Spektroskopie an Siliziumoberflächen, Habilitationsschrift, Physics Department, Technische Universität München (1996).
- Coulman, D.; Puschmann, A.; Höfer, U.; Steinrück, H.-P.; Wurth, W.; Feulner, P.; Menzel, D. (1990). "Excitation, deexcitation, and fragmentation in the core region of condensed and adsorbed water". The Journal of Chemical Physics. 93 (1). AIP Publishing: 58–75. Bibcode:1990JChPh..93...58C. doi:10.1063/1.459560. ISSN 0021-9606.
