= Andreas Hofer (disambiguation) =

Andreas Hofer (1767–1810) was a Tyrolean innkeeper and patriot.

Andreas Hofer may also refer to:

== People ==
- Andreas Hofer (composer) (1629–1684), German composer
- Andreas Hofer (actor) (born 1962), German actor
- Andreas Hofer (cyclist) (born 1991), Austrian cyclist
- Andy Hope 1930 (born 1963), German painter

== Other ==
- Andreas Hofer (film), a 1929 German silent historical film
