= Alfred Herbert =

English industrialist and museum benefactor (1866–1957)

Sir Alfred Herbert KBE
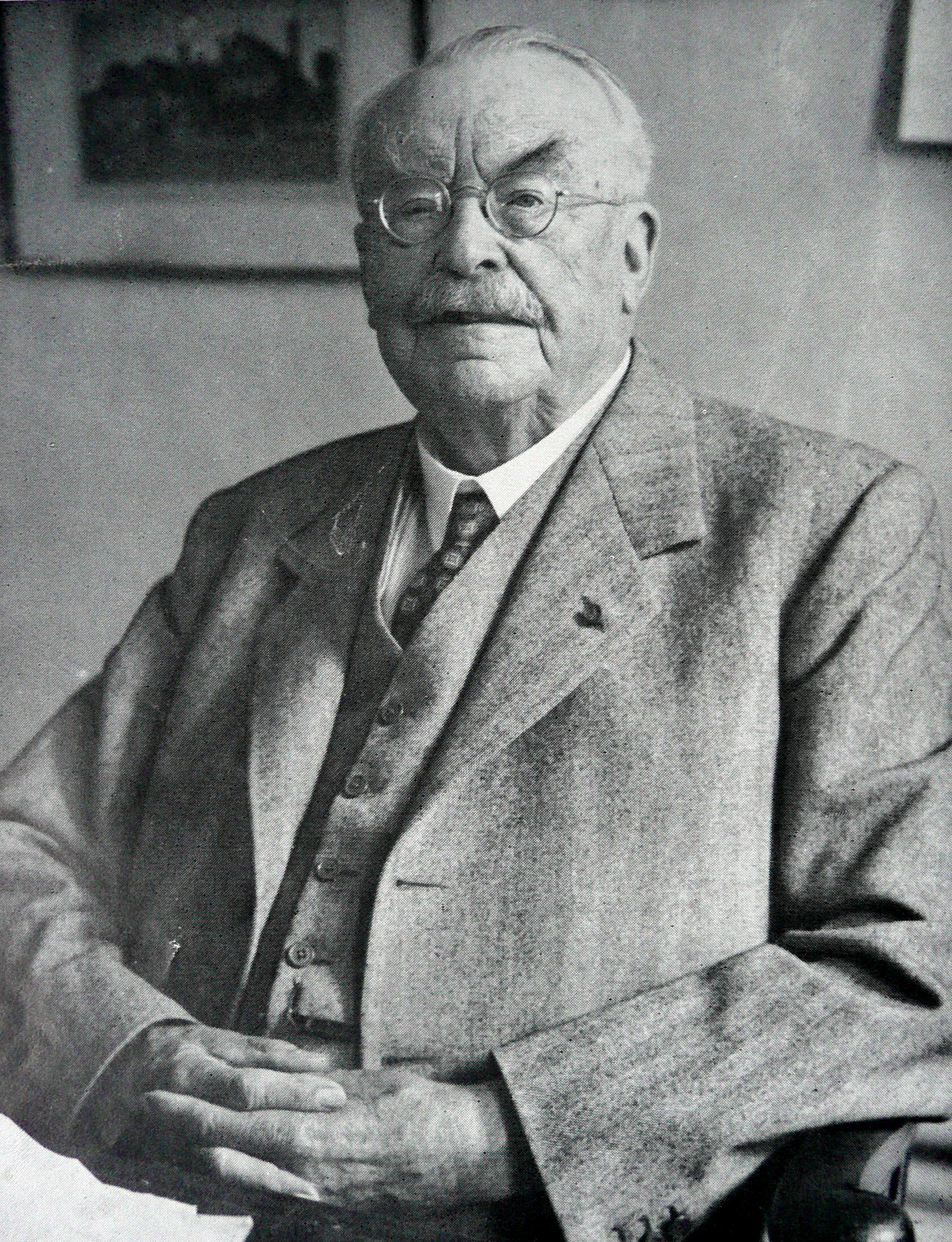
- Alfred Herbert at the age of 90
- Born: 5 September 1866; Leicester, England
- Died: 26 May 1957 (aged 90); King's Somborne, England
- Organization: Alfred Herbert Ltd.
- Known for: Benefactor to Herbert Art Gallery and Museum
- Spouse(s): Ellen Adela (married 1889), Florence Lucus (married 1913), Marian Pugh (married 1933)
- Children: 4

Sir Alfred Edward Herbert KBE (5 September 1866 – 26 May 1957) was an English industrialist and museum benefactor. He moved to Coventry in 1887 to manage a small engineering business which grew to become Alfred Herbert Limited, one of the world's largest manufacturers and distributors of machine tools.

== Career ==
Born in Leicester and educated at Stoneygate House School in Leicester, Alfred Herbert became an apprentice at Joseph Jessop & Sons, crane builders in 1884.

In 1887 he moved to Coventry to become manager of Coles & Matthews, a small engineering business in the Butts where his brother, William, was director. In 1888 he went into partnership with William Hubbard. They bought C&M for £2,375 and traded as Herbert & Hubbard. Herbert bought out Hubbard in 1894 and the company was incorporated under the name Alfred Herbert Limited: a company that would become one of the World's largest manufacturers and distributors of machine tools. During World War I Herbert became Controller of machine tools for the Ministry of Munitions. He was knighted in 1917 and appointed an Officer in the Belgian Order of Leopold and an Officer in the French Légion d'honneur in 1919.

He retired to Dunley Manor in Whitchurch, Hampshire and died at King's Somborne in 1957.

== Philanthropy ==
As well as being an industrialist, Herbert was a philanthropist within Coventry, building almshouses, supporting wounded servicemen through donations, establishing a camp for the city's poor children, and funding the rebuilding of Coventry Cathedral. He was granted the Freedom of the City of Coventry as an Honorary Freemen on 15 June 1933 in recognition of his philanthropy and contributions to the industrial development of the city. After the Coventry Blitz he donated £20,000 for reconstruction work at the Coventry and Warwickshire Hospital, in 1940.

Herbert's legacy also lives on in the Herbert Art Gallery and Museum, of which he was a major benefactor. In 1938 he donated £100,000 to Coventry City Council to erect a Gallery and Museum on a town centre site owned by the council. The city's destruction during the Second World War meant that construction was suspended. New plans were drawn up in 1952, and in May 1954 the foundation stone was laid by Herbert, who also donated a further £100,000 to the project. Lady Herbert's Garden off Hales Street is named in honour of his second wife.

== Family ==
He was married three times; he married Ellen Adela Ryley (1864 -1918) on 17 September 1889, with whom he had four daughters, Gladys (1890–1962), Beatrice (1892 -1969), Doris (1894–1969) and Phyllis (1896–1972). They separated and then divorced in 1913.

He married Florence Lucas (née Pepper) in 1913, widow of Lieutenant-Colonel H. E. E. Lucas. She was a matron at the Coventry and Warwickshire Hospital where Alfred was chairman of the board. She died in 1930 and he paid for decoration of the lady chapel of St Barbara's Church in her memory and Lady Herbert's Garden, where her initials feature on all the original railings, bronze gates, and the weathervane on top of Swanswell Gate.

In 1933, he married Marian Pugh, (née Arundel) (1881–1969), widow of Lieutenant-Colonel Pugh.
